= Hi-5 series 13 =

Hi-5
- Series 13
- Starring: Lauren Brant; Casey Burgess; Fely Irvine; Tim Maddren; Stevie Nicholson
- No. of episodes: 45

Release
- Original network: Nine Network
- Original release: 17 October – 16 December 2011

Series chronology
- ← Previous; Series 12 Next → Hi-5 House Series 1

The thirteenth series of the children's television series Hi-5 aired between 17 October 2011 and 16 December 2011 on the Nine Network in Australia. The series was produced by Southern Star and Nine with Noel Price as executive producer.

This was the last series to feature Casey Burgess, Fely Irvine, and Tim Maddren. Lauren Brant and Stevie Nicholson continued as cast members in the spin-off series Hi-5 House.

== Production ==
Following the Nine Network and Southern Star's acquisition of the Hi-5 franchise in 2008, a deal was made to produce five new series of the program featuring the "new generation" cast. Southern Star produced two of these series in 2009 and 2010, and begun production of the third in 2011. Noel Price returned as the executive producer for his third series, and all five cast members; Lauren Brant, Casey Burgess, Fely Irvine, Tim Maddren, and Stevie Nicholson, returned.

The thirteenth series premiered on 17 October 2011. The new set of episodes celebrated the program's musical history by reintroducing previous songs of the week to a new generation of fans. The classic songs were reinterpreted for the series, with new costumes and dance routines. Network directors Martin Hersov and Cathy Payne stated, "We know these will continue as hits with our new generation of fans.”

Irvine departed the cast in late 2011, soon after the series aired, with a network representative stating she was leaving to explore "other career options". This was the final series produced by the Nine Network and Southern Star, before Nine sold the Hi-5 franchise in 2012. The two remaining series originally ordered by Nine in 2009 were not produced.

== Cast ==
=== Presenters ===
- Lauren Brant – Body Move
- Casey Burgess – Word Play
- Fely Irvine – Puzzles and Patterns
- Tim Maddren – Making Music
- Stevie Nicholson – Shapes in Space

== Episodes ==
No. overall	No. in series	Title	Song of the Week	Theme	Original release date
526	1	"Wonders of the World"	Wow! (Note: Labelled as "Amazing")	Amazing	17 October 2011
Stevie dresses up as the Sydney Harbour Bridge for a parade featuring the Wonders of the World. Lauren tries to lean like the Leaning Tower of Pisa. Fely uses cooking ingredients to create bubbling lava for a miniature volcano. Lauren pretends to be an explosion of lava from a volcano. Tim the howler monkey holds auditions to see which animals will join the amazing Amazon rainforest choir. Casey pretends to be the engineer of an Egyptian pyramid while Chats, the pharaoh queen, fills it with precious possessions. Lauren stretches with a sphinx pose and a cobra snake pose. Sharing Stories: Tim tells a story about four bugs (Fely the beetle, Lauren the ant, Casey the snail, and Stevie the spider) who decide to set off and see the world, travelling together across the backyard.
527	2	"Amazing Space"	Wow!	Amazing	18 October 2011
Stevie builds an observatory to look at the stars in outer space through telescopes. Lauren performs a dance for the moon and the stars while Tim plays the guitar. Casey builds Chats a spaceship to help her travel on an imaginary adventure to Saturn, like an astronaut. Lauren pretends to be Saturn, spinning around in space with hula hoop rings. Tim meets two aliens (Casey and Stevie) who land on Earth and communicates with them through outer space music. Fely pretends to be an astronaut landing on the moon. Lauren makes a little spaceship and launches it into outer space. Sharing Stories: Fely tells a story about a superhero called Eco Boy (Stevie), who journeys into space to save the world and his family (Tim, Casey, and Lauren) from a blob of sludge blocking the sun.
528	3	"Magic"	Wow!	Amazing	19 October 2011
Stevie performs a magical disappearing trick. Lauren makes animal shadows using her hands. Fely stages a series of magic tricks using balloons. Lauren pretends to be a magician putting on a magic show. Tim uses a penny whistle and a pungi to imagine travelling to India and Ireland. Casey dresses up as a magician and tries to recall the magic word needed to make a rabbit appear from a hat. Lauren dresses up as a gorilla for a showstopping dancing act. Sharing Stories: Tim tells a story about four bugs (Fely the beetle, Lauren the ant, Casey the snail, and Stevie the spider) who decide to set off and see the world, travelling together across the backyard.
529	4	"Heroes"	Wow!	Amazing	20 October 2011
Fely dresses up as a superhero, while Jup Jup helps her transform into a beetle. Lauren practises her superhero moves. When Casey wants to pretend she's flying a hang glider and Chats wants to go canoeing, the pair end up pretending together after Chats needs rescuing. Lauren pretends to be a rescue helicopter. Tim becomes Wonder Tim, a superhero who helps people solve musical problems. Stevie becomes a knight and helps a lonely dragon (Tim) feel fierce and confident. Lauren dresses up as a princess and calls for a drink to be served. Sharing Stories: Fely tells a story about a superhero called Eco Boy (Stevie), who journeys into space to save the world and his family (Tim, Casey, and Lauren) from a blob of sludge blocking the sun.
530	5	"Miniature World"	Wow!	Amazing	21 October 2011
Casey and Chats imagine being microscopic and meeting microbes inside a drop of water. Lauren searches for something important. Fely creates a display of bugs and insects in the garden. Lauren pretends to be a stink bug showering beneath a flower. Tim imagines meeting a spider on a web (Fely), while it weaves its web and sings. Stevie pretends to be a termite who tap dances while building a mound in the dirt. Lauren pretends to be a football-playing ant. Sharing Stories: Tim tells a story about four bugs (Fely the beetle, Lauren the ant, Casey the snail, and Stevie the spider) who decide to set off and see the world, travelling together across the backyard.
531	6	"Discovery Under the Sea"	Underwater Discovery	Water World	24 October 2011
Stevie goes on a deep-sea diving adventure at the bottom of the ocean and discovers a variety of fishes. Lauren pretends to be a dolphin diving in the deep sea. Casey and Chats imagine travelling underwater in a submarine. Lauren imagines what she might see looking through a submarine window. Tim imagines meeting sea creatures while writing a song about the sea, who help him find special sea sounds to include in the song. Fely goes on a pretend underwater journey in search of a rare, spotty, and stripy fish. Lauren pretends to be an octopus wearing eight socks on her arms. Sharing Stories: Casey tells a story about a squid (Lauren) living in the ocean, who journeys to the edge of the coral reef for a picnic lunch, while meeting some friends along the way (Tim, Stevie, and Fely).
532	7	"On the Water"	Underwater Discovery	Water World	25 October 2011
Casey imagines her new rocking chair is a boat on the ocean, sailing with the waves. Lauren pretends to be waves rolling onto the shore. Stevie pretends to be a tugboat with the job of guiding a large ship into the harbour. Lauren goes for an imaginary paddle boat ride, using her legs to row. Tim goes for a ride in a Chinese dragon boat, while beating a drum to keep the paddling in time. Fely uses a basket as a pretend boat for a sailing adventure and goes fishing for lunch. Lauren navigates a boat, hoisting the sail and catching the wind at sea. Sharing Stories: Lauren tells a story about a pirate called Captain Puffy Pants (Tim), whose pants cause a commotion when he competes against his nemesis Captain High Note (Fely) in a race, along with his crew (Stevie and Casey).
533	8	"At the Beach"	Underwater Discovery	Water World	26 October 2011
Fely becomes a fitness trainer and exercises at the beach while Jup Jup tries to sleep. Lauren plays some games at the beach. Stevie uses seashells and items collected at the beach to make a sea collage. Lauren plays on the sand and looks for shells before going for a swim. Tim meets three hermit crabs at the beach, who are holding a dance contest to compete for a new shell. Casey and Chats discover things starting with S while sitting on the sand, from sandcastles to starfish. Lauren puts on sunscreen before heading to the beach. Sharing Stories: Casey tells a story about a squid (Lauren) living in the ocean, who journeys to the edge of the coral reef for a picnic lunch, while meeting some friends along the way (Tim, Stevie, and Fely).
534	9	"Island Life"	Underwater Discovery	Water World	27 October 2011
Casey and Chats dress up as a pirate and a parrot and go hunting for hidden treasure using rhyming clues. Lauren digs for buried treasure by the seaside. Fely makes a Hawaiian lei using frangipani flowers. Lauren does a Hawaiian dance while wearing her flower lei. Tim and the Hi-5 family visit the beach and find tropical instruments to play on the sand. Stevie runs a tropical drink stand at the beach and makes some fruit shakes for Casey by shaking the bottles. Lauren has a relaxing holiday on a hammock. Sharing Stories: Lauren tells a story about a pirate called Captain Puffy Pants (Tim), whose pants cause a commotion when he competes against his nemesis Captain High Note (Fely) in a race, along with his crew (Stevie and Casey).
535	10	"Coral Reef"	Underwater Discovery	Water World	28 October 2011
Stevie pretends to be King Neptune, the ruler of an underwater kingdom. Lauren goes for a bouncy ride on a seahorse. Casey and Chats follow a jellyfish's instructions to search for sunken treasure in the deep sea. Lauren pretends to be a rock lobster. Tim searches for mermaids and plays a conch shell to call out to sea. Fely tries to find places for sea creatures to camouflage against in an underwater display. Lauren presents an undersea fish parade, pretending to be a clownfish, an angelfish, and a pufferfish. Sharing Stories: Casey tells a story about a squid (Lauren) living in the ocean, who journeys to the edge of the coral reef for a picnic lunch, while meeting some friends along the way (Tim, Stevie, and Fely).
536	11	"Love"	L.O.V.E.	Feel Good	31 October 2011
Casey and Chats use a stethoscope to listen to their heartbeats. Lauren listens to the rhythm of her heartbeat. Stevie dresses up as a cowboy to sing a country karaoke song. Lauren does a country-style cowgirl dance while twirling a ribbon lasso. Tim plays funky punk music in his space, but is not sure if the rest of Hi-5 will enjoy it too. Fely makes up a song and dance as a special way of saying "I love you" to her favourite people. Lauren gives hugs and kisses as a way of saying hello and goodbye. Sharing Stories: Fely tells a story about a family of puppies (Casey, Tim, and Lauren) who visit the backyard for the first time to learn tricks from their grandfather (Stevie).
537	12	"Doing"	L.O.V.E.	Feel Good	1 November 2011
Stevie combines two of his favourite things when he makes up a dance featuring shapes. Lauren does some disco dance moves. Casey tries to keep in time with her skipping by following along to Chats's skipping song. Lauren plays a game involving jumping, hopping, and skipping. Tim writes a song about sport and uses percussion instruments to replicate the sounds of the games. Fely bakes a heart-shaped cake to share with Casey and Chats. Lauren makes different animal shapes using her hands. Sharing Stories: Stevie tells a story about a swallow (Lauren) who decides to teach her babies (Tim and Casey) how to fly, including the youngest bird (Fely), who is worried about leaving the nest.
538	13	"Helping Others"	L.O.V.E.	Feel Good	2 November 2011
Stevie becomes a rescue worker and helps to clean up the community after a storm. Lauren looks after a friend's pet kitten. Casey tries to find a different way to deliver meals on wheels to those in need. Lauren discovers a creative way to carry a heavy load of items to her grandmother's house. Tim helps his sad double bass friend get his groove back by inviting some other instruments to play jazz music with them. Fely becomes an ambulance worker and takes her teddy bear with a sore throat to the hospital. Lauren the nurse looks after her patients. Sharing Stories: Fely tells a story about a family of puppies (Casey, Tim, and Lauren) who visit the backyard for the first time to learn tricks from their grandfather (Stevie).
539	14	"Achieving"	L.O.V.E.	Feel Good	3 November 2011
Stevie practises tying his shoelaces on an oversized shoe. Lauren encourages her feet to work together so that she can tap dance. Fely rehearses a taekwondo pattern at different speeds when Jup Jup alters the music. Lauren performs some slow tai chi stretches. Tim imagines driving a racing car to help him sing a very fast song. Casey helps Chats read a book by herself for the first time by acting out the story. Lauren practises skipping. Sharing Stories: Stevie tells a story about a swallow (Lauren) who decides to teach her babies (Tim and Casey) how to fly, including the youngest bird (Fely), who is worried about leaving the nest.
540	15	"Favourite Things"	L.O.V.E.	Feel Good	4 November 2011
Fely uses long and narrow pieces of colourful old clothes to arrange a rainbow pattern. Lauren matches colours with her feelings. Casey imagines creating some healthy new energy snacks for her favourite karate star, Katie Cool Pants. Lauren pretends to be a strong sumo wrestler from Japan. Tim gives Fely a guitar lesson when he notices she has borrowed one of his favourite guitars to practise with. Stevie the bowerbird searches for blue items to decorate his bower with for a birdhouse party. Lauren wonders why the sky and sea are blue. Sharing Stories: Fely tells a story about a family of puppies (Casey, Tim, and Lauren) who visit the backyard for the first time to learn tricks from their grandfather (Stevie).
541	16	"Robots"	Robot Number One	Machines	7 November 2011
Casey pretends to be a robot who follows Chats's instructions in order to make a sandwich. Lauren pretends to be a piece of bread in a toaster. Fely explores the power that operates her toy helicopter's propeller. Lauren pretends to be a wind-up robot bird toy. Tim tests out his remote-controlled robots, who complete chores around the house in his place. Stevie tries to teach his robot dog to walk and move at different speeds. Lauren teaches her robot dog to walk in different directions. Sharing Stories: Lauren tells a story about three robots (Tim, Fely, and Stevie) from a toy factory, who decide to visit the beach and set up an ice cream stand, where they use their factory experience to build an ice cream boat for a customer (Casey).
542	17	"Inventions"	Robot Number One	Machines	8 November 2011
Casey tests out Chats's happiness machine and tries not to laugh at her silly instructions. Lauren performs a song with each of her finger faces representing a different feeling. Fely invents a clock which helps her keep track of the tasks she has to do during the day. Lauren pretends to be an alarm clock, using her arms as the clock hands. Tim pretends to be a scientist and invents a robot that can play music at different speeds: andante, moderato, and allegro. Stevie invents a flying machine that can travel in the air and float on the ocean. Lauren makes paper aeroplanes. Sharing Stories: Casey tells a story about four cave people (Stevie, Fely, Tim, and Lauren) who try to invent a way to allow their wheelless bicycle to move along the ground.
543	18	"Fantastic Buildings"	Robot Number One	Machines	9 November 2011
Stevie uses his plastic kitchen equipment to build a miniature city. Lauren builds a tower. Fely works as an architect and designs a futuristic cubby house for her toys. Lauren cleans a window with a sponge and a squeegee. Tim, Stevie, and Casey pretend to be beavers building a lodge in the river while rapping. Casey visits Chats's home; a special place where she can be herself. Lauren draws an imaginary house. Sharing Stories: Lauren tells a story about three robots (Tim, Fely, and Stevie) from a toy factory, who decide to visit the beach and set up an ice cream stand, where they use their factory experience to build an ice cream boat for a customer (Casey).
544	19	"Time Machine"	Robot Number One	Machines	10 November 2011
Stevie imagines travelling back to prehistoric times and meeting a baby triceratops. Lauren makes cave music using tapping sticks. Casey and Chats imagine that their ancestors, a blacksmith and a prospector, were friends who mined for gold together. Lauren pretends to pan and dig for gold by miming the actions. Tim uses a time machine to explore how dance music has changed over time. Fely wonders what she will look like as a grandmother in the future, and uses dress-ups to help imagine. Lauren runs a galactic hair salon and styles futuristic wigs. Sharing Stories: Casey tells a story about four cave people (Stevie, Fely, Tim, and Lauren) who try to invent a way to allow their wheelless bicycle to move along the ground.
545	20	"Planes, Trains and Automobiles"	Robot Number One	Machines	11 November 2011
Casey shows Chats how she once used a scooter and a pogo stick to travel around the world. Lauren bounces on a pogo stick. Fely goes for a ride in a hot air balloon. Lauren tries to hold on to a bunch of balloons. Tim becomes a train conductor and listens to the sounds that three different trains make. Stevie works as a bus driver in the country, taking his animal passengers on a tour of the scenery. Lauren pumps the tyres of her bicycle before going for a ride. Sharing Stories: Lauren tells a story about three robots (Tim, Fely, and Stevie) from a toy factory, who decide to visit the beach and set up an ice cream stand, where they use their factory experience to build an ice cream boat for a customer (Casey).
546	21	"Star Magic"	Wish Upon a Star	Dreaming	14 November 2011
Casey and Chats imagine floating through the sky in a boat and fishing for magical starfish. Lauren pretends to go fishing for stars from an imaginary pier. Stevie dresses up as a shooting star superhero and helps the moon on a special mission. Lauren pretends to be a party sparkler. Tim experiments with sounds on his keyboard to write a song for a star-themed party. Fely visits the backyard at night to stargaze, searching for patterns of stars in the sky. Lauren pretends to be a shooting star powered by wishes. Sharing Stories: Tim tells a story about a pig (Casey) who dreams of flying, which leads her to seek flying lessons from her encouraging farmyard friends (Stevie and Fely) and a mysterious cat (Lauren) with magical powers.
547	22	"Dreaming"	Wish Upon a Star	Dreaming	15 November 2011
Casey tries to help Chats fall asleep by getting her to count shooting stars. Lauren demonstrates her different sleeping positions. Fely imagines being a mermaid and counting fish in the coral reef. Lauren pretends to be a clownfish. Tim pretends to be a grandfather frog trying to help his baby frogs sleep by singing them a lullaby. Stevie decorates a large dreamcatcher to hang above his bed. Lauren prepares a shoebox bed for a toy possum to sleep in. Sharing Stories: Stevie tells a story about a girl (Fely) who loses her favourite bed pillow, and dreams of meeting the jungle animals (Lauren, Tim, and Casey) from the pillow's design.
548	23	"When I Grow Up"	Wish Upon a Star	Dreaming	16 November 2011
Fely works on a building site and checks to see if her construction machinery is working efficiently. Lauren dresses in workwear and shifts bricks in order to build a wall. Casey participates in Chats's pretend radio show by phoning in to identify mystery sound effects. Lauren plays an imaginary piano. Tim imagines being a racing car driver and a painter. Stevie follows a series of clues to uncover a mystery occupation. Lauren puts on hats worn for different jobs. Sharing Stories: Tim tells a story about a pig (Casey) who dreams of flying, which leads her to seek flying lessons from her encouraging farmyard friends (Stevie and Fely) and a mysterious cat (Lauren) with magical powers.
549	24	"Journeys of Imagination"	Wish Upon a Star	Dreaming	17 November 2011
Casey and Chats imagine visiting the fun park and riding on a roller coaster and carousel. Lauren dresses up as a ringmaster and introduces the Hi-5 fun park. Stevie goes for an imaginary ride on a rainbow-coloured horse that can fly. Lauren pretends to be a show pony in a competition. Tim imagines visiting the North Pole after he discovers a new snow dome in his collection. Fely imagines travelling inside an oversized bubble to a fantasy land made up completely of bubbles. Lauren blows bubbles of different sizes. Sharing Stories: Stevie tells a story about a girl (Fely) who loses her favourite bed pillow, and dreams of meeting the jungle animals (Lauren, Tim, and Casey) from the pillow's design.
550	25	"Wishes"	Wish Upon a Star	Dreaming	18 November 2011
Stevie dresses up as a genie and searches for a magical lamp to live in. Lauren puts together a genie costume for a fancy dress-up party. Fely places a wishing well in the garden and wishes to meet her secret friend. Lauren pretends to be a fairy and searches for Fely's secret friend. Tim discovers a magical lamp and is granted some new musical instruments. Casey and Chats prepare for a solar eclipse and decide to make wishes upon the magical phenomenon. Lauren performs a magical spell in the hope of becoming a fast swimmer. Sharing Stories: Tim tells a story about a pig (Casey) who dreams of flying, which leads her to seek flying lessons from her encouraging farmyard friends (Stevie and Fely) and a mysterious cat (Lauren) with magical powers.
551	26	"Human Body"	Five Senses	About Me	21 November 2011
Stevie builds an exercise circuit with equipment to make his workouts more exciting. Lauren explores how joints help her arms and legs to bend. Casey spells the word "face" by using her body to make the letter shapes while stretching. Lauren goes for a walk around Alphabet City. Tim discovers he can make music without instruments, by using his body to make percussion sounds. Fely creates a workout routine with exercises inspired by the panther. Lauren demonstrates how she uses the different muscles in her body. Sharing Stories: Fely tells a story about a peacock (Stevie) who is embarrassed by his large tail, so journeys along with his other self-conscious friends (Casey and Tim) to ask a wise elephant (Lauren) to change their special features.
552	27	"Food"	Five Senses	About Me	22 November 2011
Stevie tries to choose a vegetable costume to wear to a dress-up party. Lauren sings about her favourite vegetables. Casey and Chats try something different when they swap their usual breakfasts with each other. Lauren pretends to be a peppermint tea bag being dipped in a cup. Tim holds a Cajun feast and is joined by the rest of Hi-5 to play Cajun music. Fely prepares healthy snacks in lunchboxes for Hi-5 to eat. Lauren makes trail mix as an energy snack for a walk. Sharing Stories: Casey tells a story about a hungry tortoise (Lauren) who searches for a fast way to travel to the farmer's vegetable patch and join her animal friends (Stevie, Fely, and Tim) for a meal.
553	28	"I'm Special"	Five Senses	About Me	23 November 2011
Casey tries to cure Chats's hiccups with a tongue twister. Lauren tries to find a way to give Tim a surprise. Stevie thinks of different things he can do and make with newspaper. Lauren dresses up as a wizard with a hat and cape made of newspaper. Tim goes for a walk in the country and meets a farmer (Fely), who communicates to her sheepdog (Casey) through whistling. Fely attempts to cross a set of monkey bars and beat her swinging record. Lauren swings around like a monkey. Sharing Stories: Fely tells a story about a peacock (Stevie) who is embarrassed by his large tail, so journeys along with his other self-conscious friends (Casey and Tim) to ask a wise elephant (Lauren) to change their special features.
554	29	"Sensory Play"	Five Senses	About Me	24 November 2011
Casey completes a sensory obstacle course while blindfolded, by carefully listening to Chats's instructions. Lauren plays a game of pin the tail on the donkey. Stevie makes different shapes with clay using a potter's wheel. Lauren makes a face using play dough. Tim remembers the sounds he heard at night when he visited Casey in the country. Fely contrasts the textures of some smooth and rough items and creates pencil rubbings to record the surfaces. Lauren pretends to drive a car. Sharing Stories: Casey tells a story about a hungry tortoise (Lauren) who searches for a fast way to travel to the farmer's vegetable patch and join her animal friends (Stevie, Fely, and Tim) for a meal.
555	30	"Happy"	Five Senses	About Me	25 November 2011
Casey bumps her funny bone and visits Chats, who is pretending to be a doctor, for an x-ray. Lauren pretends to be a laughing kookaburra. Fely works as a psychiatrist and tries to make a sad elephant patient feel better. Lauren tries to reach an itchy spot on her back. Tim plays his guitar to feel happy and imagines playing his electric guitar at a rock concert. Stevie makes a smiley face to welcome a visitor from far away. Lauren plays a game, acting out different emotions according to the faces on a mat. Sharing Stories: Fely tells a story about a peacock (Stevie) who is embarrassed by his large tail, so journeys along with his other self-conscious friends (Casey and Tim) to ask a wise elephant (Lauren) to change their special features.
556	31	"Friendship"	Some Kind of Wonderful (Note: Labelled as "Wonderful")	Friends	28 November 2011
Casey is introduced to Chats's imaginary friend and tries to make him feel welcome. Lauren plays and dances with her imaginary fairy friend. Stevie plays a ring toss game with two cylinder-shaped friends. Lauren dances alongside a silly clone of herself. Tim sings a capella on a camping trip when he forgets to bring his harmonica. Fely makes friendship bracelets for Lauren and Casey using patterns of coloured beads on a string. Lauren plays a game with Casey acting as her arms. Sharing Stories: Lauren tells a story about a girl (Fely) with an imaginary friend (Stevie) who her parents (Casey and Tim) fail to recognise, before he helps out while preparing for a family road trip.
557	32	"Animal Friends"	Some Kind of Wonderful	Friends	29 November 2011
Stevie prepares beds of different shapes for some animals who come to visit him inside on a rainy day. Lauren tries to train her dog (Tim) and teach him how to follow directions. Fely journeys into the bush at night in search of nocturnal animals. Lauren pretends to be an owl sleepwalking during the daytime. Tim the jungle ranger matches the sounds of his animal friends with instruments for a special song and dance performance. Casey tries to figure out which animal Chats has chosen to keep as a pet. Lauren puts on a moose show using two puppets. Sharing Stories: Stevie tells a story about a boy (Tim) who tells his animal friends (Lauren, Fely, and Casey) about someone special who will be arriving to live with them, leading the animals to prepare a space to welcome the newcomer.
558	33	"Families"	Some Kind of Wonderful	Friends	30 November 2011
Casey and Chats pretend to be the parents of a potato which is decorated to look like a baby. Lauren prepares food for a baby's lunch by mashing fruit and vegetables. Stevie explores how different members of his family all move in different ways. Lauren performs a cheer to celebrate her family. Tim explores how different instruments groups are like families with brothers and sisters. Fely uses cardboard boxes to builds a house for a family of toy dolls to move into. Lauren takes her family of toes for a swim when she dips her feet in a paddling pool. Sharing Stories: Lauren tells a story about a girl (Fely) with an imaginary friend (Stevie) who her parents (Casey and Tim) fail to recognise, before he helps out while preparing for a family road trip.
559	34	"Celebrations with Friends"	Some Kind of Wonderful	Friends	1 December 2011
Casey and Chats write a song to celebrate birthdays all around the world. Lauren choreographs a dance to match a birthday song. Stevie wraps his Christmas presents with a variety of paper and boxes of different sizes. Lauren writes a letter to Santa Claus to keep herself occupied on Christmas Eve. Tim makes a Mexican piñata for a party game and tests it out with Casey and Stevie. Fely arranges a colourful pattern of cakes for a "meet-your-neighbours" party. Lauren grows a sunflower puppet in a pot. Sharing Stories: Stevie tells a story about a boy (Tim) who tells his animal friends (Lauren, Fely, and Casey) about someone special who will be arriving to live with them, leading the animals to prepare a space to welcome the newcomer.
560	35	"Making Friends"	Some Kind of Wonderful	Friends	2 December 2011
Fely makes some new friends when she crafts some sock puppets. Lauren pretends to be a sock looking for her lost partner. Stevie becomes a caveman and uses a large rock to make a woolly mammoth friend. Lauren moves like a woolly mammoth. Tim pretends to be a hippo who befriends an African oxpecker bird (Stevie). Casey helps Chats to feel confident in meeting new people. Lauren says hello and goodbye by waving in small and large ways. Sharing Stories: Lauren tells a story about a girl (Fely) with an imaginary friend (Stevie) who her parents (Casey and Tim) fail to recognise, before he helps out while preparing for a family road trip.
561	36	"Games"	Ready or Not	Games	5 December 2011
Stevie and Tim practise playing silly party games; a sack race, egg-and-spoon race, and a three-legged race. Lauren pretends to juggle with three imaginary eggs. Casey is given a series of directions by Chats, to help her find a Snakes and Ladders board game. Lauren slithers like a snake; over, under, and through obstacles in her space. Tim and Stevie play a musical statues game, where they must freeze in a pose of playing an instrument. Fely prepares a dress-up game for Casey, with the pieces of a fairy costume hidden in her wall. Lauren pretends to be a fairy completing her athletics training. Sharing Stories: Tim tells a story about an eccentric talking moose (Lauren) who visits two children (Stevie and Casey) on a rainy day, and entertains them while their mother (Fely) carries out a special task.
562	37	"Teams"	Ready or Not	Games	6 December 2011
Stevie plays a freeze tag game with the rest of Hi-5, called Stuck in the Mud. Lauren practises a cheer for her team. Casey and Chats get energised by using sports language to talk about basketball. Lauren plays basketball as Casey holds the basket over her head. Tim writes a song for the Hi-5 hopping team to help them keep in time with each other. Fely decides to try out for the tennis team, but must change her sport when Jup Jup replaces the ball. Lauren pretends to be a baseball player. Sharing Stories: Lauren tells a story about four crabs living on the beach (Fely, Casey, Stevie, and Tim), who dare to do something new when they try surfing on driftwood.
563	38	"Inside Sports"	Ready or Not	Games	7 December 2011
Fely invents a game to play inside on a rainy day using a balloon and scarves. Lauren plays a game of punching ball with a balloon on an elastic band. Stevie rearranges his bedroom and turns it into an indoor sports ground. Lauren bounces on a hopper ball with handles. Tim completes a fitness course moving at different speeds; adagio, presto, and moderato. Casey and Chats try to find the right hog call they need to attract a pig. Lauren sings about a pig who is stuck in the mud. Sharing Stories: Tim tells a story about an eccentric talking moose (Lauren) who visits two children (Stevie and Casey) on a rainy day, and entertains them while their mother (Fely) carries out a special task.
564	39	"Animal Sports Day"	Ready or Not	Games	8 December 2011
Fely pretends to be a joey trying to break her jumping record. Lauren pretends to be a kangaroo jumping around in the bush. Stevie the snow goose teaches his class of young geese how to fly together in formation. Lauren practises her snow goose flying and landing. Tim becomes a ranger and helps three different animals develop exercises to match the way they move. Casey and Chats come up with some energetic new names for her animal aerobic exercises. Lauren the fruit bat wakes up from a long sleep and searches for fruit to eat. Sharing Stories: Lauren tells a story about four crabs living on the beach (Fely, Casey, Stevie, and Tim), who dare to do something new when they try surfing on driftwood.
565	40	"Sideshow Alley"	Ready or Not	Games	9 December 2011
Fely becomes a circus acrobat and works on her ring dive trick, before Jup Jup changes the size of the hoop. Lauren and the rest of Hi-5 perform a balancing act together. Casey practises walking across a tightrope for her circus act, while Chats acts as the ringmaster. Lauren pretends to be a dancing ballerina from the inside of a music box. Tim hosts the Hi-5 circus parade, presenting the acts as he plays the music for the show. Stevie plays a game of skittles using different balls to knock over a stack of tin cans. Lauren pretends to be a skittle. Sharing Stories: Tim tells a story about an eccentric talking moose (Lauren) who visits two children (Stevie and Casey) on a rainy day, and entertains them while their mother (Fely) carries out a special task.
566	41	"Making Music"	Making Music	Music	12 December 2011
Fely sings opera while matching the pitches of musical glasses filled to different levels. Lauren pretends to be an opera singer warming up with vocal exercises before a performance. Stevie becomes the captain of a marching band and helps his team practise walking in time together. Lauren adds some new moves to her marching routine to make it more exciting. DJ Tim and his country friend Stevie compare music from the city and country, and try to combine the two styles together. Casey acts as a tape recorder and tries to remember Chats's song to relay it back to her. Lauren tries to remember the moves of her dance by performing it in reverse. Sharing Stories: Fely tells a story about a lonely king (Tim) who summons a tricky magic jester (Stevie) to help him find something exciting to do: a request which culminates in him forming a band with two other royals (Casey and Lauren).
567	42	"Dancing"	Making Music	Music	13 December 2011
Stevie practises bush dancing in the shape of a square along with Casey, Fely, and Tim. Lauren and Fely perform a bush dance. Casey invents a musical mat which allows her to dance along to three different styles of music. Lauren dresses up as a jazz-singing scat cat. Tim pretends to be a bee who performs a special dance to assist his swarm on their search for flowers. Fely practises a hip hop dance routine by following the steps on a chart. Lauren does some hip hop dance moves. Sharing Stories: Lauren tells a story about a squirrel (Casey) who forgets to collect nuts for the winter like her friends (Fely, Tim, and Stevie), when she is preoccupied with writing songs to play on her lute.
568	43	"Music Around the World"	Making Music	Music	14 December 2011
Fely decorates a hat for a Brazilian carnival. Lauren arranges a platter of fruit. Stevie the Scottish laird tries to remember how to perform his award-winning Highland Fling dance. Lauren dances in a pair of clogs from Holland. Tim plays an African mbira while he and the rest of Hi-5 learn how to say "hello" and "goodbye" in Swazi. Casey and Chats dress up in traditional saris from India. Lauren dances to traditional Indian music. Sharing Stories: Fely tells a story about a lonely king (Tim) who summons a tricky magic jester (Stevie) to help him find something exciting to do: a request which culminates in him forming a band with two other royals (Casey and Lauren).
569	44	"Sounds in Nature"	Making Music	Music	15 December 2011
Fely creates a way for gorillas to talk and communicate with each other. Lauren dresses up as a gorilla for a jungle dance. Stevie becomes a birdwatcher, looking for rare creatures at the imaginary Kitchen Sink Swamp. Lauren sings about five little ducks using finger puppets. Tim meets a talking tree (Fely) and discovers how nature can be musical. Casey and Chats communicate in the language of a cicada by making drumming sounds. Lauren pretends to be a cicada breaking out of its shell. Sharing Stories: Lauren tells a story about a squirrel (Casey) who forgets to collect nuts for the winter like her friends (Fely, Tim, and Stevie), when she is preoccupied with writing songs to play on her lute.
570	45	"Musical Instruments"	Making Music	Music	16 December 2011
Stevie paints patterns on a cardboard tube to replicate a didgeridoo from Australian Aboriginal culture. Lauren plays a pair of tapping sticks. Fely crafts her own set of musical wind chimes using metal kitchen utensils. Lauren makes music using pots and pans from the kitchen. Tim pretends to be a penguin conducting an orchestra composed of his hungry friends. Casey plays the concertina, with Chats reminding her when to stretch and squeeze. Lauren pretends to be a concertina. Sharing Stories: Fely tells a story about a lonely king (Tim) who summons a tricky magic jester (Stevie) to help him find something exciting to do: a request which culminates in him forming a band with two other royals (Casey and Lauren).

== Home video releases ==
=== Compilation releases ===
Series	DVD Title	Release Date (Region 4)	Songs of the Week	Special features	Ref.
13	Amazing	DVD: 17 November 2011	Wow!; Underwater Discovery; L.O.V.E.	—N/a	
13	Ready or Not	DVD: 5 January 2012	Ready or Not; Robot Number One; Five Senses	—N/a	
13	Make a Wish	DVD: 1 March 2012	Wish Upon a Star; Making Music; Some Kind of Wonderful	—N/a	
13	Sharing Stories 3	DVD: 21 June 2012	Making Music; Underwater Discovery; Wish Upon a Star; Robot Number One; Wow!; L.O.V.E.; Five Senses; Ready or Not; Some Kind of Wonderful	"Chats with Chats" featurette	

=== Full episode releases ===
Series	DVD Title	Release Date (Region 4)	Songs of the Week	Episodes	Special features	Ref.
13	Discovery	DVD: 14 November 2012	Wow!; Underwater Discovery; Some Kind of Wonderful	"Wonders of the World" (Series 13, Episode 1); "At the Beach" (Series 13, Episode 8); "Animal Friends" (Series 13, Episode 32)	—N/a	
13	Let's Play!	DVD: 9 January 2013	Making Music; Ready or Not; Five Senses	"Making Music" (Series 13, Episode 41); "Games" (Series 13, Episode 36); "Human Body" (Series 13, Episode 26)	—N/a	
13	Feeling Fine	DVD: 6 March 2013	Five Senses; L.O.V.E.; Some Kind of Wonderful	"Food" (Series 13, Episode 27); "Favourite Things" (Series 13, Episode 15); "Friendship" (Series 13, Episode 31)	Hi-5 World Vision visit to Cambodia featurette	
