= Hi-5 series 12 =

Hi-5
- Series 12
- Starring: Lauren Brant; Casey Burgess; Fely Irvine; Tim Maddren; Stevie Nicholson
- No. of episodes: 45

Release
- Original network: Nine Network
- Original release: 13 September – 12 November 2010

Season chronology
- ← Previous; Series 11 Next → Series 13

The twelfth series of the children's television series Hi-5 aired between 13 September 2010 and 12 November 2010 on the Nine Network in Australia. The series was produced by Southern Star and Nine with Noel Price as executive producer. The series featured the 500th episode.

== Production ==
Following the Nine Network and Southern Star's acquisition of the Hi-5 franchise in 2008, a deal was made to produce five new series of the programme featuring the "new generation" cast. Southern Star produced the first of these five series in 2009, and begun production of the second in 2010.

Noel Price returned as the executive producer for his second series, continuing the goal of capturing the innocence and magic of the program's earlier episodes. All five cast members, Lauren Brant, Casey Burgess, Fely Irvine, Tim Maddren, and Stevie Nicholson, returned for the twelfth series.

The twelfth series premiered on 13 September 2010. It contained the 500th episode of Hi-5, which aired in October. The series debuted nine new feature Songs of the Week and introduced a new element in the Sharing Stories segment; a "Hidden Treasure" for viewers to search for.

== Cast ==
=== Presenters ===
- Lauren Brant – Body Move
- Casey Burgess – Word Play
- Fely Irvine – Puzzles and Patterns
- Tim Maddren – Making Music
- Stevie Nicholson – Shapes in Space

== Episodes ==
No. overall	No. in series	Title	Song of the Week	Theme	Original release date
481	1	"Pets"	Hi-5 Farm	Animal Fun	13 September 2010
Fely prepares the things she would need for a pet puppy, while Jup Jup surprises her with items for a cat. Lauren pretends to be a kitten waking up from a cat nap. Stevie imagines being a goldfish to figure out what items to place in a fish tank. Lauren uses two castanets as snapping clam shells. Tim the pet vet plays a calming song to relax the animals in his waiting room. Fit Bit Tips: Stevie and Tim learn how to pat a dog. Casey meets Chats's pet coconuts and tries to find a way to talk to them. Lauren pretends to be a coconut searching for a way to move around. Sharing Stories: Stevie tells a story about two sheep (Tim and Lauren) who don't want to be shorn by their farmer (Fely), and are inspired by the new sheepdog (Casey) to ask for a different haircut style.
482	2	"On the Farm"	Hi-5 Farm	Animal Fun	14 September 2010
Stevie dresses up as a scarecrow in order to scare away the crows from his corn plants. Lauren uses finger puppets to act out three crows waiting for corn cobs to grow. Fely works as a farmer and sorts fresh eggs to give to the rest of Hi-5. Lauren creates an egg costume to wear to a fancy dress party. Tim visits the country and uses unusual equipment to discover new musical sounds. Fit Bit Tips: Stevie and Tim learn how to go trotting when riding a horse. Casey tries to determine the most suitable food to give to each of the baby animals that Chats dresses up as. Lauren pretends to be a foal learning how to walk. Sharing Stories: Fely tells a story about three farm animals (Casey, Tim, and Lauren) who decide to trade places with each other when they each believe they have the most challenging role on the farm, much to the surprise of the farmer (Stevie).
483	3	"Jungle Adventure"	Hi-5 Farm	Animal Fun	15 September 2010
Stevie goes on a jungle safari, looking for jungle animals in his jeep. Lauren makes mystery animal shapes behind a screen, for Fely to guess. Casey the tiger decides to find a new roar when she becomes tired of her tiger sound. Lauren pretends to be a mongoose looking for a new place to live. Tim goes camping in the jungle, and hears someone else's drum beat while he plays his bongos. Fit Bit Tips: Stevie and Tim learn how to scale a rock climbing wall. Jungle doctor Fely attends to some animal patients in the wild. Lauren pretends to be a frog with a sore foot, hopping across the lily pads using one leg. Sharing Stories: Stevie tells a story about two sheep (Tim and Lauren) who don't want to be shorn by their farmer (Fely), and are inspired by the new sheepdog (Casey) to ask for a different haircut style.
484	4	"Animals with Jobs"	Hi-5 Farm	Animal Fun	16 September 2010
Casey works as a trainer and teaches Chats tricks as she pretends to be a performing seal. Lauren pretends to be a seal performing tricks to entertain a crowd. Stevie acts as a bee working to make honeycomb with hexagon shapes. Lauren dresses up as a bee to make a honey sandwich. Tim works as a police officer and tries finds a sound to represent his police horse as it moves. Fit Bit Tips: Stevie and Tim learn how to ride a horse. Fely pretends to be a horse transporting animals tourists around a snowy park in her cart. Lauren imagines being a duck dressing up for a disco party. Sharing Stories: Fely tells a story about three farm animals (Casey, Tim, and Lauren) who decide to trade places with each other when they each believe they have the most challenging role on the farm, much to the surprise of the farmer (Stevie).
485	5	"Under the Sea"	Hi-5 Farm	Animal Fun	17 September 2010
Fely pretends to be an octopus and counts collections of items under the sea. Lauren moves like a periwinkle being thrown around by the waves. Casey dresses up in a seahorse costume and competes in a race which Chats commentates. Lauren acts as a manta ray moving around underwater. Tim becomes King Neptuna and sets out to recruit sea creatures to help him perform a musical symphony. Fit Bit Tips: Stevie and Tim learn how to sail a boat. Stevie goes whale watching out at sea and meets a singing whale. Lauren operates two seabird puppets which fly over the ocean. Sharing Stories: Stevie tells a story about two sheep (Tim and Lauren) who don't want to be shorn by their farmer (Fely), and are inspired by the new sheepdog (Casey) to ask for a different haircut style.
486	6	"Things That Grow"	Stand Up Tall on Tippy Toes	Growing	20 September 2010
Casey teaches Chats how two different words can be combined to create a new word. Lauren pretends to be a chef while flipping pancakes. Fely practises her juggling to improve her circus skills. Lauren tries to throw three juggling balls into a top hat. Tim becomes a prospector and explores the musical sounds of crystals growing inside a cave. Fit Bit Tips: Stevie and Tim learn how to long jump. Stevie builds a house of cards and observes the triangle shapes as it grows. Lauren builds an imaginary house. Sharing Stories: Lauren tells a story about a family of goats (Stevie, Casey, and Tim) living on the hillside, who are supplied with a variety of healthy new foods from a superhero goat (Fely) when they are tired of their usual meal of grass.
487	7	"Building"	Stand Up Tall on Tippy Toes	Growing	21 September 2010
Fely works as a builder and constructs a house for a family of stuffed toys. Lauren builds a cubby to rest inside. Casey puts together a costume and challenges Chats to guess what she is dressing up as. Lauren pretends to be a rocket launching into outer space. Tim dresses up as a possum and searches for items to use as instruments in a bush band. Fit Bit Tips: Stevie and Tim learn how to hold a hockey stick and hit the ball. Stevie builds a miniature model of a growing city using blocks of different shapes. Lauren uses her body to make the shape of a bridge over a river. Sharing Stories: Casey tells a story about a couple (Tim and Lauren) with a garden of flowers, who order a new flower (Fely) from an alien (Stevie), which grows at an unusual pace to the size of a tree.
488	8	"Growing Up"	Stand Up Tall on Tippy Toes	Growing	22 September 2010
Stevie roleplays as a dog who has grown too large for its bowl and bed. Lauren pretends to be a dog digging in the dirt for a bone. Casey helps Chats use a megaphone to magnify her voice and become a giant from a fairytale. Lauren builds a miniature castle for a queen. Tim practises playing the air guitar and forms an air band with Stevie and Casey. Fit Bit Tips: Stevie and Tim learn how to do a forward roll. Fely remembers how she wanted to be a singer as a child and the different ways she practised. Lauren, Casey, and Fely dress up as singing stars in the night sky. Sharing Stories: Lauren tells a story about a family of goats (Stevie, Casey, and Tim) living on the hillside, who are supplied with a variety of healthy new foods from a superhero goat (Fely) when they are tired of their usual meal of grass.
489	9	"Gardens"	Stand Up Tall on Tippy Toes	Growing	23 September 2010
Stevie trims the branches of three trees to create designs of different shapes. Lauren dresses up as a spiky cactus. Fely plants baby pumpkins in her garden, which Jup Jup helps to magically grow. Lauren performs a dance while holding pumpkins. Tim pretends to be a worker bee and sings a song to help energise his bee friends. Fit Bit Tips: Stevie and Tim learn how to perform a karate fall. Casey introduces Chats to her collection of bonsai trees and tells her their names. Lauren performs a traditional Japanese dance. Sharing Stories: Casey tells a story about a couple (Tim and Lauren) with a garden of flowers, who order a new flower (Fely) from an alien (Stevie), which grows at an unusual pace to the size of a tree.
490	10	"Strong Bodies"	Stand Up Tall on Tippy Toes	Growing	24 September 2010
Casey helps Chats sing a tongue twister to exercise the brain. Lauren twists her body into different shapes. Stevie pretends to be a worker ant using his power lifting strength to clean the garden. Lauren practises marching while dressed up as an ant. Tim composes pieces of music to be played during different types of exercise. Fit Bit Tips: Stevie and Tim learn how to play tennis. Fely makes popcorn when Jup Jup exchanges her corncobs for popping corn kernels. Lauren pretends to be a party popper. Sharing Stories: Lauren tells a story about a family of goats (Stevie, Casey, and Tim) living on the hillside, who are supplied with a variety of healthy new foods from a superhero goat (Fely) when they are tired of their usual meal of grass.
491	11	"Experiments"	Martian Groove	Discovery	27 September 2010
Fely sets up measuring equipment on her windowsill to determine what the weather will be like. Lauren pretends to be a tumbleweed rolling in the wind. Stevie observes how a drop of dishwashing detergent can make a bread tag move like a powerboat. Lauren sails around the world in an imaginary boat. Tim makes music by experimenting with glass bottles filled to different levels with water. Fit Bit Tips: Stevie and Tim learn how to play mini-golf. Casey is tested when Chats conducts an experiment to determine how curious she is. Lauren opens a box which produces different animal sounds. Sharing Stories: Fely tells a story about four astronauts (Lauren, Casey, Tim, and Stevie) who journey to space in a rocketship, and try to decide who will be the first to step on the moon.
492	12	"In Nature"	Martian Groove	Discovery	28 September 2010
Stevie the bird of paradise meets a new friend in his tropical rainforest home: a bird of a paradise plant who looks the same as him. Flamingo Lauren balances with her mirror reflection. Fely discovers that a bowerbird has been collecting her blue items from the backyard. Lauren the blue bird dances the Blue Bird Bop. Tim discovers different sounds while hiking in the bush, and writes a song using what he hears. Fit Bit Tips: Stevie and Tim learn how to ride a horse. Casey and Chats imagine flying on a beetle and seeing things which look much bigger from a beetle's perspective. Lauren pretends to be a lady beetle scuttling around. Sharing Stories: Tim tells a story about two scientists (Casey and Stevie) who travel to the jungles of Central America to discover rare golden frogs (Lauren and Fely), but find that they are away on a fly fishing holiday.
493	13	"Outer Space"	Martian Groove	Discovery	29 September 2010
Stevie builds a rocket using cardboard and a spacesuit using other recycled materials. Lauren uses silver gloves to turn her hands into a pretend rocket. Fely works as a mechanic and services a spaceship that appears in her garage. Lauren operates a miniature flying saucer piloted by alien finger puppets. Tim and Stevie find different musical sounds to use as sound effects for their outer space adventure. Fit Bit Tips: Stevie and Tim learn how to perform a backwards flip on a bungee trampoline. Casey and Chats use an old radio transceiver to send and receive messages from outer space. Lauren pretends to be a satellite dish receiving a signal from outer space. Sharing Stories: Fely tells a story about four astronauts (Lauren, Casey, Tim, and Stevie) who journey to space in a rocketship, and try to decide who will be the first to step on the moon.
494	14	"Something New"	Martian Groove	Discovery	30 September 2010
Fely practises playing tennis before Jup Jup swaps her racquet for a badminton racquet. Lauren plays a miniature game of soccer with a finger puppet. Stevie observes two different shapes and creates new names to describe them. Lauren moves her body like a spring. Tim plays a hand-clapping and foot-stomping game with Casey. Fit Bit Tips: Stevie and Tim learn how to play ten-pin bowling. Casey helps Chats to discover that her new freckle can be viewed as a beauty spot. Lauren decorates two balloon faces with different features. Sharing Stories: Tim tells a story about two scientists (Casey and Stevie) who travel to the jungles of Central America to discover rare golden frogs (Lauren and Fely), but find that they are away on a fly fishing holiday.
495	15	"Why I'm Special"	Martian Groove	Discovery	1 October 2010
Stevie hosts a game show in which Tim must guess the shapes that he describes. Lauren performs a cheer to celebrate circles. Casey practises Makaton and teaches Chats how to communicate using her hands. Lauren conducts an imaginary orchestra using a baton. Tim works as an instructor at a preschool for puppies and teaches them how to bark together in harmony. Fit Bit Tips: Stevie and Tim learn how to hip hop dance. Fely dresses up as a detective to determine who has taken her missing fruit. Lauren turns paintings of her handprint into pictures of sea creatures. Sharing Stories: Fely tells a story about four astronauts (Lauren, Casey, Tim, and Stevie) who journey to space in a rocketship, and try to decide who will be the first to step on the moon.
496	16	"Bedrooms and Bathrooms"	Happy House	Home	4 October 2010
Casey tries wearing a week's worth of clothes at once to prepare for a variety of weather and events. Lauren wears a raincoat to perform a rain dance. Fely exchanges her thick winter quilt for lighter springtime bedsheets. Lauren dresses up as a flower and performs a springtime stretching routine. Tim pretends to be a builder bird who constructs a new nest while singing in harmony with Casey and Stevie. Fit Bit Tips: Stevie and Tim learn how to travel on a flying fox. Stevie imagines becoming the size of an apple to determine how to best pack his lunchbox. Lauren arranges a fruit and vegetable platter into a smiley face. Sharing Stories: Casey tells a story about a cassowary father (Tim) who tries to find the right home for his family of three very different creatures (Lauren, Fely, and Stevie).
497	17	"In the Kitchen"	Happy House	Home	5 October 2010
Fely sets the table for a dinner party with the rest of Hi-5. Lauren dresses up as a princess and looks for the best way to eat peas. Casey pretends to be a chef while Chats tricks her into cooking a tuna noodle casserole. Lauren, Stevie, and Tim dress up as a bunch of dancing bananas. Tim prepares lunch for Fely while making music with the ingredients. Fit Bit Tips: Stevie and Tim learn how to play hockey. Stevie uses vegetables as stamps to paint a picture of sheep on the farm. Lauren squeezes fresh oranges to make orange juice. Sharing Stories: Stevie tells a story about a koala (Tim) who turns his treehouse home into a café, but drives away the animal customers (Fely, Lauren, and Casey) due to his menu consisting entirely of gumleaf dishes.
498	18	"Backyard Games"	Happy House	Home	6 October 2010
Stevie prepares a game of hopscotch to play at his friend's balcony backyard. Lauren invents a balancing game that she can take anywhere. Casey and Chats create a new backyard game with their mixed-up sport equipment. Lauren plays with a hula hoop. Tim and the rest of Hi-5 play a skipping game in the backyard, using a song to keep the rhythm. Fit Bit Tips: Stevie and Tim learn how to play beach cricket. Fely goes camping in the backyard and tries to find the perfect place to set up her tent. Lauren pretends to be a backyard clothesline. Sharing Stories: Casey tells a story about a cassowary father (Tim) who tries to find the right home for his family of three very different creatures (Lauren, Fely, and Stevie).
499	19	"Fun with Friends"	Happy House	Home	7 October 2010
Stevie challenges his pet dog to find examples of different shapes around the bedroom. Lauren pretends to be a dog balancing on an exercise ball. Fely prepares a pizza before Jup Jup changes it into a calzone. Lauren demonstrates how her body can fold and bend. Tim and the rest of Hi-5 make music with junk while cleaning up the garage. Fit Bit Tips: Stevie and Tim learn how to play beach volleyball. Casey and Chats dress up in costumes for a party themed around the letter G and the colour green. Lauren dresses up as a pixie and makes pixie bread for a party. Sharing Stories: Stevie tells a story about a koala (Tim) who turns his treehouse home into a café, but drives away the animal customers (Fely, Lauren, and Casey) due to his menu consisting entirely of gumleaf dishes.
500	20	"Family"	Happy House	Home	8 October 2010
Stevie places pictures of the Hi-5 family into frames of different shapes which best represent each of them. Lauren stretches out her body like a spinning star. Casey decorates a batch of different-sized muffins to turn them into a muffin family. Lauren introduces the members of a babushka doll family. Tim pretends to be a member of the Kazoo family and hosts a reunion with his kazoo-playing relatives. Fit Bit Tips: Stevie and Tim learn how to use a hula hoop. Fely dresses up as a fairy and prepares for a visit from her fairy godmother. Lauren imagines being a fairy and experiments with wands of different sizes. Sharing Stories: Casey tells a story about a cassowary father (Tim) who tries to find the right home for his family of three very different creatures (Lauren, Fely, and Stevie).
501	21	"Making"	The Dancing Bus	Let's Do It	11 October 2010
Stevie builds a castle using boxes and pretends to become a knight. Lauren pretends to be a dragon learning to fly. Fely uses an old T-shirt to create something new. Lauren celebrates the T-shirt with a dance for the letter T. Tim becomes a one-man band so that he can play multiple instruments at once. Fit Bit Tips: Stevie and Tim learn how to play tennis. Casey and Chats explore a "word-in-a-box"; a jack-in-the-box with a guessing game inside. Lauren pretends to be a jack-in-the-box. Sharing Stories: Fely tells a story about a ballet teacher (Casey) who tries to prepare her students; a swan (Tim), a flamingo (Lauren), and an elephant (Stevie), for a concert, before the animals work together to remember the steps.
502	22	"Summer Holiday"	The Dancing Bus	Let's Do It	12 October 2010
Casey and Chats try to warm themselves up by imagining a summer holiday. Lauren makes some paper fans to cool herself down with. Fely has a summer holiday in her backyard, and Jup Jup helps her build a sandcastle. Mermaid Lauren does her morning exercises. Tim the sea turtle and his friends arrive on the Caribbean beach, and make island instruments. Fit Bit Tips: Stevie and Tim learn how to paddle a kayak. Stevie makes a sand picture to remember his holiday at the beach. Lauren dances with a beach ball. Sharing Stories: Lauren tells a story about the Sunny family (Casey, Fely, Tim, and Stevie), who are surprised when their long awaited summer holiday turns into a winter trip.
503	23	"Dance"	The Dancing Bus	Let's Do It	13 October 2010
Casey and Chats choreograph dance moves based on a shopping list of food items. Lauren marches around the supermarket with her shopping trolley. Stevie combines dancing with painting and uses his feet to create different patterns. Lauren makes percussive music with different parts of her body. Tim runs a tap dancing class and teaches his students how to tap and clap in time. Fit Bit Tips: Stevie and Tim learn how to tap dance. Fely practises tap dancing alongside Jup Jup and puts on a dazzling performance. Lauren practises dancing ballet moves. Sharing Stories: Fely tells a story about a ballet teacher (Casey) who tries to prepare her students; a swan (Tim), a flamingo (Lauren), and an elephant (Stevie), for a concert, before the animals work together to remember the steps.
504	24	"Winter Holiday"	The Dancing Bus	Let's Do It	14 October 2010
Casey and Chats visit the Arctic on an icebreaker and communicate with the surrounding animals. Lauren acts like an icebreaker ship moving through the ice. Stevie pretends to be a brown bear on a holiday in the North Pole getting ready to hibernate. Lauren packs her bag for a sleepover. Tim imagines being a toucan from South America who holidays to Antarctica and meets two penguins. Fit Bit Tips: Stevie and Tim learn how to jump on a trampoline. Fely visits the garden, where she clears the winter snow and builds a snowman. Lauren pretends to be a snowgirl and tries to keep warm. Sharing Stories: Lauren tells a story about the Sunny family (Casey, Fely, Tim, and Stevie), who are surprised when their long awaited summer holiday turns into a winter trip.
505	25	"Celebrations"	The Dancing Bus	Let's Do It	15 October 2010
Fely celebrates the first day of spring by baking a cake with spring berries. Lauren paints a surprise picture to celebrate spring. Casey helps Chats to celebrate her new hat by teaching her how to chant. Lauren performs a chant to show how much she loves to move. Tim organises a Mexican feast for Lauren with Mariachi music as entertainment. Fit Bit Tips: Stevie and Tim learn how to use a hula hoop. Stevie makes a giant birthday card for Tim, with birthday symbols inside. Lauren practises tying a bow using Tim's birthday present ribbons. Sharing Stories: Fely tells a story about a ballet teacher (Casey) who tries to prepare her students; a swan (Tim), a flamingo (Lauren), and an elephant (Stevie), for a concert, before the animals work together to remember the steps.
506	26	"Puppets"	Toy Box	Toys	18 October 2010
Casey acts as a voice-activated dinosaur puppet for Chats after her toy breaks. Lauren moves like a dinosaur. Fely turns a window into a puppet theatre and puts on a finger puppet show. Lauren performs a show-stopping dancing act on stage. Tim puts on a show with a life-sized marionette puppet and imagines singing a duet with her. Fit Bit Tips: Stevie and Tim learn how to fly like a star in the sky on a bungee trampoline. Stevie experiments with shadow puppets to tell a story about an apple tree and a bear. Lauren watches her shadow move while she dances. Sharing Stories: Tim tells a story about a girl (Fely) who uses a sock puppet to gain confidence in making friends (Casey, Lauren, and Stevie) after she moves into a new neighbourhood.
507	27	"Teddy Bear Adventures"	Toy Box	Toys	19 October 2010
Casey pretends to be a teddy bear packing her backpack with Chats before going on an adventure. Lauren dresses up as a polar bear for a boogie dance. Fely acts as a pirate who takes her teddy bear mate on a treasure hunt around the backyard. Lauren does a jig for treasure while dressed as a pirate. Tim pretends to be a teddy bear gathering his friends, who all play different types of flutes. Fit Bit Tips: Stevie and Tim learn how to sail a boat. Stevie acts as a bear who creates his own new teddy using a pillow. Lauren gives some tender loving care to her old teddy bear. Sharing Stories: Lauren tells a story about three teddy bears (Casey, Tim, and Fely) who set off on an adventure and discover that their tumbling acrobatic skills can be perfectly utilised in a travelling circus show, after they meet the show's ringmaster (Stevie).
508	28	"Games"	Toy Box	Toys	20 October 2010
Fely prepares a cup stacking game for a party. Lauren and Fely race to see who can stack their cups the quickest. Stevie and Casey play a shape game, matching their hands and feet to shapes decided by a spinner. Lauren pretends to be the arrow on a game spinner. Meerkat Tim and his friends play a game of musical mounds, like musical chairs. Fit Bit Tips: Stevie and Tim learn how to play hockey. Casey plays Chats's game of guessing items hidden behind curtains. Lauren pretends to be the grumble of a stomach. Sharing Stories: Tim tells a story about a girl (Fely) who uses a sock puppet to gain confidence in making friends (Casey, Lauren, and Stevie) after she moves into a new neighbourhood.
509	29	"Favourite Things"	Toy Box	Toys	21 October 2010
Fely pretends to be a firefighter when she visits the garden. Lauren tries to keep a balloon in the air and pretends it is flaming hot. Casey looks at Chats's favourite dictionary and the pair complete the letters of the alphabet together. Lauren sings about yawning and tries to stop her yawns. Tim recalls his holiday trip to Spain, and plays his guitar in the style of flamenco dancing music. Fit Bit Tips: Stevie and Tim learn how to do a forward roll. Stevie performs a favourite experiment involving the swirling flow of water. Lauren dances and moves like a tornado. Sharing Stories: Lauren tells a story about three teddy bears (Casey, Tim, and Fely) who set off on an adventure and discover that their tumbling acrobatic skills can be perfectly utilised in a travelling circus show, after they meet the show's ringmaster (Stevie).
510	30	"Sporty Things"	Toy Box	Toys	22 October 2010
Stevie pretends to be a monkey playing ten-pin bowling in the jungle. Lauren practises dance moves for a jungle party and makes music with coconuts. Fely plays with a hula hoop and practises tricks with different-sized hoops. Lauren crafts a garland made of flowers. Tim goes fly fishing with Fely, Casey, and Stevie, and they make music with the fishing rods. Fit Bit Tips: Stevie and Tim learn how to ride a bicycle. Casey makes a kite for Chats with letters and words making up the tail. Lauren pretends to be a kite flying in the sky. Sharing Stories: Tim tells a story about a girl (Fely) who uses a sock puppet to gain confidence in making friends (Casey, Lauren, and Stevie) after she moves into a new neighbourhood.
511	31	"Techno World"	Backyard Adventurers	Adventure	25 October 2010
Stevie pretends to be a robot testing out the functions of his different buttons. Lauren pretends to be a robot playing the electric guitar. Casey and Chats test out an imaginary mind-reading machine to guess each other's thoughts. Lauren rides on her new roller skates. Tim roleplays as an alien teaching his friends from Earth how to play space techno music. Fit Bit Tips: Stevie and Tim learn how to perform a backwards flip on a bungee trampoline. Fely acts like a secret spy and uses gadgets to uncover a hidden message. Lauren sneaks around her space while wearing super spy slippers. Sharing Stories: Stevie tells a story about three farm machines (Fely, Tim, and Lauren) who adventure to the city and assist a busy car (Casey) during their visit; before returning to their relaxing home in the country.
512	32	"Superheroes"	Backyard Adventurers	Adventure	26 October 2010
Stevie becomes an adventurer and searches for three shape keys needed to enter a cavern in the jungle. Lauren dresses up as a superhero who twirls a ribbon. Fely pretends to be a hero called Hat Girl, who provides hats to protect wild animals. Lauren tries to choose the most suitable cape for a superhero. Tim uses his imaginary supersonic hearing to assist people in musical need. Fit Bit Tips: Stevie and Tim learn how to travel on a flying fox. Casey becomes Word Woman, and analyses picture clues to solve a word problem. Lauren fills a baguette roll with healthy ingredients. Sharing Stories: Fely tells a story about four superheroes (Tim, Casey, Lauren, and Stevie) who race off to complete a mission without listening for their instructions first.
513	33	"Marvellous Machines"	Backyard Adventurers	Adventure	27 October 2010
Fely embarks on an Italian adventure and practises using a pasta machine. Lauren pretends that her body is made of spaghetti. Stevie tests out a machine that produces pieces of a billy cart needing to be joined together. Lauren goes for a ride on a billy cart. Tim pretends to be a wizard at a magic school teaching the students how to play the synthesizer. Fit Bit Tips: Stevie and Tim learn how to play basketball. Casey and Chats use a machine that creates poems. Lauren dresses up as a pirate parrot and walks along a perch. Sharing Stories: Stevie tells a story about three farm machines (Fely, Tim, and Lauren) who adventure to the city and assist a busy car (Casey) during their visit; before returning to their relaxing home in the country.
514	34	"Travelling Circus"	Backyard Adventurers	Adventure	28 October 2010
Fely visits the travelling circus and tests out the high striker game. Lauren plays a target game at the sideshow alley. Casey plays the laughing clown carnival game, while Chats pretends to be the clown. Lauren practises walking on stilts. Tim roleplays as the ringmaster and auditions performers for the grand parade. Fit Bit Tips: Stevie and Tim learn how to throw a frisbee. Stevie pretends to be a travelling circus clown who performs his balloon act for an audience. Lauren acts as a clown trying to hold onto a bunch of balloons. Sharing Stories: Fely tells a story about four superheroes (Tim, Casey, Lauren, and Stevie) who race off to complete a mission without listening for their instructions first.
515	35	"Pre School / Daycare Fun"	Backyard Adventurers	Adventure	29 October 2010
Stevie pretends to be a firefighter speaking about his job to the children at pre-school. Lauren acts as a firefighter putting out an imaginary fire. Fely works as a librarian sorting out books before the pre-school children arrive. Lauren places books on shelves at the library. Tim pretends to be a pig at pre-school who composes a nursery rhyme along with his friends. Fit Bit Tips: Stevie and Tim learn how to skip with a rope. Casey remembers the different excursions she attended as a child with her pre-school class. Lauren drives the zoo taxi and transports animals to their destinations. Sharing Stories: Stevie tells a story about three farm machines (Fely, Tim, and Lauren) who adventure to the city and assist a busy car (Casey) during their visit; before returning to their relaxing home in the country.
516	36	"Fairy Creatures"	Hey Presto!	Magic	1 November 2010
Stevie pretends to be an elf working in a shop that sells shapes to fairies. Lauren dances around a magical fairy ring. Fely works as the tooth fairy dentist and gives her patients their check-ups. Lauren dresses up as a fairy rabbit. Tim acts as a musical elf finding instruments from his barrow for other magical creatures. Fit Bit Tips: Stevie and Tim learn how to perform the yoga tree pose. When Casey's fairy costume is damaged, she and Chats reimagine it as a dress-up for a troll. Lauren untangles a doll's knotty hair. Sharing Stories: Casey tells a story about a fairy (Tim) who is waiting to get his wings, and seeks the help of his friends (Fely, Lauren, and Stevie) for ideas to help them grow faster.
517	37	"Magic in Nature"	Hey Presto!	Magic	2 November 2010
Fely pretends to be a spider and decorates a spider web with a pattern. Lauren moves around like a busy penny spider. Casey and Chats visit a magical wishing well and wish to see a sunset. Lauren dresses up in the colours of a sunrise. Tim and his panda friends turn their bamboo sticks into recorder-like musical instruments. Fit Bit Tips: Stevie and Tim learn how to scale a rock climbing wall. Stevie blows bubbles and captures designs of different shapes in print pictures. Lauren blows bubbles using a bubble wand and then pops them. Sharing Stories: Lauren tells a story about three students at a magic school (Casey, Fely, and Tim) with a new teacher (Stevie) who has never taught magic before.
518	38	"Magical Journeys"	Hey Presto!	Magic	3 November 2010
Casey and Chats imagine being ants in an ant farm and going on a journey to visit the queen. Lauren roleplays as a queen act practising her royal walk. Stevie enters through magical doors which lead to worlds full of different shapes. Lauren dresses up as a demolition worker wizard. Tim pretends to be a wizard travelling on a magic carpet and playing world music. Fit Bit Tips: Stevie and Tim learn how to go trotting when riding a horse. Fely imagines floating in the air on a garden deck chair being lifted by balloons. Lauren uses two balloons decorated as birds and teaches them to fly. Sharing Stories: Casey tells a story about a fairy (Tim) who is waiting to get his wings, and seeks the help of his friends (Fely, Lauren, and Stevie) for ideas to help them grow faster.
519	39	"Science Magic"	Hey Presto!	Magic	4 November 2010
Stevie conducts an experiment to determine if different foods float or sink in fizzy water. Lauren pretends to be a sultana in a glass of fizzy water. Fely becomes a chef and serves a strawberry dish with whipped cream. Lauren moves her arms like egg beaters. Tim pretends to be a nature scientist exploring in search of a musical hummingbird. Fit Bit Tips: Stevie and Tim learn how to stretch before practising karate. Casey and Chats think of a name for a magical tree which grows a variety of different fruits. Lauren dresses up as a magical tree that can dance. Sharing Stories: Lauren tells a story about three students at a magic school (Casey, Fely, and Tim) with a new teacher (Stevie) who has never taught magic before.
520	40	"Magical Me!"	Hey Presto!	Magic	5 November 2010
Stevie performs a magic routine when he links metal rings together. Lauren demonstrates the skills and talents which make her magical. Casey uses a magical wand to attempt an invisibility trick while Chats plays a trick on her. Lauren imagines using a magical umbrella which makes her invisible. Tim pretends to be a Viking named Thor preparing to travel to a new land across the ocean. Fit Bit Tips: Stevie and Tim learn how to paddle a kayak. Fely works as a florist and uses magic to change the colour of her flower bunches. Lauren dresses up as a magical jellybean that can change colours. Sharing Stories: Casey tells a story about a fairy (Tim) who is waiting to get his wings, and seeks the help of his friends (Fely, Lauren, and Stevie) for ideas to help them grow faster.
521	41	"Party"	Turn the Music Up!	Surprise	8 November 2010
Stevie designs a costume for Chats to wear to her surprise party. Lauren pretends to be a sunflower waking up for the day. Fely gets a surprise when her grocery delivery arrives full of party food and decorations. Lauren sings a surprising birthday greeting. Tim plays a baby grand piano for a performance at a party. Fit Bit Tips: Stevie and Tim learn how to play beach volleyball. Casey and Chats fill in the missing words of a greeting card. Lauren practises using her hands to communicate a special message to a friend. Sharing Stories: Chats tells a story about a Hi-5 party which results in a mix-up when Tim, Fely, Lauren, Stevie, and Casey each believe that the party will be held somewhere different.
522	42	"Surprise Visitors"	Turn the Music Up!	Surprise	9 November 2010
Fely is visited by a garden gnome and makes a home for it by a pond. Lauren pretends to be a gnome going fishing for a sparkly fish. Casey and Chats hear a mysterious sound and try to figure out where it is coming from. Lauren conducts a symphony of rubber ducks. Caveman Tim surprises his friends with a song played on his new musical instruments. Fit Bit Tips: Stevie and Tim learn how to ride a bicycle. Stevie explores shapes while making sandwiches for a surprise Hi-5 lunch. Lauren practises moving while balancing a plate of fruit. Sharing Stories: Stevie tells a story about a young dinosaur (Tim) who prepares for the arrival of his new baby sibling (Casey), while his mother (Lauren) and their doctor (Fely) get ready for the baby's egg to hatch.
523	43	"What's Inside?"	Turn the Music Up!	Surprise	10 November 2010
Stevie uses keys of different shapes to open mystery boxes and discover what's inside. Lauren becomes a bug-in-the-box. Fely prepares a fruit platter, using fruit with surprising shapes and colours inside. Lauren pretends to be a little red dragon searching for red dragonfruit. Tim the detective fox uses his sharp hearing to decipher which animals are making different sounds. Fit Bit Tips: Stevie and Tim learn how to go trotting when riding a horse. Casey and Chats test out a mind-reading toaster invention by thinking of letters to be guessed. Chef Lauren serves breakfast, with a selection of eggs cooked in different ways. Sharing Stories: Chats tells a story about a Hi-5 party which results in a mix-up when Tim, Fely, Lauren, Stevie, and Casey each believe that the party will be held somewhere different.
524	44	"Babies - Something New"	Turn the Music Up!	Surprise	11 November 2010
Stevie the animal rescuer finds new pouches for three baby marsupials. Lauren cuddles with a baby joey in a pretend pouch. Casey plays with a new baby doll, which Chats pretends to be the voice of. Lauren pretends to be a rocking baby and a twisting toddler. Farmer Tim plays banjo music for the newborn baby animals on the farm, and helps them find their own special sounds. Fit Bit Tips: Stevie and Tim learn how to kick a soccer ball. Fely dresses identical twin baby dolls in different colours, before Jup Jup adds another baby to the group. Lauren and Casey pretend to be twins. Sharing Stories: Stevie tells a story about a young dinosaur (Tim) who prepares for the arrival of his new baby sibling (Casey), while his mother (Lauren) and their doctor (Fely) get ready for the baby's egg to hatch.
525	45	"Treasures"	Turn the Music Up!	Surprise	12 November 2010
Casey and Chats use a sound detector to find treasures beginning with different letter sounds. Lauren thinks of ways to move that start with B, S, and T. Stevie harvests the crops in his garden, and tries to work out which vegetables are growing. Lauren plants watermelon seeds in the garden. Captain Tim and his pirate crew sing a sea shanty while digging for treasure. Fit Bit Tips: Stevie and Tim learn how to play mini-golf. Fely makes necklaces for Casey and Lauren, each with a different pattern of beads. Lauren practises a surprise cheer for the Hi-5 team. Sharing Stories: Chats tells a story about a Hi-5 party which results in a mix-up when Tim, Fely, Lauren, Stevie, and Casey each believe that the party will be held somewhere different.

== Home video releases ==
=== Compilation releases ===
Series	DVD Title	Release date (Region 4)	Songs of the Week	Ref.
12	Imagine That	DVD: 7 October 2010	Martian Groove; Hi-5 Farm; Stand Up Tall on Tippy Toes	
12	Happy Hi-5 House	DVD: 6 January 2011	Happy House; Toy Box; Backyard Adventurers	
12	Hey Presto	DVD: 3 March 2011	Hey Presto!; The Dancing Bus; Turn the Music Up!	
12	Sharing Stories 2	DVD: 2 June 2011	Turn the Music Up!; Hi-5 Farm; Toy Box; Hey Presto!; Stand Up Tall on Tippy Toes; Backyard Adventurers; Martian Groove; Happy House; The Dancing Bus	

=== Full episode releases ===
Series	DVD Title	Release date (Region 4)	Songs of the Week	Episodes	Ref.
12	Fun & Games	DVD: 5 September 2012	The Dancing Bus; Happy House; Toy Box	"Summer Holiday" (Series 12, Episode 22); "Backyard Games" (Series 12, Episode 18); "Games" (Series 12, Episode 28)	
12	Animal Fun	DVD: 19 June 2013	Hi-5 Farm; Martian Groove; Turn the Music Up!	"Jungle Adventure" (Series 12, Episode 3); "In Nature" (Series 12, Episode 12); "Babies - Something New" (Series 12, Episode 44)	

== Awards and nominations ==
List of awards and nominations received by Hi-5 series 12
Award	Year	Recipient(s) and nominee(s)	Category	Result	Ref.
Logie Awards	2011	Hi-5	Most Outstanding Children's Program	Nominated	
