= Hi-5 Philippines =

- Genre: Children's, edutainment
- Created by: Helena Harris; Posie Graeme-Evans
- Based on: Hi-5
- Written by: Elmer Gatchalian
- Directed by: Mark Meily
- Starring: Aira Biñas; Fred Lo; Gerard Pagunsan; Alex Reyes; Rissey Reyes
- Voices of: Priscilla Rose Nalundasan
- Theme music composer: Chris Harriott
- Opening theme: "Hi-5 Theme" (sung in Filipino)
- Ending theme: "Hi-5 Theme" (Reprise)
- Country of origin: Philippines
- Original languages: Filipino; English (secondary language)
- No. of seasons: 2
- No. of episodes: 90

Production
- Executive producers: Rose Camia; Tessa Mangahas
- Production locations: TV5 Media Center Reliance, Mandaluyong
- Editor: Raymond Pangilinan
- Running time: 30 minutes
- Production companies: Hi-5 Operations Pte Ltd. Tremendous Entertainment Group; Endemol Shine Group (original series)

Original release
- Network: TV5
- Release: June 15, 2015 – April 29, 2016

Related
- Hi-5; Hi-5 House

Hi-5 Philippines is the Filipino version of the Australian children's edutainment series of the same title as the first franchise in Asia. Hi-5 Philippines had its first season aired on TV5 from June 15 to August 14, 2015 and second season aired from February 22 to April 29, 2016. The series mostly adapted the original version's Season 11-13.

On May 2, 2016, episodes of the second season aired in reruns and from January 9 to September 1, 2017, the second season reran in shortened format featuring only the first two segments of each episode due to time constrains (when newer shows began to air).

The contract was approved by TV5 and Hi-5 Operations Pte. Ltd.

== Background ==
Launched in Australia in 1999, Hi-5 rapidly grew in popularity over the years. It has won three Logie Awards for Most Outstanding Children's Program, five ARIA Awards for Best Children's Album and five Australian DVD and Video Industry Awards, among other achievements. It was then that Hi-5 started expanding its reach by franchising the show across North America, Europe, Australasia, Latin America, and Asia. However, this is the first time that the Hi-5 franchise assembled an entirely new cast for the localization of the show in Asia. The Filipino version of the musical group is currently one of the only two casts for Hi-5, the other one being the Australian cast.

== Cast ==
- Aira Biñas - Word Play
- Fred Lo - Shapes in Space
- Gerard Pagunsan - Making Music
- Alex Reyes - Puzzles and Patterns
- Rissey Reyes - Body Move

== Songs of the Week ==
=== Season 1 (2015) ===
- Five Senses (June 15–19)
- Robot Number 1 (June 22–26)
- L.O.V.E. (June 29–July 3)
- Planet Earth (July 6–10)
- WOW! (July 13–17)
- Living In A Fairytale 0(July 20–24)
- Making Music (July 27–31)
- The Dancing Bus (August 3–7)
- Underwater Discovery (August 10–14)

=== Season 2 (2016) ===
- Toy Box (February 22–26)
- Hi-5 Farm (February 29–March 4)
- Wish Upon A Star (March 7–11)
- Happy Monster Dance (March 14–18)
- Some Kind Of Wonderful (March 28–April 1)
- Happy House (April 4–8)
- Knock, Knock, Knock (April 11–15)
- Stand Up Tall On Tippy Toes (April 18–22)
- Let's Get Away (April 25–29)

== Awards ==
Year	Award	Category	Recipient(s)	Result	Ref.
2015	29th PMPC Star Awards for Television	Best Children Show Host	Aira Biñas, Gerard Pagunsan, Rissey Reyes, Alex Reyes, and Fred Lo	Nominated	
2016	Anak TV Seal Awards	Anak TV Seal (Household Favorite Program)	Hi-5 Philippines	Won	

== See also ==
- List of TV5 (Philippine TV network) original programming
