= Tanika =

Tanika is a given name. Notable people with the given name include:

- Tanika Anderson, Australian actress and performer
- Tanika Charles, Canadian soul and R&B singer
- Tanika Gupta (born 1963), British playwright
- Tanika Liburd (born 1982), Saint Kitts and Nevis athlete
- Tanika Ray (born 1972), American entertainment reporter
- Tanika Sarkar, Indian historian
