= List of Hi-5 House episodes =

Hi-5 House is an Australian children's television series, a spin-off of the original Hi-5 series, which aired on the Nine Network in Australia from 1999 to 2011, created by Helena Harris and Posie Graeme-Evans. The series stars the children's musical group Hi-5, with the spin-off being created to continue the concept with a refreshed appeal, after the brand was sold by the Nine Network in 2012. The program is known for its musical and educational content. Hi-5 House premiered on 4 November 2013 on Nick Jr. Australia.

The series is designed for a pre-school audience, featuring five performers who educate and entertain through music, movement and play. Music is an integral part of the series with the group's pop appeal resonating in the program. The segments of the show are based on an educational model. Julie Greene served as the executive producer for the program, having previously worked as a series producer on the original show. The cast is composed of Lauren Brant, Mary Lascaris, Ainsley Melham, Stevie Nicholson, and Dayen Zheng. Brant was replaced by Tanika Anderson for the later two series. Hi-5 House received an Asian Television Award for Best Preschool Program in 2015.

The third and final series was made available worldwide on Netflix on 25 March 2016. Hi-5 House concluded as a result of the Nine Network renewing its partnership with the Hi-5 franchise in October 2016 with plans to revive the original program with a new cast in 2017.

== Series overview ==
Series	Episodes	Originally released		
Series	Episodes	First released	Last released	Network
1	25	4 November 2013	6 December 2013	Nick Jr.
2	25	6 October 2014	7 November 2014	Nick Jr.
3	25	25 March 2016		Netflix

== Episodes ==
=== Series 1 (2013) ===
No. overall	No. in series	Title	Song of the Week	Theme	Original release date	Australian viewers
1	1	"Explore My Space"	Come On In	Home	4 November 2013	47,000
Stevie uses his new building blocks to make different things and transform into different people. Mary performs a new cheer for the Hi-5 house. Lauren and Chats decorate the bedroom with their special belongings while unpacking. Ainsley writes a song about his friends, incorporating all of their favourite things. Dayen prepares party packs for Hi-5, to celebrate their new home. Mary travels around the house by moving in different ways. Sharing Stories: Lauren tells a story about a girl (Mary) and her father (Ainsley), who move into a magical caravan, which takes them to the homes of a seal (Dayen) and a monkey (Stevie).
2	2	"Things I Love at Home"	Come On In	Home	5 November 2013	N/A
Lauren and Chats explore alliteration while accessorising their room with furry fabrics. Mary pretends to be a friendly fox digging a burrow in the ground. Stevie becomes a jack-in-the-box while unpacking boxes in the new house. Ainsley plays different flutes and whistles, and discovers a high pitched whistle that only dogs can hear. Dayen searches around her space to find a collection of her treasures that Jup Jup has hidden. Mary gives her body a workout in the kitchen while baking an imaginary cake. The Chatterbox: Chats and the bookworms meet Tinka, a tin toy robot who cannot speak English, and teach her how to introduce herself.
3	3	"Where I Come From"	Come On In	Home	6 November 2013	N/A
Lauren teaches Chats the idiom "piece of cake" when she receives a postcard from her grandmother. Mary tries to juggle, a task which is "easy as pie" for her. Stevie explores the flags of the different countries the group come from, and makes a flag for the Hi-5 house using special symbols. Ainsley plays a bağlama from Greece and an oud from Lebanon, instruments which transport him and Mary to the places where they originated. Dayen writes her name in Korean, where her family comes from. Mary spells her name using her body to make the letter shapes. Sharing Stories: Lauren tells a story about a girl (Mary) and her father (Ainsley), who move into a magical caravan, which takes them to the homes of a seal (Dayen) and a monkey (Stevie).
4	4	"Inside / Outside"	Come On In	Home	7 November 2013	N/A
Lauren watches Chats's television news report to see if the weather is suitable for flying a kite outside. Mary moves like a leaf being blown around by the wind. Dayen collects flowers from the garden and finds a way of transferring the rainwater inside to pour it in a vase. Ainsley makes some outdoor music by stomping on trays of leaves, sticks, and other items collected from the garden. Stevie becomes a backyard investigator when he tries to discover who left a trail of footprints outside. Mary stretches in the garden while standing like a tall gum tree. The Chatterbox: Chats and the bookworms meet Tinka, a tin toy robot who cannot speak English, and teach her how to introduce herself.
5	5	"Pets at Home"	Come On In	Home	8 November 2013	N/A
Lauren and Chats try to think of the perfect name for a potential pet kitten. Mary pretends to be a cat boxing with a ball of wool. Stevie tests out his new pet doors of different shapes, which allow his dog to easily exit and enter the house. Ainsley attracts the attention of the neighbourhood pets with his tap dancing, and decides to include their sounds in a song. Dayen wonders what it would be like to have a chicken as a pet, while cooking eggs for breakfast. Mary pets a baby chicken. Sharing Stories: Lauren tells a story about a girl (Mary) and her father (Ainsley), who move into a magical caravan, which takes them to the homes of a seal (Dayen) and a monkey (Stevie).
6	6	"Move Your Body"	Move Your Body	Healthy, Active	11 November 2013	N/A
Lauren imagines doing aerobic exercises in outer space, with Chats as her "astro-aerobics" instructor. Mary does a morning stretching routine to welcome the sun. Stevie becomes a limbo dancer who undertakes the challenge of moving his limber body underneath the limbo stick. Mary performs a dance with maracas. Ainsley does some gymnastic exercises while singing, which help him give his voice a workout. Dayen prepares to make some gentle gypsy music before Jup Jup switches her instruments with items for a more energetic style. Sharing Stories: Dayen tells a story about a fast young leopard (Lauren) who is warned by her parents (Mary and Ainsley) to slow down, before she outruns her spots while running through the savannah with a springbok friend (Stevie).
7	7	"Sports and Games"	Move Your Body	Healthy, Active	12 November 2013	49,000
Stevie goes for a surf at the beach and meets a dolphin swimming in the waves. Lauren and Chats play I spy while moving around the room in physical ways. Mary tries to control her laughter during a stretching workout. Ainsley plays ping pong with the rest of Hi-5, by making the sound of the ball with different instruments. Dayen practises a magic trick with three upside down cups and a ball hiding inside. Mary puts on hats used for different sports and performs the action related to each hat. The Chatterbox: Chats mistakes Tinka's wind-up key for a pair of fairy wings while dressing up, causing Tinka to power down when they swap attachments.
8	8	"Food"	Move Your Body	Healthy, Active	13 November 2013	N/A
Stevie tries to think of a way to carry curvy and round fruits to the Hi-5 picnic. Mary pieces together a jigsaw puzzle of an apple. Ainsley makes a Mexican guacamole dip while making music with the vegetable ingredients. Mary tap dances while wearing a carrot costume. Lauren challenges Chats to guess the surprise ingredient she used to make a smoothie. Dayen finds a way to serve her berry muffins equally among the rest of Hi-5, when some of her food goes missing. Sharing Stories: Dayen tells a story about a fast young leopard (Lauren) who is warned by her parents (Mary and Ainsley) to slow down, before she outruns her spots while running through the savannah with a springbok friend (Stevie).
9	9	"Feeling Good"	Move Your Body	Healthy, Active	14 November 2013	N/A
Lauren shows Chats a kaleidoscope on a rainy day, with a rainbow of colourful patterns inside. Mary looks at different colours and moves in the way they each make her feel. Dayen the animal doctor helps her patients feel brave by having them imagine things that make them happy. Ainsley pretends to be a turtle who searches the beach for new ways to make drumming sounds. Stevie invents a "mood-ometer" which displays the particular emotions he may be feeling. Mary adds a goofy face to the mood-ometer and acts out feeling silly. The Chatterbox: Chats mistakes Tinka's wind-up key for a pair of fairy wings while dressing up, causing Tinka to power down when they swap attachments.
10	10	"Learn Something New!"	Move Your Body	Healthy, Active	15 November 2013	N/A
Lauren works as a chef at a restaurant and prepares a healthy salad lunch for Chats. Mary serves drinks to a group of teddy bears dining at a café. Ainsley practises playing the drums and imagines being a rock and roll drummer performing at a concert. Stevie runs a jungle gym for animals, to help them become fit and strong enough to return to the wild. Dayen sets up a stall of fruits and flowers to sell at a farmer's market, while Jup Jup helps her think of a new way to prepare the fruits. Mary pretends to be a baby bumblebee learning how to fly. Sharing Stories: Dayen tells a story about a fast young leopard (Lauren) who is warned by her parents (Mary and Ainsley) to slow down, before she outruns her spots while running through the savannah with a springbok friend (Stevie).
11	11	"Magic and Fantasy"	Reach Out	Dreaming	18 November 2013	N/A
Stevie dresses up as a genie and searches for treasures of different shapes inside a cave. Dayen tries to recreate the image of a magical creature that she remembers from her dreams. Mary pretends to be a colourful fairy flying over a rainbow. Ainsley plays soft music in the hope of meeting a fairy, but accidentally summons a troll instead. Lauren pretends to be a baby dragon, while Chats acts as the dragon trainer. Mary performs a dance with a Chinese dragon puppet. Sharing Stories: Mary tells a story about a girl (Dayen) who dreams of climbing a mountain made of ice cream to collect the cherry at the summit, meeting a variety of fantastical creatures (Stevie, Ainsley, and Lauren) along the way.
12	12	"Dream Catcher"	Reach Out	Dreaming	19 November 2013	N/A
Lauren and Chats imagine climbing Chomolungma and reaching the summit of the mountain. Mary moves like a dreamcatcher collecting dreams and wishes. Stevie relaxes in a teepee and imagines visiting a land full of other triangle shapes. Dayen hangs a dreamcatcher and fantasises about becoming a tennis player, followed by a painter. Mary blows bubbles and tries to pop them by moving in different ways. Ainsley hosts a sleepover party with the rest of Hi-5 and tries to find a musical way to send his friends to sleep. The Chatterbox: Chats and the bookworms teach Tinka about dreams by helping her to picture herself floating on a cloud.
13	13	"If I Could Be Anything"	Reach Out	Dreaming	20 November 2013	N/A
Ainsley plans on building a new room for the cubby house, but is distracted by making tapping music with his work boots and tools. Mary performs a tap dancing routine. Lauren combines her fantasy of being a painter with Chats's dream of cave exploring, for an imaginary adventure together. Dayen runs a pretend job agency and finds new careers for a group of teddy bears. Mary pretends to be an astronaut and imagines flying through space in a rocket. Stevie wonders what it would be like to be a spider and spin a spider web. Sharing Stories: Mary tells a story about a girl (Dayen) who dreams of climbing a mountain made of ice cream to collect the cherry at the summit, meeting a variety of fantastical creatures (Stevie, Ainsley, and Lauren) along the way.
14	14	"Dream Holiday"	Reach Out	Dreaming	21 November 2013	N/A
Lauren shows Chats how her bed can be a special place, when it becomes the means for an imaginary journey to Egypt. Mary dresses up as a pharaoh queen for an Egyptian dance. Dayen uses her imagination to transform two chairs into equipment for an adventure holiday. Ainsley dreams of visiting a pretend planet with talking glockenspiel keys, who teach him a song to help him return home. Stevie plans a camping trip to the Grand Canyon, and tries to encourage his stubborn donkey to move along with him. Mary pretends to be a camel travelling across the desert. The Chatterbox: Chats and the bookworms teach Tinka about dreams by helping her to picture herself floating on a cloud.
15	15	"Sweet Dreams"	Reach Out	Dreaming	22 November 2013	N/A
Lauren listens to Chats's bedtime story and prepares a sweet treat before going to bed. Mary demonstrates her daily bedtime routine. Stevie works as a dream scientist and uses a machine to help Lauren make a wish come true. Dayen becomes a detective to investigate the mystery of Hi-5's missing bedtime items. Mary dresses up as a sheep for a dance. Ainsley fantasises about being a jazz singer performing a dreamy song. Sharing Stories: Mary tells a story about a girl (Dayen) who dreams of climbing a mountain made of ice cream to collect the cherry at the summit, meeting a variety of fantastical creatures (Stevie, Ainsley, and Lauren) along the way.
16	16	"Australian Animals"	So Many Animals	Animals	25 November 2013	N/A
Stevie competes with his emu in a race around an Australian outback obstacle course. Mary pretends to be a brolga dancing gracefully in the wetlands. Dayen coordinates a mixed-up Australian animal costume to wear to a fancy dress party. Ainsley pretends to be a cicada searching for a new percussion sound to replace his click. Lauren dresses up as animals from the outback while Chats acts as the tour guide describing them. Mary hops like a tree frog and a wallaby. Sharing Stories: Ainsley tells a story about three elephants (Lauren, Dayen, and Mary) in the savannah who encourage their friend (Stevie) to join them for a mud bath when he refuses to get dirty.
17	17	"Caring for Animals"	So Many Animals	Animals	26 November 2013	N/A
Lauren pretends to be a zookeeper and feeds the animals that Chats dresses up as. Mary feeds a group of pretend animals at the zoo. Stevie looks after a pet mouse and imagines being a mouse playing in a cage himself. Ainsley pretends to be a farmer playing a fiddle in different ways to imitate the sounds of his barnyard animals. Dayen runs a home for lost pets and prepares beds for three different sized animals. Mary pretends to be a tiger dancing the tango. The Chatterbox: Chats, Tinka, and the bookworms look after a pet goldfish and imagine becoming fish to best understand how to care for it.
18	18	"Animal Kingdoms"	So Many Animals	Animals	27 November 2013	N/A
Stevie dresses up as a lion and builds a den to rest inside. Lauren tries to interpret Chats's chatters and howls while she is pretending to be a monkey. Mary moves around like a cheeky monkey in a tree. Ainsley pretends to be a butterfly leading two caterpillars through the process of metamorphosis. Mary does a jitterbug dance while dressed up as a bug. Dayen sorts out a collection of animal pictures according to their habitats: on land or in the sea. Sharing Stories: Ainsley tells a story about three elephants (Lauren, Dayen, and Mary) in the savannah who encourage their friend (Stevie) to join them for a mud bath when he refuses to get dirty.
19	19	"Underwater"	So Many Animals	Animals	28 November 2013	N/A
Lauren imagines being Queen Neptuna, who helps Chats communicate with the ocean animals by replicating their calls. Mary, Queen Neptuna, goes for an underwater ride on a seahorse. Stevie pretends to be an octopus who uses his tentacles to identify different sea objects through touch. Dayen explores the imaginary Long Sock Bay in search of a rare and mythical "socktopus" creature. Mary pretends to be a bubble fish. Ainsley goes surfing and meets some singing fish, who help him move in harmony with the ocean. The Chatterbox: Chats, Tinka, and the bookworms look after a pet goldfish and imagine becoming fish to best understand how to care for it.
20	20	"Wild Animals"	So Many Animals	Animals	29 November 2013	N/A
Lauren and Chats read a book about wild animals and explore the abbreviations of long animal names. Mary dresses up as a hippo for a hopping dance. Dayen imagines going on safari in a jeep in search of different jungle animals. Stevie pretends to be a bear who decorates his cave lair with bright colours on the first day of spring. Mary tries to take a photograph of a brown bear in the forest. Ainsley acts as a tiger and sings the parts of a duet by himself, before he is joined by another tiger. Sharing Stories: Ainsley tells a story about three elephants (Lauren, Dayen, and Mary) in the savannah who encourage their friend (Stevie) to join them for a mud bath when he refuses to get dirty.
21	21	"Brave and Strong"	Dance with the Dinosaurs	Adventure	2 December 2013	N/A
Stevie becomes a circus performer and practises balancing objects of different shapes at the same time. Mary performs balancing tricks using an exercise ball. Dayen prepares for a mountain climbing adventure by packing clothes appropriate for a cold climate hike. Ainsley pretends to be a brave Viking warrior who composes a powerful anthem to play on drums. Lauren practises a karate demonstration by using rhymes given by Chats to remember the combination of moves. Mary pretends to be an exercising mouse. Sharing Stories: Stevie tells a story about a young triceratops (Ainsley) with a love of dance, who reluctantly goes on an adventure to the Cycad Forest with his friends (Dayen and Lauren), where he challenges a fearsome Tyrannosaurus rex (Mary) to a dance-off.
22	22	"Super Heroes"	Dance with the Dinosaurs	Adventure	3 December 2013	N/A
Stevie builds a clubhouse for superheroes using his pretend power of super strength. Mary imagines being a superhero and flying through the sky. Lauren and Chats form a superhero partnership and use their individual powers to work together. Ainsley works at a sound clinic and uses music to treat his superhero patients. Dayen pretends to be a weightlifting champion and finds different objects to balance her weights. Mary practises running slowly after using her super speed. The Chatterbox: Chats and the bookworms talk about the super powers that they each have and teach Tinka how to say thank you, while on a camping adventure in the bush.
23	23	"Explorers"	Dance with the Dinosaurs	Adventure	4 December 2013	N/A
Dayen pretends to be a pirate and searches for treasure around the backyard. Mary makes a giant compass and practises moving in different directions. Ainsley explores the sounds of instruments from around the world, which transport him to the different countries that they come from. Mary pretends to be a cow who yodels while dancing in the mountains. Stevie pretends to be an ant scout searching for food on the ground to return to his nest. Lauren and Chats communicate via video message before adventuring to the beach. Sharing Stories: Stevie tells a story about a young triceratops (Ainsley) with a love of dance, who reluctantly goes on an adventure to the Cycad Forest with his friends (Dayen and Lauren), where he challenges a fearsome Tyrannosaurus rex (Mary) to a dance-off.
24	24	"Journeys"	Dance with the Dinosaurs	Adventure	5 December 2013	N/A
Dayen packs her bags for a weekend trip while Jup Jup helps her load the essential items. Mary tries to find a way to carry a heavy suitcase. Lauren and Chats imagine travelling across the land, sea, and ice in a hovercraft. Ainsley and Mary pretend to be mutton birds migrating to the other side of the world while singing a special song. Stevie builds a rocketship and travels to the Moon, where he discovers a Moon rock while exploring the surface. Mary pretends she is standing on the Sun, and jumps around to avoid the heat. The Chatterbox: Chats and the bookworms talk about the super powers that they each have and teach Tinka how to say thank you, while on a camping adventure in the bush.
25	25	"Make Believe"	Dance with the Dinosaurs	Adventure	6 December 2013	N/A
Ainsley imagines travelling to different lands to play and listen to a variety of musical styles. Lauren and Chats dress up in costumes and create an imaginative story about fairies and dragons. Mary uses items from her backpack to act out the movements of different adventures. Stevie pretends to be a builder constructing an ice playground for penguins in Antarctica. Dayen designs a spaceship using equipment from the kitchen and imagines journeying into outer space. Mary sings to the night stars. Sharing Stories: Stevie tells a story about a young triceratops (Ainsley) with a love of dance, who reluctantly goes on an adventure to the Cycad Forest with his friends (Dayen and Lauren), where he challenges a fearsome Tyrannosaurus rex (Mary) to a dance-off.

=== Series 2 (2014) ===
No. overall	No. in series	Title	Song of the Week	Theme	Original release date	Australian viewers
26	1	"Amazon Jungle"	It's Our Planet	Eco Champion	6 October 2014	N/A
Stevie becomes a birdwatcher, paddling through the Amazon in search of exotic birds. Mary does a workout inspired by the movements of some jungle animals. Dayen works as a ranger from an animal rescue group and sets three jungle animals back into the wild. Ainsley captures the sounds of the Amazon into jars and creates a musical soundscape with them. Tanika and Chats pretend to be a pair of toucans dancing the tango. Mary and the rest of Hi-5 present an Amazon animal acrobatics performance. Sharing Stories: Mary tells a story about three Christmas beetles (Stevie, Tanika, and Dayen) who prepare to eat lunch with their new dung beetle neighbour (Ainsley), before they learn that he eats cow manure.
27	2	"My Backyard"	It's Our Planet	Eco Champion	7 October 2014	N/A
Tanika shows Chats her worm farm, which inspires them to plant a vegetable garden together. Mary pretends to be a worm wriggling in the soil of a worm farm. Ainsley searches for the best style of music to play to help his magical sunflower seed grow. Dayen positions paving stones in a corner of the garden to create a place to sit. Mary becomes a superhero while cleaning up rubbish in the backyard. Stevie explores the garden at night to find out what has been eating his vegetable plants. The Chatterbox: Chats and the bookworms teach Tinka how to recycle when they use old greeting cards to create a collage picture of a snowman.
28	3	"Coral Reef"	It's Our Planet	Eco Champion	8 October 2014	N/A
Dayen pretends to be a mermaid, working to keep the coral reef garden tidy. Stevie the cleaner wrasse uses different sized brushes to clean ocean creatures under the sea. Mary shows how a cuttlefish can change colours to match its feelings. Tanika tries to guess the sea creatures that Chats is dressing up as, by solving her word puzzles. Mary goes for a swim on the water and practises different swimming strokes. Ainsley pretends to be a dolphin who uses his dolphin call to find a lost friend surfing out at sea. Sharing Stories: Mary tells a story about three Christmas beetles (Stevie, Tanika, and Dayen) who prepare to eat lunch with their new dung beetle neighbour (Ainsley), before they learn that he eats cow manure.
29	4	"The Poles"	It's Our Planet	Eco Champion	9 October 2014	N/A
Stevie pretends to be a polar bear and builds an igloo while beatboxing. Mary skates across a frozen lake while looking for penguins on the ice. Tanika and Chats holiday to the North Pole and observe the Arctic animals from their igloo. Ainsley leads his team of piano-playing penguins through an energetic musical rehearsal. Dayen dresses up as an Eskimo and uses stepping stones of ice to cross an Arctic river. Mary pretends to be a husky dog pulling a sleigh through the snow. The Chatterbox: Chats and the bookworms teach Tinka how to recycle when they use old greeting cards to create a collage picture of a snowman.
30	5	"Super Eco Champions"	It's Our Planet	Eco Champion	10 October 2014	N/A
Stevie imagines becoming a superhero who uses solar-powered energy to save the world. Tanika launches a new fashion line featuring designs made from recycled materials. Mary cleans up the rubbish by playing a game of bin basketball. Ainsley generates power for the Hi-5 house by cycling on a stationary bike. Dayen uses recycled materials to build a special resting place for birds in the garden. Mary grows vegetables in the garden and uses superhero strength to harvest them. Sharing Stories: Mary tells a story about three Christmas beetles (Stevie, Tanika, and Dayen) who prepare to eat lunch with their new dung beetle neighbour (Ainsley), before they learn that he eats cow manure.
31	6	"Inventions"	Starburst	Technology	13 October 2014	N/A
Stevie assembles a mystery invention from a flat-pack and tries to work out its purpose. Dayen designs a way to keep six unhatched eggs warm and safe for a mother hen. Ainsley creates some unique new musical instruments using unusual items from around the house. Mary plays with musical tappers made with thimbles from her sewing kit. Tanika tests out Chats's onomatopoeia machine, which translates sounds into words. Mary pretends to be a robot designed to rock a baby to sleep. Sharing Stories: Dayen tells a story about a family (Mary, Ainsley, and Tanika) who purchase a high-tech new vacuum cleaner (Stevie), only to find that their socks have gone missing around the house.
32	7	"World Wide Web"	Starburst	Technology	14 October 2014	N/A
Tanika pretends to be a robot who uses the internet to search for sets of rhyming words. Mary moves like a robot and dances to music downloaded from the world wide web. Stevie decorates his room with circle shapes after Dayen changes his computer's wallpaper to a spotty design. Ainsley uses his tablet to broadcast a musical keyboard performance over the internet. Dayen decides to video call her grandmother when Jup Jup meddles with her other methods of communication. Mary imagines being immersed in her favourite computer dancing program. The Chatterbox: Chats, Tinka, and the bookworms try to figure out the purpose of a mystery machine which emits colourful lights.
33	8	"Gadgets and Gizmos"	Starburst	Technology	15 October 2014	N/A
Stevie explores how pictures on a screen are made up of pixels, while playing a matching game with images and their pixel shapes. Mary uses emoticon faces to describe how she is feeling. Tanika and Chats use photographs from their day at the beach to tell a story about their experience. Ainsley uses a special electric guitar to record and play unusual sounds for a rock song. Mary wonders what it would be like if her body made silly sounds. Dayen builds a machine which uses every day items to trigger a chain reaction of movements. Sharing Stories: Dayen tells a story about a family (Mary, Ainsley, and Tanika) who purchase a high-tech new vacuum cleaner (Stevie), only to find that their socks have gone missing around the house.
34	9	"Amazing Machines"	Starburst	Technology	16 October 2014	N/A
Tanika uses Chats's mind reading machine to discover something that Chats wants her to do. Mary pretends to be a satellite dish receiving a signal from outer space. Dayen operates a bulldozer in order to clear a space for a new playground. Ainsley works at a beach ball factory and tries to repair the machine when it produces incorrect types of balls. Stevie is controlled by Tanika when he takes the form of a character inside a video game. Mary practises her programmed movements with a virtual version of herself. The Chatterbox: Chats, Tinka, and the bookworms try to figure out the purpose of a mystery machine which emits colourful lights.
35	10	"Transportation"	Starburst	Technology	17 October 2014	N/A
Stevie runs a service station and carries out maintenance work on a variety of cars. Tanika visits Chats's travel agency to choose a destination for a holiday. Mary travels around the world in a teleporter to explore different dancing styles. Ainsley works on a musical tour and drives the van to the concert venue, where he sets up the equipment and performs. Dayen crafts a pretend jetpack to transport her on an imaginary flight through space. Mary uses solar-powered energy to walk on stilts. Sharing Stories: Dayen tells a story about a family (Mary, Ainsley, and Tanika) who purchase a high-tech new vacuum cleaner (Stevie), only to find that their socks have gone missing around the house.
36	11	"Fun with Friends"	Give Five	Friends and Family	20 October 2014	N/A
Stevie crafts a conical funnel with paper and uses the horn-like instrument to form a band with his Hi-5 friends. Dayen decorates different-sized balloons with funny faces as a present for a friend. Mary performs a ballet dance while holding a balloon. Ainsley pretends to be a cattle dog who loves playing blues music on the harmonica, but feels too afraid to share his special interest with the cows. Tanika teaches Chats the collective nouns of different animal names, while choosing a theme for a dress-up party. Mary and Ainsley pretend to be two pigs trying to cross a puddle of mud. Sharing Stories: Tanika tells a story about a scorpion (Stevie) who must come up with a plan to befriend three insects (Dayen, Mary, and Ainsley), when they struggle to look past his frightening exterior.
37	12	"Making Friends"	Give Five	Friends and Family	21 October 2014	N/A
Tanika remembers how she helped Chats conquer her stage fright at their first Hi-5 concert together. Mary practises saying hello in sign language. Stevie pretends to be a large blue whale who befriends a little minnow (Dayen) while on his way to Hawaii. Ainsley meets some alien friends who visit Earth when they hear him playing his electric guitar. Dayen builds a house made of boxes for a family of Babushka dolls. Mary and Tanika perform the traditional Japanese and Indian ways of saying hello. The Chatterbox: Chats, Tinka, and the bookworms dress up in different costumes for a photograph, to represent the diversities of their friendships.
38	13	"All Kinds of Families"	Give Five	Friends and Family	22 October 2014	N/A
Dayen collates pictures of her family to give to her new baby cousin as a present. Mary dances with a cardboard cutout of herself. Tanika and Chats play a game of charades to prepare for a family game night. Ainsley pretends to be a lion hosting a family reunion, where he writes a song to represent all of the cats in the family. Mary demonstrates how her different family members move around at their picnics. Stevie becomes a chef and bakes a variety of gingerbread people collections. Sharing Stories: Tanika tells a story about a scorpion (Stevie) who must come up with a plan to befriend three insects (Dayen, Mary, and Ainsley), when they struggle to look past his frightening exterior.
39	14	"My Family Traditions"	Give Five	Friends and Family	23 October 2014	N/A
Dayen cooks a gnocchi dish using an old family recipe, before Jup Jup adds his own elements to the meal. Mary wobbles like spaghetti. Tanika pretends to be a mountain lion who stumbles upon the burrow home of a gopher (Chats). Ainsley thinks about the different styles of music that his father and grandfather played when they were younger. Stevie makes a German schultüte for his friend's first day of school. Mary and Tanika practise a traditional German leg-slapping dance. The Chatterbox: Chats, Tinka, and the bookworms dress up in different costumes for a photograph, to represent the diversities of their friendships.
40	15	"Play Dates"	Give Five	Friends and Family	24 October 2014	N/A
Tanika and Chats write a poem to invite her cousin for a play date at the zoo. Mary works as a mail carrier, delivering letters while riding on her scooter. Stevie runs a play centre for dogs and prepares supplies for his animal clients. Ainsley dresses up as a king for a session of karaoke singing with his friends. Dayen performs a puppet show with royal characters, before Jup Jup changes the story. Mary pretends to be a marionette puppet of a queen. Sharing Stories: Tanika tells a story about a scorpion (Stevie) who must come up with a plan to befriend three insects (Dayen, Mary, and Ainsley), when they struggle to look past his frightening exterior.
41	16	"Parties"	It's a Party	Celebrate	27 October 2014	N/A
Dayen prepares a special fruit smoothie for an outer space-themed party. Mary dances a jive inspired by Jupiter. Stevie dresses up in a colourful cardboard box for a costume party with a letter B theme. Ainsley attends a Hawaiian celebration and plays the ukulele beside his hula dancing friends. Mary practises walking in flippers at a pool party. Tanika tries to decode Chats's pretend stone-age language in preparation for a prehistoric party. Sharing Stories: Ainsley tells a story about three penguin chicks (Stevie, Dayen, and Mary) who plan a party to celebrate the return of their mother (Tanika) and the arrival of the south wind.
42	17	"Christmas"	It's a Party	Celebrate	28 October 2014	N/A
Stevie pretends to be an elf trying to perfect the shape of the candy canes he is making. Tanika and Chats decide to decorate themselves with unusual ornaments instead of their Christmas tree. Mary pretends to be a star coming down from the Christmas tree for a dance. Ainsley uses music to motivate the elves at Santa's workshop to pack the presents. Dayen crafts sock puppets as presents for the rest of Hi-5 when their stockings go missing. Mary pretends to be a reindeer preparing to pull Santa's sleigh. The Chatterbox: Chats, Tinka, and the bookworms follow a trail of colourful ribbons to remember a special event that they need to celebrate.
43	18	"Milestones"	It's a Party	Celebrate	29 October 2014	N/A
Ainsley pretends to be a tooth fairy trying to find a quiet way to move around while collecting teeth. Dayen makes a pizza to share with her cousin at their first sleepover together. Mary sets the dining table for a special lunch with guests. Tanika plans a surprise celebration for Chats to congratulate her on a successful season with their soccer team. Stevie completes an obstacle course used for astronauts to practise their agility, in preparation for a trip to space. Mary tries to walk across a balance beam without falling. Sharing Stories: Ainsley tells a story about three penguin chicks (Stevie, Dayen, and Mary) who plan a party to celebrate the return of their mother (Tanika) and the arrival of the south wind.
44	19	"Celebrations Around the World"	It's a Party	Celebrate	30 October 2014	N/A
Stevie becomes a party assistant who transports to different celebrations around the world with supplies. Mary performs a Brazilian Carnival dance. Tanika returns from a wedding and helps Chats pretend marry her toy dog. Ainsley plays the bagpipes and imagines visiting Scotland to accompany a traditional New Year's Eve celebration. Mary plays a Scottish drum while practising her marching. Dayen celebrates a naming ceremony at the zoo and chooses names to give to the new baby animals. The Chatterbox: Chats, Tinka, and the bookworms follow a trail of colourful ribbons to remember a special event that they need to celebrate.
45	20	"You and Me"	It's a Party	Celebrate	31 October 2014	N/A
Tanika and Chats reflect on their day at the fun park and try to remember the specific details of the visit. Mary and Dayen practise a ballet routine together and try to remember the steps. Stevie and the rest of Hi-5 work together to build a "friendship", a pretend ship which represents their friendship. Ainsley celebrates his friend's birthday by dressing up as a chicken and delivering a singing telegram. Dayen creates a photograph wall featuring pictures of her Hi-5 friends doing their favourite things. Mary poses for photographs to send to her grandmother. Sharing Stories: Ainsley tells a story about three penguin chicks (Stevie, Dayen, and Mary) who plan a party to celebrate the return of their mother (Tanika) and the arrival of the south wind.
46	21	"Playing Games"	Playtime	Playtime	3 November 2014	N/A
Ainsley plays a copycat game on his bongo drums, with Tanika and Dayen replicating his rhythms. Mary sneaks around like a rat while wearing tap shoes on her feet. Tanika hides a scone somewhere around the room and challenges Chats to guess where it is. Stevie hosts a game show called "What's That Action?", in which contestants Tanika and Ainsley must guess and perform physical movements. Mary pretends to be a horse jumping over hurdles in an obstacle course. Dayen invents a jumping game to play outdoors with a skipping rope. Sharing Stories: Stevie tells a story about three teddy bears (Mary, Dayen, and Ainsley) who go on an imaginary indoor pirate adventure in search of a special treasure, which they find with their mother (Tanika).
47	22	"Dress Ups"	Playtime	Playtime	4 November 2014	N/A
Stevie imagines becoming a washing genie who can magically fold his clothes while doing the laundry. Dayen decides to dress up as a black and white animal and tries on a variety of costumes. Mary dresses up as a zebra for an energetic dance. Ainsley dresses up as a toucan to conduct his toucan orchestra for a piece of waltz music. Tanika asks Chats the talking toadstool to grant her a wish and magically turn her into an energetic fairy. Mary pretends to be a fairy sprinkling magic dust. The Chatterbox: Chats and the bookworms teach Tinka how to count to ten when the group play a game of hide and seek together.
48	23	"Silly is Good"	Playtime	Playtime	5 November 2014	36,000
Dayen visits the farm, where Jup Jup causes the animals to make mixed-up sounds. Mary pretends to be a chicken rehearsing for a barn dance. Stevie prepares for boxing training with Ainsley, but misinterprets the idea and dresses up in boxes. Tanika and Chats add fruits and vegetables to their hats and think of names to describe their silly designs. Ainsley invents a new musical instrument which makes a variety of silly sounds. Mary performs a song with silly sounds and unusual movements to match them. Sharing Stories: Stevie tells a story about three teddy bears (Mary, Dayen, and Ainsley) who go on an imaginary indoor pirate adventure in search of a special treasure, which they find with their mother (Tanika).
49	24	"Puzzles"	Playtime	Playtime	6 November 2014	N/A
Tanika and Chats make up a series of riddles to share and solve with each other. Mary pretends to be a frog on a lily pad who has the hiccups. Ainsley challenges himself to craft new musical instruments using a variety of recycled materials. Dayen builds a miniature track for a model train and solves the puzzle of making the track larger. Mary uses her body to form a tunnel over tracks for a train to travel through. Stevie builds two-dimensional sculptures using different items from around the house. The Chatterbox: Chats and the bookworms teach Tinka how to count to ten when the group play a game of hide and seek together.
50	25	"Imaginary Friends and Places"	Playtime	Playtime	7 November 2014	N/A
Stevie becomes a warrior who must find a way to travel to the Egyptian pyramids when his horse abandons the chariot. Mary makes a paper card in the shape of a love heart for her mother's birthday. Dayen imagines visiting a land full of flowers, where she discovers some unusual plants and creatures. Mary pretends to be a spiky echidna trying to keep a balloon up in the air. Ainsley sings a duet with an imaginary double of himself. Tanika pretends to be a frog from Jamaica who befriends Chats. Sharing Stories: Stevie tells a story about three teddy bears (Mary, Dayen, and Ainsley) who go on an imaginary indoor pirate adventure in search of a special treasure, which they find with their mother (Tanika).

=== Series 3 (2016) ===
No. overall	No. in series	Title	Song of the Week	Theme	Original release date
51	1	"Animal Homes"	Animal Dance	Amazing Nature	25 March 2016
Stevie pretends to be an anglerfish searching for a new place to live under the sea. Mary pretends to be a pond skater sliding across the surface of water. Ainsley the Cuban bee prepares to relax in the hive, but is interrupted by his energetic bee friends. Tanika teaches Chats about the names of different animal homes when she leaves their bedroom looking like a pigsty. Dayen makes a model of a waterhole for wild animals in Africa to visit. Mary combines the movements of different wild animals to create swamp-themed dance. Sharing Stories: Ainsley tells a story about a hummingbird (Dayen) who builds herself a nest, which soon becomes crowded after some new friends (Tanika, Mary, and Stevie) come to visit.
52	2	"Flower Garden"	Animal Dance	Amazing Nature	25 March 2016
Tanika and Chats plant a gumboot garden, using old gumboots as pot plants. Mary pretends to be a tulip bulb in the garden, growing in the sunlight. Stevie turns the backyard into a zen garden, as a place to relax after his taekwondo training. Dayen makes a pretend ladybird for the flower garden, before Jup Jup helps her transform her creation into a magical toadstool. Mary pretends to be a fairy flying around a ring of flowers in the garden. Ainsley helps the rest of Hi-5 to find the right sounds to match their insect costumes for a garden party. The Chatterbox: After Chats and the bookworms teach Tinka about farm animals, the friends imagine visiting a real farm to find a missing cow.
53	3	"Weather"	Animal Dance	Amazing Nature	25 March 2016
Dayen works as a weather reporter and dresses up for a day full of varying weather conditions. Ainsley plays some reggae music from Jamaica, where the weather is warm and sunny. Mary dances to reggae music with relaxed movements. Tanika teaches Chats words that can be used to describe the weather on a hot and sunny day. Stevie looks for clouds while flying in a plane, and discovers how different clouds can show the weather. Sharing Stories: Ainsley tells a story about a hummingbird (Dayen) who builds herself a nest, which soon becomes crowded after some new friends (Tanika, Mary, and Stevie) come to visit.
54	4	"Wonders of the World"	Animal Dance	Amazing Nature	25 March 2016
Tanika and Chats imagine floating down the Amazon River on Victoria amazonica; a giant water lily. Mary pretends to be a frog on a lily pad who has the hiccups. Stevie builds a natural wonder park inspired by the mountains, rainbow and waterfall that he saw on a visit to a national park. Ainsley visits a canyon, where he discovers that his voice creates an echo when it is reflected against the rock walls. Dayen collects some rocks and shells at the beach, while Jup Jup helps her to create a display with her collections. Mary tries to balance while walking across wobbly rocks at the beach. The Chatterbox: After Chats and the bookworms teach Tinka about farm animals, the friends imagine visiting a real farm to find a missing cow.
55	5	"Stars and Space"	Animal Dance	Amazing Nature	25 March 2016
Stevie becomes a space explorer and fixes the solar panel on his spaceship while finding shapes in the stars. Mary pretends to be an alien creature walking on the Moon. Dayen makes a purple milkshake for a space party, before Jup Jup changes the colour of the shake. Mary pretends to be a dancing Martian. Tanika reads Chats a book about the Solar System, and teaches her the names of the planets. Ainsley visits Jupiter and sings jazz with some alien musicians. Sharing Stories: Ainsley tells a story about a hummingbird (Dayen) who builds herself a nest, which soon becomes crowded after some new friends (Tanika, Mary, and Stevie) come to visit.
56	6	"Superheroes - Special Powers"	Action Hero	Superheroes	25 March 2016
Stevie uses his super movement powers to find and locate his missing collection of shapes. Mary pretends to be a superhero practising her actions. Tanika visits Chats's supermarket for superheroes, to find an updated costume. Ainsley finds some suitable sound effects to match his heroic movements. Mary stretches her body to become taller and smaller. Dayen uses items from around the kitchen to design a new superhero costume. Sharing Stories: Dayen tells a story about a medieval hero named Sir Buckethead (Stevie) who tries to assist a girl (Tanika) on her journey to school, but is overshadowed by two more up-to-date heroes (Mary and Ainsley).
57	7	"Local Heroes - Community"	Action Hero	Superheroes	25 March 2016
Tanika and Chats explore words and phrases that rhyme while collecting rubbish in the park. Mary moves like a firefighter performing an emergency response drill. Stevie pretends to be a tugboat guiding a large ship (Ainsley) as it navigate around the harbour. Dayen works as a librarian and finds books for the rest of Hi-5 based on their interests. Ainsley helps different animals to safely cross the road, while finding musical instruments to match the way they move. Mary nurses sick koalas back to health so they can return to the wild. The Chatterbox: Chats, Tinka, and Horace become superheroes when Ari goes missing, and imagine visiting space to search for their friend.
58	8	"Super Food"	Action Hero	Superheroes	25 March 2016
Stevie dresses up as kale for a super parade featuring different vegetables. Tanika and Chats design a menu of healthy meals from around the world to serve at their café. Ainsley writes musical jingles about an avocado, a coconut, and blueberries. Mary makes energy balls and rolls them in a coconut coating. Dayen fills her backpack with bananas as a healthy snack to take along on a bushwalk. Mary pretends to be monkey full of energy from eating a banana. Sharing Stories: Dayen tells a story about a medieval hero named Sir Buckethead (Stevie) who tries to assist a girl (Tanika) on her journey to school, but is overshadowed by two more up to date heroes (Mary and Ainsley).
59	9	"Super Animals"	Action Hero	Superheroes	25 March 2016
Dayen pretends to be a frog practising her jumping for a special competition. Mary practises her frog kick technique while swimming in a pond. Stevie becomes an elephant who uses his super strength to build a shelter for three baby elephants. Mary dances like a heavy elephant performing hip hop moves. Tanika and Chats explore how flying fish and flying frogs use their bodies to glide. Ainsley dresses up as a click beetle and forms a band with other beetles that make musical sounds. The Chatterbox: Chats, Tinka, and Horace become superheroes when Ari goes missing, and imagine visiting space to search for their friend.
60	10	"My Heroes"	Action Hero	Superheroes	25 March 2016
Tanika helps Chats to write down the traits of her special friend who she sees as a hero. Mary demonstrates how her facial expressions can show her different emotions. Stevie dresses up in the colours of his favourite football team in preparation for watching a match with his father. Ainsley imagines dancing like Fred Astaire, his hero from old black and white films. Dayen prepares for lunch with her mother and counts the items in the process. Mary and Dayen count their movements while they dance. Sharing Stories: Dayen tells a story about a medieval hero named Sir Buckethead (Stevie) who tries to assist a girl (Tanika) on her journey to school, but is overshadowed by two more up to date heroes (Mary and Ainsley).
61	11	"Daring"	The Best Things in Life Are Free	Be Free	25 March 2016
Tanika and Chats visit the swap shop to replace their old gardening clothes with something new. Mary tries on gloves which help her to imagine performing different jobs. Dayen tries to be brave when getting ready for bed, by counting her fears away. Ainsley climbs a mountain and uses musical signals to inform Stevie of his location. Stevie pretends to be a show pony rehearsing his daring show tricks. Mary becomes a daring motorcycle rider and practises her moves on the track. Sharing Stories: Tanika tells a story about a rich queen (Mary) who asks her servants (Dayen and Ainsley) to buy something new and exciting for her, but ultimately finds happiness in the laughter that the court jester (Stevie) provides.
62	12	"Trying New Things"	The Best Things in Life Are Free	Be Free	25 March 2016
Tanika and Chats decide to change their appearance and explore different colour options for their hair. Mary uses imaginary scissors to cut and style the hair of a woolly mammoth. Dayen dresses up in a tomato costume to make a salad sandwich for lunch. Ainsley pretends to be a crow who teaches his friends how to sing in an operatic style. Stevie recalls his first day of kindergarten and the song he sang to introduce himself to his classmates. Mary reenacts how she would move around during lunchtime at kindergarten. The Chatterbox: Chats and the bookworms teach Tinka how to pronounce "banana" and help her to practise saying the new word.
63	13	"Making Your Own Fun"	The Best Things in Life Are Free	Be Free	25 March 2016
Stevie imagines living in a world completely made up of recycled paper and cardboard. Mary pretends to be a doll being dressed with paper clothes. Dayen composes a musical pattern with kitchen utensils while washing up the dishes. Ainsley makes sound effects using a microphone to accompany an imaginary adventure story. Mary plays with an inflatable beach ball. Tanika and Chats complete a crossword puzzle by miming the words. Sharing Stories: Tanika tells a story about a rich queen (Mary) who asks her servants (Dayen and Ainsley) to buy something new and exciting for her, but ultimately finds happiness in the laughter that the court jester (Stevie) provides.
64	14	"Things to Do"	The Best Things in Life Are Free	Be Free	25 March 2016
Stevie pretends to be a knight who decides to change his appearance with updated clothing and armour. Mary imagines being a court jester who entertains royalty with a song and dance performance. Tanika cleans the bedroom and follows a series of messages written on paper planes, which Chats has left throughout the room. Ainsley tidies up the shed and finds a variety of garden tools and equipment to make music with. Dayen tries to find a way to catch a stream of rain as it leaks through the roof at an increasing pace. Mary cleans an imaginary window. The Chatterbox: Chats and the bookworms teach Tinka how to pronounce "banana" and help her to practise saying the new word.
65	15	"Hi-5 Fun Park"	The Best Things in Life Are Free	Be Free	25 March 2016
Mary dresses up as a ringmaster and introduces the Hi-5 fun park. Ainsley manages the dodgem car ride and signals the drivers with different percussive sounds. Stevie sets up a game of skittles using oversized bowling pins and a large beach ball. Dayen plays a magnetic fishing game and tries to catch different sized ducks to win a prize. Tanika and Chats imagine travelling through space on a flying saucer ride. Mary moves forwards and backwards in the carriage of an umbrella ride. Sharing Stories: Tanika tells a story about a rich queen (Mary) who asks her servants (Dayen and Ainsley) to buy something new and exciting for her, but ultimately finds happiness in the laughter that the court jester (Stevie) provides.
66	16	"Transport"	Sounds of the City	Busy Cities	25 March 2016
Tanika visits the airport and creates a song to help her remember the number of her flight. Mary acts as an attendant operating the elevator of a city store. Stevie alters his pretend city made of boxes so that the roads will suit the size of his car. Ainsley listens to the sounds of the city vehicles and conducts the traffic while making music. Dayen uses pots and pans to build a miniature city with a train track travelling around it. Mary rides a cycle rickshaw and transports a teddy bear. Sharing Stories: Mary tells a story about a juice vendor (Ainsley), who struggles to find a sound for his food truck that is different to those of the emergency vehicles operated by other city workers (Stevie, Dayen, and Tanika).
67	17	"Jobs"	Sounds of the City	Busy Cities	25 March 2016
Tanika and Chats work as bakers in the city and sell bread, cakes, and pastries while finding rhyming words. Stevie becomes a graphic designer and creates signs for a range of businesses in the city. Mary runs a fitness boot camp and leads different exercises. Dayen pretends to be a chef and prepares strawberry desserts for her customers. Ainsley performs in the city as a busker and tries to play his music beside a construction site and a noisy worker. Mary looks after her teddy bear patients as a nurse in a hospital. The Chatterbox: Chats and the bookworms run a city gift shop and teach Tinka how to pay for items that she'd like to buy.
68	18	"Fun in the City"	Sounds of the City	Busy Cities	25 March 2016
Stevie paints a billboard-size mural of the city using brushes, sponges, and a broom. Mary plays a clapping game with Stevie to a chant about the city. Ainsley works as a bus driver and takes his passengers to different locations around the city. Dayen visits the park in the city for a lunchtime exercise routine using the different equipment provided. Mary practises a tai chi routine at the city park. Tanika and Chats paddle a gondola down a river in Venice, stopping at the Italian food vendors along the way. Sharing Stories: Mary tells a story about a juice vendor (Ainsley), who struggles to find a sound for his food truck that is different to those of the emergency vehicles operated by other city workers (Stevie, Dayen, and Tanika).
69	19	"Cities from the Past"	Sounds of the City	Busy Cities	25 March 2016
Stevie explores the city of Machu Picchu and treks through the mountains with a llama. Mary pretends to be a llama carrying a heavy load up a mountain. Tanika and Chats dress up as Egyptian pharaohs and interpret hieroglyphics to uncover a special message. Ainsley runs a stall in a marketplace of Mumbai selling Indian musical instruments. Mary pretends to be a snake being charmed out of a basket by Indian music. Dayen imagines exploring Ancient Rome and using the landmarks as signs to navigate her way around the city. The Chatterbox: Chats and the bookworms run a city gift shop and teach Tinka how to pay for items that she'd like to buy.
70	20	"Future Cities"	Sounds of the City	Busy Cities	25 March 2016
Tanika and Chats imagine a future where new clothes can be tried on using a holographic dressing room. Mary finds new ways to move while wearing silly futuristic outfits. Stevie designs an innovative city farm where fruits and vegetables can grow inside under artificial light. Ainsley hosts a zero-gravity dance party in the city and makes bouncy music to match his movements. Dayen pretends to visit a city of the future in a time machine and explores the streets by feet. Mary pretends to be a dancing robot from a futuristic city. Sharing Stories: Mary tells a story about a juice vendor (Ainsley), who struggles to find a sound for his food truck that is different to those of the emergency vehicles operated by other city workers (Stevie, Dayen, and Tanika).
71	21	"Sports"	T.E.A.M.	Teams	25 March 2016
Stevie practises playing different sports using equipment from the kitchen. Mary and Stevie play a game of frisbee in the garden. Tanika and Chats pretend to be pirates competing in challenges on the high seas. Ainsley hosts a game show called "What's That Sport?", in which contestants Tanika and Stevie must guess which sport is being replicated with the sounds of musical instruments. Dayen burns off energy by practising taekwondo, with Jup Jup helping her use a punching bag to create a combination. Mary performs some slow tai chi stretches. Sharing Stories: Stevie tells a story about three sheep (Dayen, Mary, and Tanika) who are given the task of knitting a new garment to help the king sheep (Ainsley) keep warm throughout the winter.
72	22	"When Am I a Team Player?"	T.E.A.M.	Teams	25 March 2016
Stevie completes an exercise circuit with a life-size puppet attached to his back. Mary and Dayen do a stretching routine together. When Tanika wants to pretend she's flying a hang glider and Chats wants to go canoeing, the pair end up pretending together after Chats needs rescuing. Ainsley and Mary practise moving and making music while wearing wooden clogs. Dayen completes her basketball training and practises different skills with the ball. Mary and Tanika pretend to play tennis as a doubles team. The Chatterbox: Chats and Tinka work as a team of pretend nurses and look after the bookworms when they both fall sick with colds.
73	23	"Animal Teams"	T.E.A.M.	Teams	25 March 2016
Stevie moves like a jellyfish and searches for his friends among the waves of the ocean. Mary pretends to be a crab, snapping with her claws. Dayen loads presents on to a sleigh led by a reindeer team, to deliver them to her friends at Christmas time. Ainsley pretends to be an alpaca who auditions for an acapella singing group in front of a panel. Tanika and Chats pretend to be beavers working together to build a dam in the forest. Mary dresses up as a bee for a dance featuring bee movements. Sharing Stories: Stevie tells a story about three sheep (Dayen, Mary, and Tanika) who are given the task of knitting a new garment to help the king sheep (Ainsley) keep warm throughout the winter.
74	24	"Teams"	T.E.A.M.	Teams	25 March 2016
Stevie asks Tanika to assist him as he builds a teepee, using a sheet to wrap around bamboo poles. Tanika shows Chats a marionette puppet, and then pretends to move like a puppet on strings herself. Mary imagines becoming a marionette being controlled from above by a puppeteer. Ainsley meets a group of aliens who mistake him for a music manager from Mars. Dayen tries to decide on a circus trick to perform while Jup Jup gives her some ideas. Mary pretends to walk across a tightrope. The Chatterbox: Chats and Tinka work as a team of pretend nurses and look after the bookworms when they both fall sick with colds.
75	25	"Cooperation and Communication"	T.E.A.M.	Teams	25 March 2016
When Tanika loses her voice, Chats tries to work out what she is trying to say through charades. Mary gives her tired feet a foot massage after a long walk. Stevie becomes a waiter and cooperates with Dayen and Tanika to ensure that utensils are placed on the table correctly. Ainsley conducts a choir of puppies and kittens for a singing performance and encourages them to work together. Dayen pretends to be a firefighter and practises her emergency fire drills. Mary practises drills for surf lifesaving at the beach. Sharing Stories: Stevie tells a story about three sheep (Dayen, Mary, and Tanika) who are given the task of knitting a new garment to help the king sheep (Ainsley) keep warm throughout the winter.
