= Girl TV =

Australian TV series

Girl TV is a weekday afternoon television program, primarily aimed at teenage girls, that was broadcast by the Australian Seven Network between 2003 and 2004. The series was cancelled due to low ratings and lasted two seasons.

== Content ==
Girl TV explored varied topics, ranging from technology to fashion to the specifics of different occupations. The show was based around a "Girls can do anything" theme. The show included a mini series called It's A Girl's Life. There were 16 episodes, each about 1 minute long; each presenter dressing up as a different character.

== Presenters ==
There were four teenage female presenters, most of whom are also singers. They were:

- Simone Nalder
- Juliette Harkness
- Casey Burgess
- Chrissie Rose

== Girl (the album) ==
In early 2005, the girls released a CD and DVD set titled Gal but due to low ratings changed it to Girl. The DVD had every episode of the It's A Girl's Life mini-series in its bonus features. The album had little success on the charts and received mixed reviews. The album can be found on the iTunes Store and rarely found in retail stores. The album was released on 21 January 2005 throughout Australia. As at 2008, the album title on iTunes is A Girl's Life with the artist title listed as "Girl".

=== Track listing ===
1. It's A Girl's Life (dance mix)
2. Stuck on Me
3. Back to You
4. Shake It Up
5. All Out of Love
6. Woman Stuck in a Mans Body (Wobbo acoustic solo)
7. Emergency
8. Rock da Party (Wobbo Come Down edit)
9. Down
10. Around the World
11. Crazy Things
12. Turn the Radio Up
13. Back to You (reprise)
14. If I Can't Have You
15. Wobbo's Candy Van

== Post show ==
The girls are all looking to extend their career after Girl TV. There was a website available by following the links at yahoo7.com.au. In 2005, Juliette Harkness and Chrissie Rose made guest appearances on the ABC Network television series, Blue Water High. The Seven Network ran repeats of the show during the 2007 school holidays in Australia, and during the 2008 winter school holidays. In 2008 it has been broadcast on Saturdays around 11:00 am on the Seven Network. Casey has recently replaced Charli Robinson as the new fifth member of Hi-5.
