= Casey Burgess =

Australian actress, television personality and singer (born 1988)

- Burgess in 2011
- Born: Casey Anne Burgess; 19 December 1988 (age 37); Sydney, New South Wales, Australia
- Occupations: Actress; Television personality; singer
- Years active: 2003–present
- Spouse: Matt Meffan (m. 2023)
- Father: Ray Burgess

Casey Anne Burgess (born 19 December 1988) is an Australian actress, television personality and singer. Burgess is a former member of the Australian children's musical group Hi-5 from 2008 to 2013. She was born in Sydney, the daughter of Ray Burgess, who also pursued a musical career and was a presenter on Countdown.

== Career ==
Burgess's first television appearances included the TV show Home and Away and the TV movie Scorched. At the age of fifteen, she was also a presenter for Girl TV.

Burgess joined the Australian children's musical group Hi-5 in April 2008. As part of the group, she toured and filmed the television series of the same name. She departed the group in January 2013 after almost five years, to pursue a solo music career.

After leaving Hi-5, she began work on her debut album with Fox Studio. In 2013, Burgess was also a guest singer on the anti-fracking single "No Fracking Way" by Leo Sayer to help raise funds for anti-fracking group Lock the Gate.

In 2020, Burgess released her first solo album entitled Space to Breathe.

== Discography ==
=== Albums ===
Title	Details
Space to Breathe	Released: 2 October 2020; Label: Ambition; Formats: CD, digital download, streaming

== Filmography ==
Film roles
Year	Title	Role
2013	Hi-5 Some Kind of Wonderful	Herself

Television roles
Year	Title	Role	Notes
2003–04	Girl TV	Presenter	
2009–11	Hi-5	Presenter	Series 11 to 13
