= Tanika Anderson =

Australian performer

- Occupations: Singer; Actress; Performer
- Years active: 2014–present
- Spouse: Stevie Nicholson (m. 2019)
- Children: 1

Tanika Mei Anderson is an Australian actress and performer, best known as a former member of Australian children's musical group Hi-5 from 2014 to 2016.

She has also starred in the Australian stage productions of Frozen and Beauty and the Beast, as well as a guest role in the television series Fisk.

== Early life ==
Anderson's mother is Chinese Singaporean and her father is an Australian of Scottish heritage. Anderson attended Model Farms High School, Baulkham Hills in New South Wales, until Year 10, when she transferred to the Newtown High School of the Performing Arts. Anderson is also a graduate of the Brent Street Studios. Anderson began teaching at her own dance studio, 360 Dance, at the age of 17.

== Career ==
Anderson performed for a year as a singer and dancer at Universal Studios Singapore.

In June 2014, Anderson joined the Australian children's musical group Hi-5, replacing Lauren Brant. She had already worked with the group as an understudy and puppeteer for the previous nine months. Anderson departed the group at the end of 2016. During a promotional tour to Myanmar in 2015, Anderson experienced young women living and working in poverty, which led her to found her own ethical fashion business, You & Mei. She returned to the group as a guest performer in December 2018 and November 2019.

Anderson was cast in her first musical production, Frozen, in March 2020, as Queen Iduna. The production was due to premiere in Sydney in July 2020, but was delayed due to the COVID-19 pandemic. The production debuted at the Capitol Theatre, Sydney in December 2020.

Anderson joined the cast of Beauty and the Beast in February 2023. The production debuted at the Capitol Theatre, Sydney, in June 2023.

== Personal life ==
Anderson married fellow former Hi-5 member Stevie Nicholson in November 2019. She gave birth to their daughter, Wild Mei Nicholson, in November 2022.

== Theatre credits ==
| Year | Production | Role | Venue | Dates | Notes | Ref. |
|---|---|---|---|---|---|---|
| 2020 – 2021 | Frozen | Queen Iduna, Ensemble | Capitol Theatre, Sydney | 1 December 2020 – 23 May 2021 | Original Australian cast (Note: Anderson did not appear in the Perth run.) | |
| 2021 – 2022 | Frozen | Queen Iduna, Ensemble | Her Majesty's Theatre, Melbourne | 14 July 2021 – 26 January 2022 | Original Australian cast | |
| 2022 | Frozen | Queen Iduna, Ensemble | Queensland Performing Arts Centre, Brisbane | 12 February 2022 – 8 May 2022 | Original Australian cast | |
| 2022 | Frozen | Queen Iduna, Ensemble | Adelaide Festival Centre, Adelaide | 26 May 2022 – 7 August 2022 | Original Australian cast | |
| 2023 | Frozen | Queen Iduna, Ensemble | Marina Bay Sands, Singapore | 5 February 2023 – 19 March 2023 | Original Australian cast | |
| 2023 – 2024 | Beauty and the Beast | Ensemble | Capitol Theatre, Sydney | 14 June 2023 – 28 January 2024 | 2023 Australian revival tour | |
| 2024 | Beauty and the Beast | Ensemble | Queensland Performing Arts Centre, Brisbane | 15 February 2024 – 9 June 2024 | 2023 Australian revival tour | |
| 2024 – 2025 | Beauty and the Beast | Ensemble | Her Majesty's Theatre, Melbourne | 27 June 2024 – 16 January 2025 | 2023 Australian revival tour | |
| 2025 | Beauty and the Beast | Ensemble | Adelaide Festival Centre, Adelaide | 8 May 2025 – 6 July 2025 | 2023 Australian revival tour | |
| 2025 | Beauty and the Beast | Ensemble | Crown Theatre, Perth | 24 July 2025 – 12 October 2025 | 2023 Australian revival tour | |

== Filmography ==
Television roles
| Year | Title | Role | Notes | Ref. |
|---|---|---|---|---|
| 2014–2016 | Hi-5 House | Presenter | Series 2 to 3 | |
| 2022 | Fisk | Jess Bunting | Series 2, Episode 6 | |
