= Hi-5 House =

- Genre: Preschool; Educational; Musical
- Based on: Hi-5 by Helena Harris; Posie Graeme-Evans
- Directed by: Jonathan Geraghty
- Starring: Lauren Brant; Mary Lascaris; Ainsley Melham; Stevie Nicholson; Dayen Zheng; Tanika Anderson
- Opening theme: "Hi-5 Theme"
- Ending theme: "Hi-5 Closing Theme"
- Composer: Chris Harriott
- Countries of origin: Australia; Singapore; Malaysia
- Original language: English
- No. of series: 3
- No. of episodes: 75 (list of episodes)

Production
- Executive producer: Julie Greene
- Production locations: Infinite Studios, Singapore (Series 1); KRU Studios, Malaysia (Series 2 – 3)
- Running time: 24 minutes
- Production company: Oak3 Films (Series 1)

Original release
- Network: Nick Jr.
- Release: 4 November 2013 – 7 November 2014
- Network: Netflix
- Release: 25 March 2016

Related
- Hi-5

Hi-5 House is a Australian-Singaporean-Malaysian children's television series and a spin-off of the original Hi-5 series, which was created by Helena Harris and Posie Graeme-Evans. The series stars the children’s musical group Hi-5, with the spin-off being created to continue the series after the brand was sold by the Nine Network in 2012. Hi-5 House premiered on 4 November 2013 on Nick Jr. Australia.

The series is designed for a pre-school audience, containing a combination of musical and educational content. The segments of the show are based on an educational model. Julie Greene served as the executive producer for the program, having previously worked as a series producer on the original show. The cast is composed of Lauren Brant, Mary Lascaris, Ainsley Melham, Stevie Nicholson, and Dayen Zheng. Brant was replaced by Tanika Anderson for the later two series. Hi-5 House received an Asian Television Award for Best Preschool Program in 2015.

The third and final series was made available worldwide on Netflix on 25 March 2016. Hi-5 House concluded as a result of the Nine Network renewing its partnership with the Hi-5 franchise in October 2016 with plans to revive the original program with a new cast in 2017.

== Format ==
Hi-5 House is a variety-style series for pre-schoolers which incorporates educational trends combined with pop music. The premise remains similar to its predecessor series Hi-5. The show's five cast members are collectively known as Hi-5, and present individual segments as well as performing songs as a group. The set of Hi-5 House is designed as a house, and presented as a place where the cast live together. Each presenter’s segment is adapted to take place in a room of the house, to replicate a child's immediate surroundings.

Each episode features each cast member presenting their own individual segment, which is modelled towards a particular learning style based on Howard Gardner's Theory of multiple intelligences. Puzzles and Patterns (set in the kitchen) has a focus on logical thinking and mathematics, with a puppet named Jup Jup used as a tool for the presenter to complete puzzles or solve problems. Musicality is explored through the Making Music segment (set in the music room), with an emphasis on pitch, rhythm, beat, melody, and using a variety of real and pretend instruments. The presenter of Body Move (set in the backyard) encourages children to participate in movement and dance, developing physical coordination and motor development. Linguistics and aural skills are at the centre of the Word Play segment (set in the bedroom), featuring a puppet named Chatterbox who assists in the discovery of language through stories and rhymes. Shapes in Space (set in the rumpus room) focuses on visual and spatial awareness, with the presenter exploring shapes, colour, and everyday materials such as boxes and playdough.

The final segment in which the cast comes together is entitled Sharing Stories, where a story is told to explore interpersonal relationships and emotions. The episodes are bookended with a Song of the Week; a pop-style feature song which corresponds with the weekly theme and sets an educational topic for the week's episodes. An additional segment, The Chatterbox, focuses on learning of the English language through simple words and phrases, featuring the puppet of the same name teaching a toy robot named Tinka how to speak.

== Cast ==
- Lauren Brant (series 1)
- Mary Lascaris (series 1–3)
- Ainsley Melham (series 1–3)
- Stevie Nicholson (series 1–3)
- Dayen Zheng (series 1–3)
- Tanika Anderson (series 2–3)

== Production ==
The original Hi-5 series premiered on the Nine Network in 1999, created by television producer Helena Harris and co-producer Posie Graeme-Evans. The program ran for thirteen series and concluded its run in 2011 as a result of the franchise being acquired by equity group Asiasons in 2012. In June 2013, executive producer Julie Greene announced that the franchise would be producing a revamped series, a spin-off to be titled Hi-5 House. Greene had previously worked on the original program as a series producer, before becoming the brand's executive creative director in 2012.

The first series of Hi-5 House was filmed at Infinite Studios in Singapore from August to October 2013, and premiered on pay-TV channel Nick Jr. in Australia on 4 November 2013. Live action segments featuring children were filmed on location at Singapore Zoo and Sentosa.

The second series was filmed at KRU Studios in Malaysia from April to June 2014 and premiered on 6 October on Nick Jr. The series won an Asian Television Award for Best Preschool Program in 2015.

The third series was filmed in Malaysia from March to May 2015. This series premiered exclusively on 25 March 2016 on online television streaming service Netflix in Australia, New Zealand, the United States, Canada, the United Kingdom, and Latin America. It later aired on Nick Jr. from 26 September onwards.

Hi-5 House ended production in 2016 as a result of the Nine Network renewing its partnership in with the Hi-5 franchise in October with plans to revive the original Hi-5 television series with a new cast in 2017.

== Episodes ==
=== Series overview ===
| Series | Episodes | Originally released | | |
| Series | Episodes | First released | Last released | Network |
|---|---|---|---|---|
| 1 | 25 | 4 November 2013 | 6 December 2013 | Nick Jr. |
| 2 | 25 | 6 October 2014 | 7 November 2014 | Nick Jr. |
| 3 | 25 | 25 March 2016 | | Netflix |

== Reception ==
=== Viewership ===
Hi-5 House was the highest rating program on Disney Junior Asia by 2016. In Australia, the premiere episode in 2013 was viewed by 47,000 people on pay TV. Subsequent episodes received recorded viewerships ranging between 36,000 and 49,000.

=== Critical reception ===
In 2014, Jo Abi of blog Mamamia commended the diversity of the Hi-5 House cast. Reviewing the DVD compilation Happy Holidays in 2015, a reviewer at This Charming Mum praised the show’s costuming and set design, as well as the "specific messages around healthy living [and] environmental awareness" depicted. The blog At Grandma’s Place commended the series' educational segments, describing them as "bright, colourful and short enough to hold the attention of even the younger kids."

== Release ==
=== Broadcast ===
Hi-5 House made its international debut on Disney Junior Asia on 9 December 2013. The first series premiered on Australian free-to-air channel Eleven on 24 February 2014 after previously airing exclusively on pay TV. The series aired in New Zealand on free-to-air channel Four in July 2014. The second series debuted on Disney Junior Asia on 8 December 2014.

The third series of Hi-5 House was removed from Netflix in September 2018, after 30 months on the streaming service.

=== Home media ===
| Series | DVD title | Release date (Region 4) | Songs of the Week | Special features |
|---|---|---|---|---|
| 1 | Dream House | 2 April 2014 | Come on in; Reach Out | —N/a |
| 1 | So Many Animals | 2 April 2014 | So Many Animals; Dance with the Dinosaurs | —N/a |
| 1 | Songs with Friends! | 11 June 2014 | Come on in; Move Your Body; Reach Out; So Many Animals; Dance with the Dinosaurs | —N/a |
| 1 | Big Adventures! | 17 September 2014 | Dance with the Dinosaurs; Move Your Body | —N/a |
| 2 | Happy Holidays | 2 December 2015 | Playtime; It's Our Planet; It's a Party | Hi-5 Visit Myanmar with World Vision Australia; Dance Lesson to "It's a Party" |

== Awards and nominations ==
List of awards and nominations received by Hi-5 House
| Award | Year | Recipient(s) and nominee(s) | Category | Result | Ref. |
|---|---|---|---|---|---|
| Apollo Awards | 2015 | Chris Harriott, Various (for Hi-5 House) | Best Music Composition (Full Length) | Nominated | |
| Asian Television Awards | 2015 | Hi-5 House, Series 2 | Best Preschool Programme | Won | |
| Asian Television Awards | 2016 | Hi-5 House, Series 3 | Best Preschool Programme | Nominated | |
