= Tim Maddren =

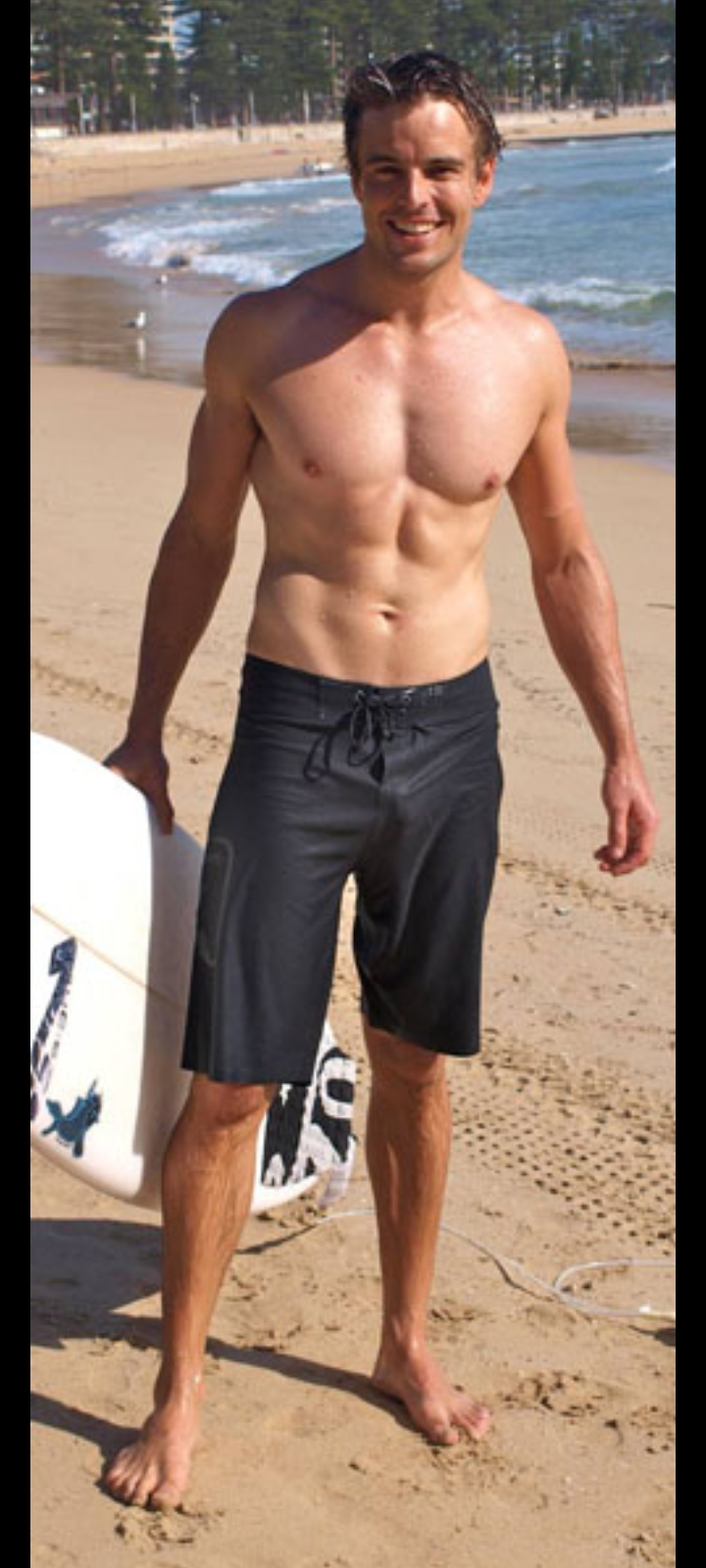
- Maddren in 2013

Background information
- Born: March 3, 1984 (age 42); Blenheim, New Zealand
- Genres: Pop, rock, children's music
- Occupations: Singer, Actor, Entertainer, Dancer
- Instruments: Guitar, vocals, drums, piano, trumpet
- Years active: 2009–present
- Website: TimMaddren.com.au

Timothy Maddren (born 3 March 1984) is a New Zealand musician best known as a member of the Australian children's musical group Hi-5 between 2009 and 2013. He left Hi-5 after four years and has worked at Hi-5 in three seasons (135 episodes).

== Early life ==
Maddren was born in Blenheim, New Zealand. He was raised in a musical family and was encouraged from an early age to develop his performing and entertaining skills. He plays guitar, piano, trumpet and drums. Maddren is left-handed.

In 2003, Maddren moved to Perth, Australia to study at the Western Australian Academy of Performing Arts from which he graduated in 2005.

== Career ==
He has performed in many theatrical productions, including Fiddler on the Roof (2007), A Funny Thing Happened On The Way To The Forum, Chess, Les Miserables, Crazy For You, International Miners Emporium, Street Scene, Guys & Dolls, Little Shop of Horrors and My Fair Lady. In 2008 he was part of the original Australian cast in the musical comedy Altar Boyz playing the role of Luke.

Television credits include Blue Water High playing the guest role of Connor (ABC TV).

Maddren taught singing and acting at the Ministry of Dance, North Melbourne.

He became part of the Hi-5 cast on 5 January 2009. Maddren has expressed that the best part of Hi-5 is "seeing all the happy faces on the kids when we're up there performing in front of them."

Maddren had a parallel career to Hi-5, acting in The Addams Family, playing Lucas Beineke.

== Filmography ==
Film roles
Year	Title	Role	
2013	Mr. Viral	Little Boy	Uncredited

Television roles
Year	Title	Role	Notes
2009–11	Hi-5	Himself	Series 11 to 13
