= Stevie Nicholson =

Australian actor and singer

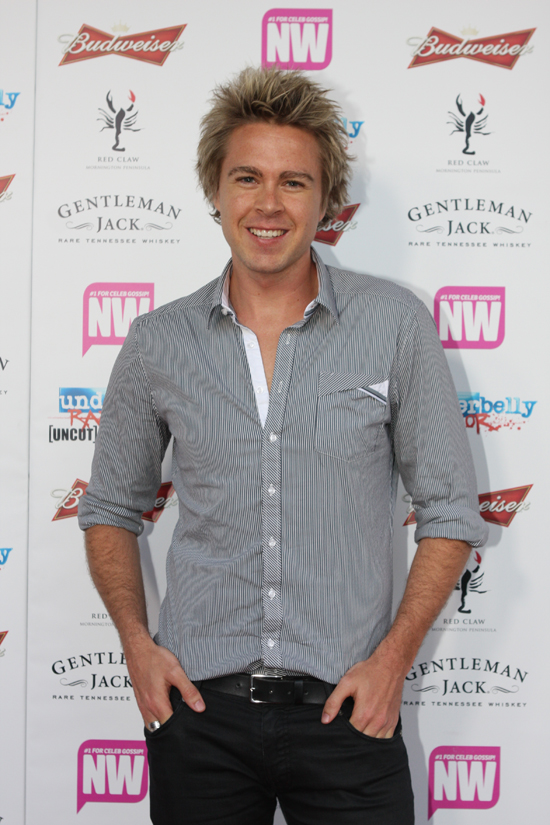
- Nicholson in November 2011
- Born: Steven Nicholson; 30 December 1983 (age 42); Melbourne, Australia
- Education: St Kevin's College; Deakin University
- Occupations: Actor; singer
- Years active: 2007–present
- Spouse: Tanika Anderson (m. 2019)
- Children: 1

Steven Nicholson (born 30 December 1983) is an Australian television personality and performer. He was a former member of Australian children's musical group Hi-5 from 2007 to 2015.

== Early life ==
Nicholson was born in Hobart and grew up in Melbourne, attending St Kevin's College. Before joining Hi-5, he worked at Brainstorm Productions on a show called Verbal Combat.

He has revealed that his childhood was marred by a serious illness, bacterial meningitis, before he discovered acting in his teenage years. Children's entertainment programmes such as Playschool were key to his recovery, which explains his continued passion for the industry.

He completed an Arts degree at Deakin University.

== Career ==
Nicholson joined the Australian children's musical group Hi-5 in June 2007 when original member Tim Harding was injured in a serious motorcycle accident. Nicholson was hired as an understudy just a few days prior to this, and immediately took on Harding's touring responsibilities. In November, Harding announced his permanent departure from the group after recovering from his injuries, with Nicholson taking his place as a permanent member Creator of the franchise Helena Harris stated, "it's like [he] was born to this job."

Nicholson filmed seven television seasons of Hi-5 and Hi-5 House, before announcing in August 2015 that he would be departing the group at the end of the year. He revealed intentions to further his performing career and author a children's book entitled Superdudes. Of his time with Hi-5, he stated, "it has been an absolute whirlwind journey", and expressed that he had learned more from children than he had been able to teach. His final performance was on tour with the group in December. His replacement was Lachie Dearing. He returned to the group as a guest performer in December 2018 and November 2019.

After Superdudes was released in October 2015, Nicholson transferred the work to the stage with a tour featuring characters from the book. The tour experienced an overwhelmingly positive response in the Philippines in 2016. The group toured regionally across Singapore, Hong Kong and Indonesia in 2019.

== Personal life ==
Nicholson married fellow former Hi-5 member Tanika Anderson in November 2019. Anderson gave birth to their daughter, Wild Mei Nicholson, on 8 November 2022.

== Publications ==
- Superdudes (October 2015)

== Filmography ==
Film roles
Year	Title	Role
2013	Hi-5 Some Kind of Wonderful	Himself

Television roles
Year	Title	Role	Notes
2008–11	Hi-5	Himself	Series 10 to 13
2013–16	Hi-5 House	Himself	Series 1 to 3
