= List of Hi-5 live performances =

Hi-5 live performances
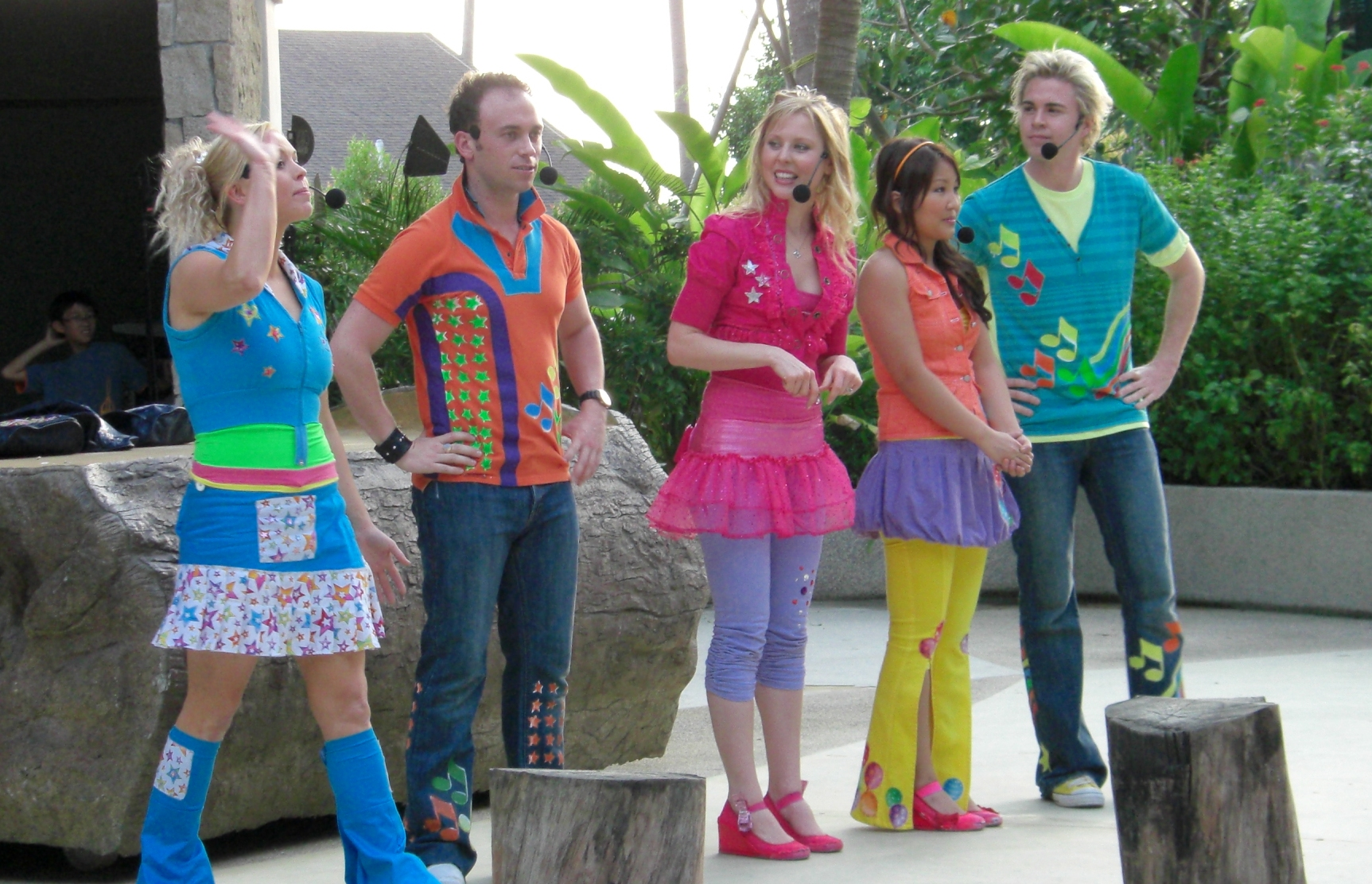
- Group members in 2007 (L-R): Kellie Crawford, Nathan Foley, Charli Robinson, Sun Park, and Stevie Nicholson
- Concert tours: 18
- Televised appearances: 16

Australian children's musical group Hi-5 performed on eighteen concert tours. In 1999, International Concert Attractions (ICA) Australia were signed as the tour promoters for Hi-5 for their tour of Australia.

Hi-5's first national tour, Jump and Jive with Hi-5, was performed from September 1999 to January 2000, beginning in Hobart, Tasmania, and continuing to venues such as the Sydney Opera House and Newcastle Civic Theatre in New South Wales. 100,000 people attended the tour in 1999; the concerts each ran for 50 minutes. In 2000, the group performed over 180 shows in a national tour of Australia. The It's a Party concert began in June and contained songs from the first two albums, Jump and Jive with Hi-5 and It's a Party. In the first four weeks of ticket sales, over 50,000 units were sold. The group performed at the State Theatre in Sydney in October. In 2001, Hi-5 performed to audiences in Australia and New Zealand. The Hi-5 Alive tour ran for three months and toured Adelaide, Perth, Melbourne, Canberra, Sydney, and Newcastle.

The group debuted their Space Magic tour in the United Kingdom in March 2005, several months before the show was first performed in Australia. The tour was performed in arenas around Australia in November and December 2005, to maximise the audience capacity. The concert was reported to run from 75 to 90 minutes and was the group's "biggest tour ever".

== Concert tours ==
List of concerts performed by Hi-5
| Year | Tour | Country | State / Region | Date | Venue | Times | Ref. |
|---|---|---|---|---|---|---|---|
| 1999 | —N/a | Australia | New South Wales | April 1999 | Royal Randwick Racecourse, Randwick, NSW | —N/a | |
| 1999 | —N/a | Australia | New South Wales | 6 July 1999 | —N/a | —N/a | —N/a |
| 1999 | Jump and Jive with Hi-5 | Australia | Tasmania | 13 September 1999 | Derwent Entertainment Centre, Hobart | 11:30am, 1:30pm, 3:30pm | |
| 1999 | Jump and Jive with Hi-5 | Australia | Tasmania | 14 September 1999 | Princess Theatre, Launceston | —N/a | |
| 1999 | Jump and Jive with Hi-5 | Australia | Victoria | 28 September 1999 | Robert Blackwood Hall, Monash University, Melbourne | —N/a | |
| 1999 | Jump and Jive with Hi-5 | Australia | New South Wales | 30 September 1999 | Sydney Opera House (Concert Hall), Sydney | —N/a | |
| 1999 | Jump and Jive with Hi-5 | Australia | New South Wales | 2 October 1999 | Sydney Opera House (Concert Hall), Sydney | —N/a | |
| 1999 | Jump and Jive with Hi-5 | Australia | New South Wales | 9 October 1999 | Newcastle Civic Theatre, Newcastle | 11:30am, 1:30pm, 3:30pm | |
| 1999 | Jump and Jive with Hi-5 | Australia | South Australia | 23 October 1999 | Thebarton Theatre, Torrensville | —N/a | |
| 1999 | Jump and Jive with Hi-5 | Australia | Queensland | 13 November 1999 | Concert Hall, Queensland Performing Arts Centre, South Bank | —N/a | |
| 1999 | Jump and Jive with Hi-5 | Australia | Queensland | 14 November 1999 | Concert Hall, Queensland Performing Arts Centre, South Bank | —N/a | |
| 1999 | Jump and Jive with Hi-5 | Australia | Australian Capital Territory | 20 November 1999 | Canberra Theatre Centre, Canberra | —N/a | |
| 1999 | Jump and Jive with Hi-5 | Australia | Victoria | 28 November 1999 | Ballarat Civic Hall, Ballarat | —N/a | |
| 1999 | Jump and Jive with Hi-5 | Australia | New South Wales | 9 December 1999 | Burwood RSL, Burwood | —N/a | |
| 1999 | Jump and Jive with Hi-5 | Australia | Queensland | 11 December 1999 | Gold Coast Arts Centre, Gold Coast | —N/a | |
| 1999 | Jump and Jive with Hi-5 | Australia | Queensland | 12 December 1999 | Gold Coast Arts Centre, Gold Coast | —N/a | |
| 2000 | Jump and Jive with Hi-5 | Australia | Western Australia | 12 January 2000 | Perth Concert Hall, Perth | —N/a | |
| 2000 | Jump and Jive with Hi-5 | Australia | Western Australia | 13 January 2000 | Perth Concert Hall, Perth | —N/a | |
| 2000 | Jump and Jive with Hi-5 | Australia | Western Australia | 14 January 2000 | Perth Concert Hall, Perth | —N/a | |
| 2000 | Jump and Jive with Hi-5 | Australia | Western Australia | 15 January 2000 | Perth Concert Hall, Perth | —N/a | |
| 2000 | It's a Party | Australia | New South Wales | 20 June 2000 | Canterbury Hurlstone Park RSL, Hurlstone Park | —N/a | |
| 2000 | It's a Party | Australia | New South Wales | 22 June 2000 | Smithfield RSL, Smithfield | —N/a | |
| 2000 | It's a Party | Australia | New South Wales | 24 June 2000 | Balmain Leagues Club, Balmain | —N/a | |
| 2000 | It's a Party | Australia | New South Wales | 26 June 2000 | Burwood RSL, Burwood | —N/a | |
| 2000 | It's a Party | Australia | New South Wales | 28 June 2000 | Shellharbour Workers Club, Shellharbour | —N/a | |
| 2000 | It's a Party | Australia | New South Wales | 1 July 2000 | Hills Centre, Castle Hill | —N/a | |
| 2000 | It's a Party | Australia | New South Wales | 3 July 2000 | Mingara Recreation Club, Tumbi Umbi | —N/a | |
| 2000 | It's a Party | Australia | New South Wales | 4 July 2000 | Newcastle Civic Theatre, Newcastle | —N/a | |
| 2000 | It's a Party | Australia | Queensland | 8 July 2000 | South Bank Piazza, Brisbane | 11:30am, 1:30pm, 3:30pm | |
| 2000 | It's a Party | Australia | Queensland | 9 July 2000 | South Bank Piazza, Brisbane | 11:30am, 1:30pm | |
| 2000 | It's a Party | Australia | Queensland | 11 July 2000 | Moncreiff Theatre, Bundaberg | —N/a | |
| 2000 | It's a Party | Australia | Queensland | 12 July 2000 | Pilbeam Theatre, Rockhampton | —N/a | |
| 2000 | It's a Party | Australia | Queensland | 14 July 2000 | Townsville Entertainment & Convention Centre, Townsville | —N/a | |
| 2000 | It's a Party | Australia | Queensland | 15 July 2000 | Civic Theatre, Cairns | —N/a | |
| 2000 | It's a Party | Australia | Queensland | 16 July 2000 | Civic Theatre, Cairns | —N/a | |
| 2000 | It's a Party | Australia | Queensland | 19 July 2000 | Morayfield Community Centre, Morayfield | —N/a | |
| 2000 | It's a Party | Australia | Queensland | 20 July 2000 | Kedron | —N/a | |
| 2000 | It's a Party | Australia | Queensland | 21 July 2000 | Nerang | —N/a | |
| 2000 | It's a Party | Australia | New South Wales | 22 July 2000 | Twin Towns Services Club, Tweed Heads | —N/a | |
| 2000 | It's a Party | Australia | Queensland | 23 July 2000 | Holland Park, Brisbane | —N/a | |
| 2000 | It's a Party | Australia | New South Wales | 8 August 2000 | Rooty Hill RSL, Rooty Hill | —N/a | |
| 2000 | It's a Party | Australia | South Australia | 19 August 2000 | Thebarton Theatre, Torrensville | 10:00am, 12:00pm, 2:00pm | |
| 2000 | It's a Party | Australia | South Australia | 20 August 2000 | Thebarton Theatre, Torrensville | 10:00am, 12:00pm, 2:00pm | |
| 2000 | It's a Party | Australia | Western Australia | 23 August 2000 | Bunbury Entertainment Centre, Bunbury | —N/a | |
| 2000 | It's a Party | Australia | Western Australia | 25 August 2000 | Perth Concert Hall, Perth | —N/a | |
| 2000 | It's a Party | Australia | Western Australia | 26 August 2000 | Perth Concert Hall, Perth | —N/a | |
| 2000 | It's a Party | Australia | Western Australia | 27 August 2000 | Perth Concert Hall, Perth | —N/a | |
| 2000 | It's a Party | Australia | Western Australia | 28 August 2000 | Perth Concert Hall, Perth | —N/a | |
| 2000 | It's a Party | Australia | New South Wales | 28 October 2000 | State Theatre, Sydney | 11:30am, 1:30pm, 3:30pm | |
| 2000 | It's a Party | Australia | New South Wales | 29 October 2000 | State Theatre, Sydney | 10:00am, 12:00pm, 2:00pm | |
| 2000 | Jump and Jive with Hi-5 | Singapore | Central Region | 8 December 2000 | The Rock Auditorium, Suntec City Mall, Suntec City | 11:00am, 1:00pm, 3:00pm | |
| 2000 | Jump and Jive with Hi-5 | Singapore | Central Region | 9 December 2000 | The Rock Auditorium, Suntec City Mall, Suntec City | 2:00pm, 4:00pm, 6:00pm | |
| 2001 | It's a Party | Australia | Northern Territory | 25 January 2001 | Darwin Entertainment Centre, Darwin (Note: The group performed five shows across two days at this venue.) | —N/a | |
| 2001 | It's a Party | Australia | Northern Territory | 26 January 2001 | Darwin Entertainment Centre, Darwin | —N/a | |
| 2001 | It's a Party | New Zealand | North Island | 31 March 2001 | Auckland | —N/a | |
| 2001 | Hi-5 Alive | Australia | New South Wales | 18 August 2001 | Newcastle Civic Theatre, Newcastle (Note: The group performed six shows across two days at this venue.) | —N/a | |
| 2001 | Hi-5 Alive | Australia | New South Wales | 19 August 2001 | Newcastle Civic Theatre, Newcastle | —N/a | |
| 2001 | Hi-5 Alive | Australia | New South Wales | 22 August 2001 | Cronulla Sutherland Leagues Club, Cronulla | —N/a | |
| 2001 | Hi-5 Alive | Australia | New South Wales | 23 August 2001 | Cronulla Sutherland Leagues Club, Cronulla | —N/a | |
| 2001 | Hi-5 Alive | Australia | New South Wales | 25 August 2001 | Hills Centre, Castle Hill | —N/a | |
| 2001 | Hi-5 Alive | Australia | New South Wales | 26 August 2001 | Hills Centre, Castle Hill | —N/a | |
| 2001 | Hi-5 Alive | Australia | New South Wales | 27 August 2001 | Canterbury Hurlstone Park RSL, Hurlstone Park | —N/a | |
| 2001 | Hi-5 Alive | Australia | New South Wales | 28 August 2001 | Canterbury Hurlstone Park RSL, Hurlstone Park | —N/a | |
| 2001 | Hi-5 Alive | Australia | New South Wales | 1 September 2001 | Hordern Pavilion, Moore Park | —N/a | |
| 2001 | Hi-5 Alive | Australia | New South Wales | 2 September 2001 | Hordern Pavilion, Moore Park | —N/a | |
| 2001 | Hi-5 Alive | Australia | New South Wales | 5 September 2001 | Revesby Workers Club, Revesby | —N/a | |
| 2001 | Hi-5 Alive | Australia | New South Wales | 8 September 2001 | Wollongong Entertainment Centre, Wollongong | 11:30am, 1:30pm, 3:30pm | |
| 2001 | Hi-5 Alive | Australia | Australian Capital Territory | 9 September 2001 | Canberra Theatre Centre, Canberra | —N/a | |
| 2001 | Hi-5 Alive | Australia | Victoria | 15 September 2001 | Robert Blackwood Hall, Monash University, Melbourne | —N/a | |
| 2001 | Hi-5 Alive | Australia | Victoria | 18 September 2001 | Geelong Arts Centre, Geelong | —N/a | |
| 2001 | Hi-5 Alive | Australia | Victoria | 20 September 2001 | George Wood Performing Arts Centre, Ringwood | —N/a | |
| 2001 | Hi-5 Alive | Australia | Victoria | 21 September 2001 | George Wood Performing Arts Centre, Ringwood | —N/a | |
| 2001 | Hi-5 Alive | Australia | Victoria | 22 September 2001 | Besen Centre, Burwood | —N/a | |
| 2001 | Hi-5 Alive | Australia | Victoria | 23 September 2001 | Besen Centre, Burwood | —N/a | |
| 2001 | Hi-5 Alive | Australia | Victoria | 26 September 2001 | State Theatre, Melbourne (Note: The group performed three shows per day across five days at this venue.) | 11:30am, 1:30pm, 3:30pm | |
| 2001 | Hi-5 Alive | Australia | Victoria | 27 September 2001 | State Theatre, Melbourne | —N/a | |
| 2001 | Hi-5 Alive | Australia | Victoria | 28 September 2001 | State Theatre, Melbourne | —N/a | |
| 2001 | Hi-5 Alive | Australia | Victoria | 29 September 2001 | State Theatre, Melbourne | —N/a | |
| 2001 | Hi-5 Alive | Australia | Victoria | 30 September 2001 | State Theatre, Melbourne | —N/a | |
| 2001 | Hi-5 Alive | Australia | Western Australia | 4 October 2001 | Perth Concert Hall, Perth | 11:30am, 1:30pm, 3:30pm | |
| 2001 | Hi-5 Alive | Australia | Western Australia | 5 October 2001 | Perth Concert Hall, Perth | 10:00am, 12:00pm, 2:00pm | |
| 2001 | Hi-5 Alive | Australia | Western Australia | 6 October 2001 | Perth Concert Hall, Perth | 10:00am, 12:00pm, 2:00pm | |
| 2001 | Hi-5 Alive | Australia | Western Australia | 7 October 2001 | Perth Concert Hall, Perth | 10:00am, 12:00pm, 2:00pm | |
| 2001 | Hi-5 Alive | Australia | South Australia | 11 October 2001 | Thebarton Theatre, Torrensville | 11:30am, 1:30pm, 3:30pm | |
| 2001 | Hi-5 Alive | Australia | South Australia | 12 October 2001 | Thebarton Theatre, Torrensville | 10:00am, 12:00pm, 2:00pm | |
| 2001 | Hi-5 Alive | Australia | South Australia | 13 October 2001 | Thebarton Theatre, Torrensville | 10:00am, 12:00pm, 2:00pm | |
| 2001 | Hi-5 Alive | Australia | South Australia | 14 October 2001 | Thebarton Theatre, Torrensville | 10:00am, 12:00pm, 2:00pm | |
| 2001 | Hi-5 Alive | Australia | Queensland | 17 November 2001 | Cairns Convention Centre, Cairns | —N/a | |
| 2001 | Hi-5 Alive | Australia | Queensland | 18 November 2001 | Townsville Entertainment & Convention Centre, Townsville | —N/a | |
| 2001 | Hi-5 Alive | Australia | Queensland | 22 November 2001 | Brolga Theatre, Maryborough | —N/a | |
| 2001 | Hi-5 Alive | Australia | Queensland | 24 November 2001 | Pilbeam Theatre, Rockhampton | —N/a | |
| 2001 | Hi-5 Alive | Australia | Queensland | 25 November 2001 | Pilbeam Theatre, Rockhampton | —N/a | |
| 2001 | Hi-5 Alive | Australia | Queensland | 27 November 2001 | Empire Theatre, Toowoomba | —N/a | |
| 2001 | Hi-5 Alive | Australia | New South Wales | 29 November 2001 | Twin Towns Services Club, Tweed Heads | —N/a | |
| 2001 | Hi-5 Alive | Australia | Queensland | 2 December 2001 | Brisbane Convention & Exhibition Centre, Brisbane | —N/a | |
| 2001 | Hi-5 Alive | Australia | Queensland | 3 December 2001 | Brisbane Convention & Exhibition Centre, Brisbane | —N/a | |
| 2001 | Hi-5 Alive | New Zealand | North Island | 10 December 2001 | Regent on Broadway, Palmerston North | —N/a | |
| 2001 | Hi-5 Alive | New Zealand | North Island | 11 December 2001 | Wellington Town Hall, Wellington | —N/a | |
| 2001 | Hi-5 Alive | New Zealand | North Island | 13 December 2001 | Napier Municipal Theatre, Napier | —N/a | |
| 2001 | Hi-5 Alive | New Zealand | North Island | 15 December 2001 | Civic Theatre, Auckland | —N/a | |
| 2002 | Celebrate | Australia | New South Wales | 17 August 2002 | Newcastle Civic Theatre, Newcastle | —N/a | |
| 2002 | Celebrate | Australia | New South Wales | 18 August 2002 | Newcastle Civic Theatre, Newcastle | —N/a | |
| 2002 | Celebrate | Australia | Western Australia | 29 August 2002 | Perth Concert Hall, Perth | 10:00am, 12:00pm, 2:00pm | |
| 2002 | Celebrate | Australia | Western Australia | 30 August 2002 | Perth Concert Hall, Perth | 10:00am, 12:00pm, 2:00pm | |
| 2002 | Celebrate | Australia | Western Australia | 31 August 2002 | Perth Concert Hall, Perth | 10:00am, 12:00pm, 2:00pm | |
| 2002 | Celebrate | Australia | Western Australia | 1 September 2002 | Perth Concert Hall, Perth | 10:00am, 12:00pm, 2:00pm | |
| 2002 | Celebrate | Australia | South Australia | 6 September 2002 | Thebarton Theatre, Torrensville | —N/a | |
| 2002 | Celebrate | Australia | South Australia | 7 September 2002 | Thebarton Theatre, Torrensville | —N/a | |
| 2002 | Celebrate | Australia | South Australia | 8 September 2002 | Thebarton Theatre, Torrensville | —N/a | |
| 2002 | Celebrate | Australia | New South Wales | 13 September 2002 | Hills Centre, Castle Hill | —N/a | |
| 2002 | Celebrate | Australia | Tasmania | 19 September 2002 | Derwent Entertainment Centre, Hobart | —N/a | |
| 2002 | Celebrate | Australia | Tasmania | 21 September 2002 | Princess Theatre, Launceston | —N/a | |
| 2002 | Celebrate | Australia | Victoria | 24 September 2002 | George Wood Performing Arts Centre, Ringwood | —N/a | |
| 2002 | Celebrate | Australia | Victoria | 27 September 2002 | Costa Hall, Deakin University, Geelong | —N/a | |
| 2002 | Celebrate | Australia | Victoria | 28 September 2002 | Robert Blackwood Hall, Monash University, Melbourne | —N/a | |
| 2002 | Celebrate | Australia | Victoria | 29 September 2002 | Robert Blackwood Hall, Monash University, Melbourne | —N/a | |
| 2002 | Celebrate | Australia | Victoria | 1 October 2002 | Hamer Hall, Arts Centre, Melbourne | 11:30am, 1:30pm, 3:30pm | |
| 2002 | Celebrate | Australia | Victoria | 2 October 2002 | Hamer Hall, Arts Centre, Melbourne | 10:00am, 12:00pm, 2:00pm | |
| 2002 | Celebrate | Australia | Victoria | 3 October 2002 | Hamer Hall, Arts Centre, Melbourne | 10:00am, 12:00pm, 2:00pm | |
| 2002 | Celebrate | Australia | Victoria | 5 October 2002 | Hamer Hall, Arts Centre, Melbourne | 2:00pm, 4:00pm | |
| 2002 | Celebrate | Australia | Victoria | 6 October 2002 | Hamer Hall, Arts Centre, Melbourne | 2:00pm, 4:00pm | |
| 2002 | Celebrate | Australia | New South Wales | 9 October 2002 | Theatre Royal, Sydney | —N/a | |
| 2002 | Celebrate | Australia | Australian Capital Territory | 19 October 2002 | Canberra Theatre, Canberra | —N/a | |
| 2002 | Celebrate | Australia | Australian Capital Territory | 20 October 2002 | Canberra Theatre, Canberra | —N/a | |
| 2002 | Celebrate | Australia | New South Wales | 23 October 2002 | Revesby Workers Club, Revesby | —N/a | |
| 2002 | Celebrate | Australia | New South Wales | 24 October 2002 | Revesby Workers Club, Revesby | —N/a | |
| 2002 | Celebrate | Australia | Queensland | 26 October 2002 | Gold Coast Arts Centre, Gold Coast | —N/a | |
| 2002 | Celebrate | Australia | Queensland | 30 October 2002 | Brisbane Convention & Exhibition Centre, Brisbane | —N/a | |
| 2002 | Celebrate | Australia | New South Wales | 6 November 2002 | Blacktown RSL, Blacktown | —N/a | |
| 2002 | Celebrate | Australia | New South Wales | 10 November 2002 | Wollongong Entertainment Centre, Wollongong | 10:00am, 12:00pm, 2:00pm | |
| 2002 | Hi-5 Alive | Singapore | Central Region | 16 November 2002 | Kallang Theatre, Kallang | —N/a | |
| 2002 | Hi-5 Alive | Singapore | Central Region | 17 November 2002 | Kallang Theatre, Kallang | —N/a | |
| 2002 | Hi-5 Alive | Singapore | Central Region | 18 November 2002 | Kallang Theatre, Kallang | —N/a | |
| 2002 | Hi-5 Alive | Singapore | Central Region | 19 November 2002 | Kallang Theatre, Kallang | —N/a | |
| 2002 | Hi-5 Alive | Singapore | Central Region | 20 November 2002 | Kallang Theatre, Kallang | —N/a | |
| 2002 | Hi-5 Alive | Singapore | Central Region | 22 November 2002 | Kallang Theatre, Kallang | —N/a | |
| 2002 | Hi-5 Alive | Singapore | Central Region | 23 November 2002 | Kallang Theatre, Kallang | —N/a | |
| 2002 | Celebrate | New Zealand | North Island | 3 December 2002 | Napier Municipal Theatre, Napier | —N/a | |
| 2002 | Celebrate | New Zealand | North Island | 4 December 2002 | Rotorua Sportsdrome, Rotorua | —N/a | |
| 2002 | Celebrate | New Zealand | North Island | 5 December 2002 | Civic Theatre, Auckland | —N/a | |
| 2002 | Celebrate | New Zealand | North Island | 6 December 2002 | Civic Theatre, Auckland | —N/a | |
| 2002 | Celebrate | New Zealand | North Island | 7 December 2002 | Civic Theatre, Auckland | —N/a | |
| 2002 | Celebrate | New Zealand | North Island | 8 December 2002 | Civic Theatre, Auckland | —N/a | |
| 2002 | Celebrate | New Zealand | North Island | 11 December 2002 | Wellington Town Hall, Wellington | —N/a | |
| 2002 | Celebrate | New Zealand | North Island | 12 December 2002 | Wellington Town Hall, Wellington | —N/a | |
| 2002 | Celebrate | New Zealand | South Island | 15 December 2002 | Christchurch Town Hall, Christchurch | —N/a | |
| 2003 | Celebrate | Australia | New South Wales | 14 January 2003 | Penrith Panthers, Penrith | 11:30am, 1:30pm, 3:30pm | |
| 2003 | Celebrate | Australia | Victoria | 16 January 2003 | Besen Centre, Burwood | —N/a | |
| 2003 | Celebrate | Australia | Victoria | 17 January 2003 | Besen Centre, Burwood | —N/a | |
| 2003 | Celebrate | Australia | Victoria | 18 January 2003 | Frankston Arts Centre, Frankston | —N/a | |
| 2003 | Celebrate | Australia | Victoria | 19 January 2003 | Frankston Arts Centre, Frankston | —N/a | |
| 2003 | Come On and Party! | Australia | New South Wales | 1 November 2003 | Hills Centre, Castle Hill | —N/a | |
| 2003 | Come On and Party! | Australia | New South Wales | 4 November 2003 | State Theatre, Sydney | 11:30am, 1:30pm, 3:30pm | |
| 2003 | Come On and Party! | Australia | New South Wales | 5 November 2003 | State Theatre, Sydney | 10:00am, 12:00pm, 2:00pm | |
| 2003 | Come On and Party! | Australia | New South Wales | 6 November 2003 | State Theatre, Sydney | 10:00am, 12:00pm | |
| 2003 | Come On and Party! | Australia | New South Wales | 8 November 2003 | Newcastle Civic Theatre, Newcastle | —N/a | |
| 2003 | Come On and Party! | Australia | New South Wales | 9 November 2003 | Newcastle Civic Theatre, Newcastle | —N/a | |
| 2003 | Come On and Party! | Australia | Victoria | 11 November 2003 | Robert Blackwood Hall, Monash University, Melbourne | —N/a | |
| 2003 | Come On and Party! | Australia | Victoria | 12 November 2003 | Robert Blackwood Hall, Monash University, Melbourne | —N/a | |
| 2003 | Come On and Party! | Australia | Victoria | 13 November 2003 | Ford Theatre, Geelong Arts Centre, Geelong | —N/a | |
| 2003 | Come On and Party! | Australia | Victoria | 14 November 2003 | Ford Theatre, Geelong Arts Centre, Geelong | —N/a | |
| 2003 | Come On and Party! | Australia | Queensland | 20 November 2003 | Empire Theatre, Toowoomba | 11:30am | |
| 2003 | Come On and Party! | Australia | Queensland | 22 November 2003 | Concert Hall, Queensland Performing Arts Centre, South Bank | —N/a | |
| 2003 | Come On and Party! | Australia | Queensland | 23 November 2003 | Concert Hall, Queensland Performing Arts Centre, South Bank | —N/a | |
| 2003 | Come On and Party! | Australia | New South Wales | 25 November 2003 | Blacktown RSL, Blacktown | —N/a | |
| 2003 | Come On and Party! | Australia | New South Wales | 26 November 2003 | Hills Centre, Castle Hill | —N/a | |
| 2003 | Come On and Party! | Australia | New South Wales | 27 November 2003 | Revesby Workers Club, Revesby | —N/a | |
| 2003 | Come On and Party! | Australia | New South Wales | 28 November 2003 | Revesby Workers Club, Revesby | —N/a | |
| 2003 | Come On and Party! | Singapore | Central Region | 3 December 2003 | Esplanade Theatre, Downtown Core | —N/a | |
| 2003 | Come On and Party! | Singapore | Central Region | 4 December 2003 | Esplanade Theatre, Downtown Core | —N/a | |
| 2003 | Come On and Party! | Malaysia | Kuala Lumpur | December 2003 | Orcavie Sdn Bhd | —N/a | |
| 2003 | Come On and Party! | South Africa | Gauteng | 2003 | Johannesburg Expo Centre, Johannesburg | —N/a | |
| 2004 | Come On and Party! | Australia | Western Australia | 5 January 2004 | Mandurah Performing Arts Centre, Mandurah | —N/a | |
| 2004 | Come On and Party! | Australia | Western Australia | 7 January 2004 | Perth Concert Hall, Perth | 11:30am, 1:30pm, 3:30pm | |
| 2004 | Come On and Party! | Australia | Western Australia | 8 January 2004 | Perth Concert Hall, Perth | 11:30am, 1:30pm, 3:30pm | |
| 2004 | Come On and Party! | Australia | Western Australia | 9 January 2004 | Perth Concert Hall, Perth | 10:00am, 12:00pm, 2:00pm | |
| 2004 | Come On and Party! | Australia | Western Australia | 10 January 2004 | Perth Concert Hall, Perth | 10:00am, 12:00pm, 2:00pm | |
| 2004 | Come On and Party! | Australia | South Australia | 13 January 2004 | Thebarton Theatre, Torrensville (Note: The group performed three shows per day across two days at this venue.) | —N/a | |
| 2004 | Come On and Party! | Australia | South Australia | 14 January 2004 | Thebarton Theatre, Torrensville | —N/a | |
| 2004 | Come On and Party! | Australia | Victoria | 15 January 2004 | Besen Centre, Burwood | 1:00pm, 3:00pm, 5:00pm | |
| 2004 | Come On and Party! | Australia | Victoria | 16 January 2004 | Besen Centre, Burwood | 10:00am, 12:00pm, 2:00pm | |
| 2004 | Come On and Party! | Australia | Victoria | 17 January 2004 | George Wood Performing Arts Centre, Ringwood | —N/a | |
| 2004 | Come On and Party! | Australia | Victoria | 18 January 2004 | George Wood Performing Arts Centre, Ringwood | 10:00am, 12:00pm, 2:00pm | |
| 2004 | Come On and Party! | Australia | Victoria | 20 January 2004 | Hamer Hall, Arts Centre, Melbourne | —N/a | |
| 2004 | Come On and Party! | Australia | Victoria | 21 January 2004 | Hamer Hall, Arts Centre, Melbourne | —N/a | |
| 2004 | Come On and Party! | Australia | Victoria | 22 January 2004 | Hamer Hall, Arts Centre, Melbourne | —N/a | |
| 2004 | Come On and Party! | Australia | Victoria | 23 January 2004 | Hamer Hall, Arts Centre, Melbourne | —N/a | |
| 2004 | Come On and Party! | Australia | Victoria | 24 January 2004 | Hamer Hall, Arts Centre, Melbourne | —N/a | |
| 2004 | Come On and Party! | Australia | Australian Capital Territory | 26 January 2004 | Canberra Theatre, Canberra | 11:30am, 1:30pm, 3:30pm | |
| 2004 | Come On and Party! | Australia | Australian Capital Territory | 27 January 2004 | Canberra Theatre, Canberra | 10:00am, 12:00pm, 2:00pm | |
| 2004 | Hi-5 Alive (Note: The Hi-5 Alive tour was revisited for the United Kingdom. This tour was chosen after the series premiered in the UK in January 2003, and the corresponding album, Boom Boom Beat was released in September 2003. 108 shows were performed on this tour.) | United Kingdom and Ireland | North West England | 13 February 2004 | Manchester Opera House, Manchester | 5:30pm | |
| 2004 | Hi-5 Alive | United Kingdom and Ireland | North West England | 14 February 2004 | Manchester Opera House, Manchester | 10:30am, 1:00pm, 3:30pm | |
| 2004 | Hi-5 Alive | United Kingdom and Ireland | North West England | 15 February 2004 | Manchester Opera House, Manchester | 10:30am, 1:00pm, 3:30pm | |
| 2004 | Hi-5 Alive | United Kingdom and Ireland | South East England | 16 February 2004 | New Theatre Oxford, Oxford | 1:00pm, 3:30pm, 6:00pm | |
| 2004 | Hi-5 Alive | United Kingdom and Ireland | South East England | 17 February 2004 | New Theatre Oxford, Oxford | 10:30am, 1:00pm, 3:30pm | |
| 2004 | Hi-5 Alive | United Kingdom and Ireland | Greater London | 19 February 2004 | Hammersmith Apollo, London (Note: 30,000 tickets were sold in three days for this venue.) | 5:30pm | |
| 2004 | Hi-5 Alive | United Kingdom and Ireland | Greater London | 20 February 2004 | Hammersmith Apollo, London | 10:30am, 1:00pm, 3:30pm | |
| 2004 | Hi-5 Alive | United Kingdom and Ireland | Greater London | 21 February 2004 | Hammersmith Apollo, London | 10:30am, 1:00pm | |
| 2004 | Hi-5 Alive | United Kingdom and Ireland | Greater London | 22 February 2004 | Hammersmith Apollo, London | 10:30am, 1:00pm | |
| 2004 | Hi-5 Alive | United Kingdom and Ireland | South West England | 26 February 2004 | Bristol Hippodrome, Bristol | 1:00pm, 3:30pm, 6:00pm | |
| 2004 | Hi-5 Alive | United Kingdom and Ireland | South West England | 27 February 2004 | Bristol Hippodrome, Bristol | 10:30am, 1:00pm, 3:30pm | |
| 2004 | Hi-5 Alive | United Kingdom and Ireland | South West England | 28 February 2004 | Bristol Hippodrome, Bristol | 10:30am, 1:00pm | |
| 2004 | Hi-5 Alive | United Kingdom and Ireland | Yorkshire and the Humber | 29 February 2004 | Grand Theatre, Leeds | 1:00pm, 3:30pm, 6:00pm | |
| 2004 | Hi-5 Alive | United Kingdom and Ireland | North East England | 2 March 2004 | Newcastle City Hall, Newcastle | 1:00pm, 3:30pm, 6:00pm | |
| 2004 | Hi-5 Alive | United Kingdom and Ireland | North East England | 3 March 2004 | Newcastle City Hall, Newcastle | 10:30am, 1:00pm | |
| 2004 | Hi-5 Alive | United Kingdom and Ireland | East of England | 7 March 2004 | Theatre Royal, Norwich | 1:00pm, 3:30pm, 6:00pm | |
| 2004 | Hi-5 Alive | United Kingdom and Ireland | Yorkshire and the Humber | 8 March 2004 | Grand Opera House, York | 1:00pm, 3:30pm, 6:00pm | |
| 2004 | Hi-5 Alive | United Kingdom and Ireland | Yorkshire and the Humber | 9 March 2004 | Grand Opera House, York | 10:30am, 1:00pm | |
| 2004 | Hi-5 Alive | United Kingdom and Ireland | Ireland | 10 March 2004 | The Helix, Dublin | 3:30pm, 6:00pm | |
| 2004 | Hi-5 Alive | United Kingdom and Ireland | Ireland | 11 March 2004 | The Helix, Dublin | 10:30am, 1:00pm | |
| 2004 | Hi-5 Alive | United Kingdom and Ireland | East Midlands | 13 March 2004 | Grimsby Auditorium, Grimsby | 1:00pm, 3:30pm, 6:00pm | |
| 2004 | Hi-5 Alive | United Kingdom and Ireland | West Midlands | 18 March 2004 | Alexandra Theatre, Birmingham | 1:00pm, 3:30pm, 6:00pm | |
| 2004 | Hi-5 Alive | United Kingdom and Ireland | West Midlands | 19 March 2004 | Alexandra Theatre, Birmingham | 10:30am, 1:00pm, 3:30pm | |
| 2004 | Hi-5 Alive | United Kingdom and Ireland | West Midlands | 20 March 2004 | Alexandra Theatre, Birmingham | 10:30am, 1:00pm | |
| 2004 | Hi-5 Alive | United Kingdom and Ireland | East Midlands | 22 March 2004 | Nottingham Royal Concert Hall | 1:00pm, 3:30pm, 6:00pm | |
| 2004 | Hi-5 Alive | United Kingdom and Ireland | East Midlands | 23 March 2004 | Nottingham Royal Concert Hall | 10:30am, 1:00pm, 3:30pm | |
| 2004 | Hi-5 Alive | United Kingdom and Ireland | East Midlands | 24 March 2004 | Nottingham Royal Concert Hall | 10:30am, 1:00pm | |
| 2004 | Hi-5 Alive | United Kingdom and Ireland | North West England | 26 March 2004 | Liverpool Empire Theatre | 1:00pm, 3:30pm, 6:00pm | |
| 2004 | Hi-5 Alive | United Kingdom and Ireland | North West England | 27 March 2004 | Liverpool Empire Theatre | 10:30am, 1:00pm, 3:30pm | |
| 2004 | Hi-5 Alive | United Kingdom and Ireland | Scotland | 30 March 2004 | Edinburgh Festival Theatre, Edinburgh | 1:00pm, 3:30pm, 6:00pm | |
| 2004 | Hi-5 Alive | United Kingdom and Ireland | Scotland | 31 March 2004 | Edinburgh Festival Theatre, Edinburgh | 1:00pm, 3:30pm, 6:00pm | |
| 2004 | Hi-5 Alive | United Kingdom and Ireland | Scotland | 1 April 2004 | Edinburgh Festival Theatre, Edinburgh | 10:30am, 1:00pm | |
| 2004 | Hi-5 Alive | United Kingdom and Ireland | Wales | 3 April 2004 | St David's Hall, Cardiff | 1:00pm, 3:30pm, 6:00pm | |
| 2004 | Hi-5 Alive | United Kingdom and Ireland | Wales | 4 April 2004 | St David's Hall, Cardiff | 10:30am, 1:00pm | |
| 2005 | Come On and Party! | New Zealand | South Island | 13 January 2005 | Christchurch Town Hall, Christchurch | 11:00am, 1:00pm, 3:00pm | |
| 2005 | Come On and Party! | New Zealand | South Island | 14 January 2005 | Christchurch Town Hall, Christchurch | 11:00am, 1:00pm, 3:00pm | |
| 2005 | Come On and Party! | New Zealand | South Island | 15 January 2005 | Christchurch Town Hall, Christchurch | 11:00am, 1:00pm, 3:00pm | |
| 2005 | Come On and Party! | New Zealand | North Island | 17 January 2005 | Michael Fowler Centre, Wellington | 1:00pm, 3:00pm, 5:00pm | |
| 2005 | Come On and Party! | New Zealand | North Island | 18 January 2005 | Michael Fowler Centre, Wellington | 11:00am, 1:00pm, 3:00pm | |
| 2005 | Come On and Party! | New Zealand | North Island | 19 January 2005 | Michael Fowler Centre, Wellington | 11:00am, 1:00pm, 3:00pm | |
| 2005 | Come On and Party! | New Zealand | North Island | 20 January 2005 | Regent on Broadway, Palmerston North | 11:00am, 1:00pm, 3:00pm | |
| 2005 | Come On and Party! | New Zealand | North Island | 21 January 2005 | TSB Stadium, New Plymouth | 1:00pm, 3:00pm, 5:00pm | |
| 2005 | Come On and Party! | New Zealand | North Island | 23 January 2005 | Napier Municipal Theatre, Napier | 1:00pm, 3:00pm, 5:00pm | |
| 2005 | Come On and Party! | New Zealand | North Island | 24 January 2005 | Napier Municipal Theatre, Napier | 11:00am, 1:00pm, 3:00pm | |
| 2005 | Come On and Party! | New Zealand | North Island | 25 January 2005 | Rotorua Sportsdrome, Rotorua | 1:00pm, 3:00pm, 5:00pm | |
| 2005 | Come On and Party! | New Zealand | North Island | 26 January 2005 | Hamilton Founders Theatre, Hamilton | 11:00am, 1:00pm, 3:00pm | |
| 2005 | Come On and Party! | New Zealand | North Island | 27 January 2005 | Hamilton Founders Theatre, Hamilton | 11:00am | |
| 2005 | Come On and Party! | New Zealand | North Island | 28 January 2005 | ASB Theatre, Aotea Centre, Auckland | 1:00pm, 3:00pm, 5:00pm | |
| 2005 | Come On and Party! | New Zealand | North Island | 29 January 2005 | ASB Theatre, Aotea Centre, Auckland | 11:00am, 1:00pm, 3:00pm | |
| 2005 | Come On and Party! | New Zealand | North Island | 30 January 2005 | ASB Theatre, Aotea Centre, Auckland | 11:00am, 1:00pm, 3:00pm | |
| 2005 | Space Magic (Note: This show ran for 75 to 90 minutes and was the group's "biggest tour ever"; in Australia, the group performed in arena venues. It was presented in two acts, the first about "space" and the second centred on "magic".) | United Kingdom and Ireland | Scotland | 20 March 2005 | Edinburgh Playhouse, Edinburgh | 1:30pm, 4:00pm, 6:30pm | |
| 2005 | Space Magic | United Kingdom and Ireland | North West England | 24 March 2005 | Palace Theatre, Manchester | 4:00pm, 6:30pm | |
| 2005 | Space Magic | United Kingdom and Ireland | North West England | 25 March 2005 | Palace Theatre, Manchester | 1:30pm, 4:00pm, 6:30pm | |
| 2005 | Space Magic | United Kingdom and Ireland | North West England | 26 March 2005 | Palace Theatre, Manchester | 1:30pm, 4:00pm, 6:30pm | |
| 2005 | Space Magic | United Kingdom and Ireland | South West England | 27 March 2005 | Bristol Hippodrome, Bristol | 1:30pm, 3:30pm, 6:30pm | |
| 2005 | Space Magic | United Kingdom and Ireland | East of England | 28 March 2005 | Theatre Royal, Norwich | 1:30pm, 3:30pm, 6:30pm | |
| 2005 | Space Magic | United Kingdom and Ireland | South East England | 30 March 2005 | New Theatre Oxford, Oxford | 1:30pm, 4:00pm, 6:30pm | |
| 2005 | Space Magic | United Kingdom and Ireland | South East England | 30 March 2005 | New Theatre Oxford, Oxford | 1:30pm, 4:00pm, 6:30pm | |
| 2005 | Space Magic | United Kingdom and Ireland | East of England | 1 April 2005 | Cambridge Corn Exchange, Cambridge | 1:30pm, 4:00pm, 6:30pm | |
| 2005 | Space Magic | United Kingdom and Ireland | South East England | 2 April 2005 | Mayflower Theatre, Southampton | 11:00am, 1:30pm, 4:00pm | |
| 2005 | Space Magic | United Kingdom and Ireland | South East England | 3 April 2005 | New Victoria Theatre, Woking | 11:00am, 1:30pm, 4:00pm | |
| 2005 | Space Magic | United Kingdom and Ireland | Yorkshire and the Humber | 5 April 2005 | Futurist Theatre, Scarborough | 1:30pm, 4:00pm, 6:30pm | |
| 2005 | Space Magic | United Kingdom and Ireland | North East England | 6 April 2005 | Newcastle City Hall, Newcastle | 1:30pm, 4:00pm, 6:30pm | |
| 2005 | Space Magic | United Kingdom and Ireland | West Midlands | 7 April 2005 | Alexandra Theatre, Birmingham | 1:30pm, 4:00pm, 6:00pm | |
| 2005 | Space Magic | United Kingdom and Ireland | West Midlands | 8 April 2005 | Alexandra Theatre, Birmingham | 1:30pm, 4:00pm, 6:00pm | |
| 2005 | Space Magic | United Kingdom and Ireland | West Midlands | 9 April 2005 | Alexandra Theatre, Birmingham | 11:00am, 1:30pm | |
| 2005 | Space Magic | United Kingdom and Ireland | Wales | 10 April 2005 | St David's Hall, Cardiff | 1:00pm, 3:30pm, 6:00pm | |
| 2005 | Space Magic | United Kingdom and Ireland | Ireland | 12 April 2005 | The Helix, Dublin | 11:00am, 6:00pm | |
| 2005 | Space Magic | United Kingdom and Ireland | Ireland | 13 April 2005 | The Helix, Dublin | 11:00am, 6:00pm | |
| 2005 | Space Magic | United Kingdom and Ireland | Ireland | 14 April 2005 | The Helix, Dublin | 11:00am, 6:00pm | |
| 2005 | Space Magic | United Kingdom and Ireland | North West England | 16 April 2005 | Empire Theatre, Liverpool | 11:00am, 1:30pm, 4:00pm | |
| 2005 | Space Magic | United Kingdom and Ireland | North West England | 17 April 2005 | Empire Theatre, Liverpool | 11:00am, 1:30pm, 4:00pm | |
| 2005 | Space Magic | United Kingdom and Ireland | West Midlands | 19 April 2005 | Regent Theatre, Stoke-on-Trent | 4:00pm, 6:30pm | |
| 2005 | Space Magic | United Kingdom and Ireland | East Midlands | 20 April 2005 | Theatre Royal, Nottingham | 1:30pm, 4:00pm, 6:30pm | |
| 2005 | Space Magic | United Kingdom and Ireland | Yorkshire and the Humber | 21 April 2005 | Grand Opera House, York | 11:00am, 1:30pm, 4:00pm | |
| 2005 | Space Magic | United Kingdom and Ireland | Scotland | 24 April 2005 | King's Theatre, Glasgow | 11:00am, 1:30pm, 4:00pm | |
| 2005 | Space Magic | United Kingdom and Ireland | South East England | 25 April 2005 | Milton Keynes Theatre, Milton Keynes | 6:30pm | |
| 2005 | Space Magic | United Kingdom and Ireland | South East England | 26 April 2005 | Milton Keynes Theatre, Milton Keynes | 1:30pm, 4:00pm, 6:30pm | |
| 2005 | Space Magic | United Kingdom and Ireland | Greater London | 29 April 2005 | Hammersmith Apollo, London | 1:30pm, 4:00pm, 6:30pm | |
| 2005 | Space Magic | United Kingdom and Ireland | Greater London | 30 April 2005 | Hammersmith Apollo, London | 1:30pm, 4:00pm, 6:30pm | |
| 2005 | Space Magic | United Kingdom and Ireland | Greater London | 1 May 2005 | Hammersmith Apollo, London | 11:00am, 1:30pm, 4:00pm | |
| 2005 | Space Magic | United Kingdom and Ireland | East Midlands | 3 May 2005 | De Montfort Hall, Leicester | 1:30pm, 4:00pm, 6:30pm | |
| 2005 | Space Magic | United Kingdom and Ireland | East of England | 4 May 2005 | Cliffs Pavilion, Southend | 1:30pm, 4:00pm, 6:30pm | |
| 2005 | Space Magic | United Kingdom and Ireland | East of England | 5 May 2005 | Cliffs Pavilion, Southend | 1:30pm, 4:00pm, 6:30pm | |
| 2005 | Space Magic | Singapore | East Region | 28 May 2005 | Singapore Expo, Tampines | 1:30pm, 4:00pm, 7:30pm | |
| 2005 | Space Magic | Singapore | East Region | 29 May 2005 | Singapore Expo, Tampines | 1:30pm, 4:00pm, 7:30pm | |
| 2005 | Space Magic | Singapore | East Region | 30 May 2005 | Singapore Expo, Tampines | 1:30pm, 4:00pm, 7:30pm | |
| 2005 | Space Magic | Singapore | East Region | 31 May 2005 | Singapore Expo, Tampines | 1:30pm, 4:00pm, 7:30pm | |
| 2005 | Space Magic | Singapore | East Region | 2 June 2005 | Singapore Expo, Tampines | 1:30pm, 4:00pm, 7:30pm | |
| 2005 | Space Magic | Singapore | East Region | 3 June 2005 | Singapore Expo, Tampines | 1:30pm, 4:00pm, 7:30pm | |
| 2005 | Space Magic | Singapore | East Region | 4 June 2005 | Singapore Expo, Tampines | 1:30pm, 4:00pm, 7:30pm | |
| 2005 | Space Magic | Singapore | East Region | 5 June 2005 | Singapore Expo, Tampines | 1:30pm, 4:00pm | |
| 2005 | Space Magic | Australia | South Australia | 13 November 2005 | Adelaide Entertainment Centre, Adelaide | —N/a | |
| 2005 | Space Magic | Australia | Victoria | 17 November 2005 | Palais Theatre, Melbourne | —N/a | |
| 2005 | Space Magic | Australia | Victoria | 18 November 2005 | Palais Theatre, Melbourne | —N/a | |
| 2005 | Space Magic | Australia | Victoria | 19 November 2005 | Palais Theatre, Melbourne | —N/a | |
| 2005 | Space Magic | Australia | Victoria | 20 November 2005 | Palais Theatre, Melbourne | —N/a | |
| 2005 | Space Magic | Australia | Australian Capital Territory | 22 November 2005 | AIS Arena, Canberra | —N/a | |
| 2005 | Space Magic | Australia | New South Wales | 25 November 2005 | Sydney Super Dome, Sydney | —N/a | |
| 2005 | Space Magic | Australia | New South Wales | 26 November 2005 | Sydney Super Dome, Sydney | —N/a | |
| 2005 | Space Magic | Australia | New South Wales | 27 November 2005 | Sydney Super Dome, Sydney | —N/a | |
| 2005 | Space Magic | Australia | New South Wales | 28 November 2005 | Wollongong Entertainment Centre, Wollongong | 11:30am, 2:00pm | |
| 2005 | Space Magic | Australia | Queensland | 30 November 2005 | Empire Theatre, Toowoomba | 11:30am, 2:00pm, 4:30pm | |
| 2005 | Space Magic | Australia | Queensland | 1 December 2005 | Gold Coast Convention and Exhibition Centre, Gold Coast | 12:00pm, 3:00pm | |
| 2005 | Space Magic | Australia | Queensland | 2 December 2005 | Brisbane Entertainment Centre, Brisbane | 12:30pm | |
| 2005 | Space Magic | Australia | Queensland | 3 December 2005 | Brisbane Entertainment Centre, Brisbane | 10:00am, 1:00pm | |
| 2005 | Space Magic | Australia | New South Wales | 4 December 2005 | Newcastle Entertainment Centre, Newcastle | 11:30am, 2:00pm, 4:30pm | |
| 2005 | Space Magic | Australia | Western Australia | 7 December 2005 | Mandurah Performing Arts Centre, Mandurah | 11:30am, 2:00pm, 4:30pm | |
| 2005 | Space Magic | Australia | Western Australia | 8 December 2005 | Burswood Dome, Perth | 11:30am, 2:30pm | |
| 2005 | Space Magic | Australia | Western Australia | 9 December 2005 | Burswood Dome, Perth | 10:00am, 1:00pm | |
| 2006 | Space Magic | New Zealand (Note: The group performed across 11 cities in New Zealand in January 2006.) | North Island | 12 January 2006 | Civic Theatre, Auckland | —N/a | |
| 2006 | Live Action Heroes | South Africa | Gauteng | March 2006 | Johannesburg Expo Centre, Johannesburg | —N/a | |
| 2006 | Live Action Heroes | United Kingdom and Ireland (Note: Kathleen de Leon Jones was pregnant on this tour; Sun Park was first employed as a stand-by performer.) | North West England | 18 March 2006 | The Lowry, Salford Quays, Salford | 1:30pm, 4:00pm | |
| 2006 | Live Action Heroes | United Kingdom and Ireland | North West England | 19 March 2006 | The Lowry, Salford Quays, Salford | 11:00am, 1:30pm | |
| 2006 | Live Action Heroes | United Kingdom and Ireland | East Midlands | 22 March 2006 | Derby Assembly Rooms, Derby | 4:00pm, 6:30pm | |
| 2006 | Live Action Heroes | United Kingdom and Ireland | North West England | 23 March 2006 | Opera House, Blackpool | 4:00pm, 6:30pm | |
| 2006 | Live Action Heroes | United Kingdom and Ireland | Yorkshire and the Humber | 24 March 2006 | St George's Hall, Bradford | 4:00pm, 6:30pm | |
| 2006 | Live Action Heroes | United Kingdom and Ireland | Yorkshire and the Humber | 25 March 2006 | St George's Hall, Bradford | 1:30pm, 4:00pm | |
| 2006 | Live Action Heroes | United Kingdom and Ireland | Ireland | 27 March 2006 | Olympia Theatre, Dublin | 4:00pm, 6:30pm | |
| 2006 | Live Action Heroes | United Kingdom and Ireland | Ireland | 28 March 2006 | Olympia Theatre, Dublin | 4:00pm, 6:30pm | |
| 2006 | Live Action Heroes | United Kingdom and Ireland | Ireland | 29 March 2006 | Olympia Theatre, Dublin | 4:00pm, 6:30pm | |
| 2006 | Live Action Heroes | United Kingdom and Ireland | Ireland | 30 March 2006 | Olympia Theatre, Dublin | 4:00pm, 6:30pm | |
| 2006 | Live Action Heroes | United Kingdom and Ireland | Ireland | 31 March 2006 | Olympia Theatre, Dublin | 4:00pm, 6:30pm | |
| 2006 | Live Action Heroes | United Kingdom and Ireland | Ireland | 1 April 2006 | INEC, Killarney | 4:00pm, 6:30pm | |
| 2006 | Live Action Heroes | United Kingdom and Ireland | Ireland | 2 April 2006 | INEC, Killarney | 4:00pm, 6:30pm | |
| 2006 | Live Action Heroes | United Kingdom and Ireland | East of England | 4 April 2006 | Theatre Royal, Norwich | 1:30pm, 4:00pm, 6:30pm | |
| 2006 | Live Action Heroes | United Kingdom and Ireland | East of England | 5 April 2005 | Cambridge Corn Exchange, Cambridge | 1:30pm, 4:00pm | |
| 2006 | Live Action Heroes | United Kingdom and Ireland | Greater London | 7 April 2006 | Hammersmith Apollo, London | 1:30pm, 4:00pm | |
| 2006 | Live Action Heroes | United Kingdom and Ireland | Greater London | 8 April 2006 | Hammersmith Apollo, London | 1:30pm, 4:00pm | |
| 2006 | Live Action Heroes | United Kingdom and Ireland | Greater London | 9 April 2006 | Hammersmith Apollo, London | 1:30pm, 4:00pm | |
| 2006 | Live Action Heroes | United Kingdom and Ireland | South East England | 11 April 2006 | Assembly Hall Theatre, Tunbridge Wells | 1:30pm, 4:00pm, 6:30pm | |
| 2006 | Live Action Heroes | United Kingdom and Ireland | South West England | 12 April 2006 | Pavilion Theatre, Bournemouth | 4:00pm, 6:30pm | |
| 2006 | Live Action Heroes | United Kingdom and Ireland | South West England | 13 April 2006 | Pavilion Theatre, Bournemouth | 4:00pm, 6:30pm | |
| 2006 | Live Action Heroes | United Kingdom and Ireland | South East England | 15 April 2006 | The Hexagon, Reading | 11:00am, 1:30pm, 4:00pm | |
| 2006 | Live Action Heroes | United Kingdom and Ireland | South West England | 16 April 2006 | Bristol Hippodrome, Bristol | 11:00am, 1:30pm, 4:00pm | |
| 2006 | Live Action Heroes | United Kingdom and Ireland | South West England | 17 April 2006 | Princess Theatre, Torquay | 4:00pm, 6:00pm | |
| 2006 | Live Action Heroes | United Kingdom and Ireland | Wales | 18 April 2006 | St David's Hall, Cardiff | 4:00pm, 6:30pm | |
| 2006 | Live Action Heroes | United Kingdom and Ireland | Wales | 20 April 2006 | North Wales Theatre, Llandudno | 1:30pm, 4:00pm | |
| 2006 | Live Action Heroes | United Kingdom and Ireland | Wales | 21 April 2006 | North Wales Theatre, Llandudno | 1:30pm, 4:00pm | |
| 2006 | Live Action Heroes | United Kingdom and Ireland | West Midlands | 22 April 2006 | Victoria Theatre, Stoke-on-Trent | 1:30pm, 4:00pm | |
| 2006 | Live Action Heroes | United Kingdom and Ireland | South East England | 23 April 2006 | Mayflower Theatre, Southampton | 12:30pm, 3:00pm, 5:30pm | |
| 2006 | Live Action Heroes | United Kingdom and Ireland | East Midlands | 25 April 2006 | Grimsby Auditorium, Grimsby | 3:30pm, 6:00pm | |
| 2006 | Live Action Heroes | United Kingdom and Ireland | Yorkshire and the Humber | 26 April 2006 | Grand Opera House, York | 1:30pm, 4:00pm | |
| 2006 | Live Action Heroes | United Kingdom and Ireland | West Midlands | 29 April 2006 | Alexandra Theatre, Birmingham | 1:30pm, 4:00pm | |
| 2006 | Live Action Heroes | United Kingdom and Ireland | Scotland | 30 April 2006 | Royal Concert Hall, Glasgow | 1:30pm, 4:00pm | |
| 2006 | Live Action Heroes | United Kingdom and Ireland | North West England | 1 May 2006 | Empire Theatre, Liverpool | 1:30pm, 4:00pm | |
| 2006 | Live Action Heroes | Singapore | East Region | 27 May 2006 | Hall 3, Singapore Expo, Tampines | 1:30pm, 4:00pm, 7:30pm | |
| 2006 | Live Action Heroes | Singapore | East Region | 28 May 2006 | Hall 3, Singapore Expo, Tampines | 1:30pm, 4:00pm, 7:30pm | |
| 2006 | Live Action Heroes | Singapore | East Region | 29 May 2006 | Hall 3, Singapore Expo, Tampines | 4:00pm, 7:30pm | |
| 2006 | Live Action Heroes | Singapore | East Region | 30 May 2006 | Hall 3, Singapore Expo, Tampines | 4:00pm, 7:30pm | |
| 2006 | Live Action Heroes | Singapore | East Region | 1 June 2006 | Hall 3, Singapore Expo, Tampines | 4:00pm, 7:30pm | |
| 2006 | Live Action Heroes | Singapore | East Region | 2 June 2006 | Hall 3, Singapore Expo, Tampines | 4:00pm, 7:30pm | |
| 2006 | Live Action Heroes | Singapore | East Region | 3 June 2006 | Hall 3, Singapore Expo, Tampines | 1:30pm, 4:00pm, 7:30pm | |
| 2006 | Live Action Heroes | Singapore | East Region | 4 June 2006 | Hall 3, Singapore Expo, Tampines | 1:30pm, 4:00pm | |
| 2006 | Live Action Heroes | Australia | New South Wales | 21 October 2006 | Sydney Super Dome, Sydney | 12:45pm, 3:30pm | |
| 2006 | Live Action Heroes | Australia | New South Wales | 22 October 2006 | Sydney Super Dome, Sydney | 12:45pm, 3:30pm | |
| 2006 | Live Action Heroes | Australia | South Australia | 25 October 2006 | Adelaide Entertainment Centre, Adelaide | —N/a | |
| 2006 | Live Action Heroes | Australia | Western Australia | 28 October 2006 | Burswood Dome, Perth | 11:00am, 2:30pm | |
| 2006 | Live Action Heroes | Australia | Western Australia | 29 October 2006 | Burswood Dome, Perth | 1:30pm,4:30pm | |
| 2006 | Live Action Heroes | Australia | Western Australia | 30 October 2006 | Mandurah Performing Arts Centre, Mandurah | 11:30am, 2:00pm, 4:30pm | |
| 2006 | Live Action Heroes | Australia | Queensland | 4 November 2006 | Empire Theatre, Toowoomba | 11:30am, 2:00pm, 4:30pm | |
| 2006 | Live Action Heroes | Australia | Queensland | 6 November 2006 | Brisbane Entertainment Centre, Brisbane | 11:30am, 2:00pm, 4:30pm | |
| 2006 | Live Action Heroes | Australia | Queensland | 8 November 2006 | Gold Coast Convention and Exhibition Centre, Gold Coast | —N/a | |
| 2006 | Live Action Heroes | Australia | New South Wales | 11 November 2006 | Newcastle Entertainment Centre, Newcastle | 11:30am, 2:00pm, 4:30pm | |
| 2006 | Live Action Heroes | Australia | New South Wales | 12 November 2006 | Wollongong Entertainment Centre, Wollongong | 2:00pm, 4:30pm | |
| 2006 | Live Action Heroes | Australia | Australian Capital Territory | 14 November 2006 | AIS Arena, Canberra | —N/a | |
| 2006 | Live Action Heroes | Australia | Victoria | 17 November 2006 | John Cain Arena, Melbourne | 4:30pm | |
| 2006 | Live Action Heroes | Australia | Victoria | 18 November 2006 | John Cain Arena, Melbourne | 10:00am, 12:45pm, 3:30pm | |
| 2006 | Live Action Heroes | Australia | Victoria | 19 November 2006 | John Cain Arena, Melbourne | 10:00am, 12:45pm, 3:30pm | |
| 2007 | Live Action Heroes | New Zealand | North Island | 11 April 2007 | Civic Theatre, Auckland | 10:30am, 1:00pm, 3:00pm | |
| 2007 | Live Action Heroes | New Zealand | North Island | 14 April 2007 | Hamilton Founders Theatre, Hamilton | 10:00am, 12:30pm | |
| 2007 | Live Action Heroes | New Zealand | North Island | 16 April 2007 | Regent on Broadway, Palmerston North | 10:00am, 12:30pm | |
| 2007 | Live Action Heroes | New Zealand | North Island | 17 April 2007 | Hastings Performing Arts Centre, Hastings | 12:30pm, 3:00pm | |
| 2007 | Live Action Heroes | New Zealand | North Island | 19 April 2007 | St. James Theatre, Wellington | 10:00am, 12:30pm | |
| 2007 | Live Action Heroes | New Zealand | South Island | 22 April 2007 | Christchurch Town Hall, Christchurch | 12:30pm, 3:00pm | |
| 2007 | Live Action Heroes | New Zealand | South Island | 24 April 2007 | Dunedin Town Hall, Dunedin | 1:00pm, 3:30pm | |
| 2007 | Live Action Heroes | New Zealand | South Island | 25 April 2007 | Stadium Southland, Invercargill | 1:00pm, 3:30pm | |
| 2007 | The Hi-5 Circus Stage Show | Singapore | East Region | 31 August 2007 (Note: Tour dates inclusive.) | Hall 3, Singapore Expo, Tampines | —N/a | |
| 2007 | The Hi-5 Circus Stage Show | Singapore | East Region | 9 September 2007 | Hall 3, Singapore Expo, Tampines | —N/a | |
| 2008 | The Hi-5 Circus Stage Show | Australia | New South Wales | 5 January 2008 | Sydney Super Dome, Sydney | 11:30am, 2:30pm | |
| 2008 | The Hi-5 Circus Stage Show | Australia | New South Wales | 6 January 2008 | Sydney Super Dome, Sydney | 11:30am, 2:30pm | |
| 2008 | The Hi-5 Circus Stage Show | Australia | Australian Capital Territory | 9 January 2008 | Royal Theatre, National Convention Centre, Canberra | 2:00pm | |
| 2008 | The Hi-5 Circus Stage Show | Australia | Victoria | 11 January 2008 | Hamer Hall, Arts Centre, Melbourne | 2:00pm, 5:00pm | |
| 2008 | The Hi-5 Circus Stage Show | Australia | Victoria | 12 January 2008 | Hamer Hall, Arts Centre, Melbourne | 11:30am, 2:30pm | |
| 2008 | The Hi-5 Circus Stage Show | Australia | Victoria | 13 January 2008 | Hamer Hall, Arts Centre, Melbourne | 11:30am, 2:30pm | |
| 2008 | The Hi-5 Circus Stage Show | Australia | New South Wales | 18 January 2008 | Newcastle Entertainment Centre, Newcastle | 11:30am, 2:00pm | |
| 2008 | The Hi-5 Circus Stage Show | Australia | New South Wales | 19 January 2008 | Wollongong Entertainment Centre, Wollongong | 11:30am, 2:00pm | |
| 2008 | The Hi-5 Circus Stage Show | Australia | Queensland | 21 January 2008 | Brisbane Convention & Exhibition Centre, Brisbane | 11:30am, 2:30pm | |
| 2008 | The Hi-5 Circus Stage Show | Australia | Queensland | 22 January 2008 | Gold Coast Convention and Exhibition Centre, Gold Coast | 11:30am, 3:00pm | |
| 2008 | The Hi-5 Circus Stage Show | Australia | South Australia | 24 January 2008 | Adelaide Entertainment Centre, Adelaide | 11:30am, 2:00pm | |
| 2008 | The Hi-5 Circus Stage Show | Australia | Western Australia | 27 January 2008 | Perth Convention and Exhibition Centre, Perth | 2:00pm, 4:30pm | |
| 2008 | The Hi-5 Circus Stage Show | Australia | Western Australia | 28 January 2008 | Perth Convention and Exhibition Centre, Perth | 11:30am, 2:30pm | |
| 2008 | Party Street (Note: This was a tour to regional locations; the first leg toured northern New South Wales and Queensland and the second leg toured Victoria, Tasmania and southern New South Wales. The tour was performed in clubs and small theatres, and was a shortened version of previous shows such as the Hi-5 Circus Stage Show; the running time for the show was 40 minutes.) | Australia | Queensland | 6 April 2008 | Brothers Leagues Club, Cairns | 10:30am, 2:00pm | |
| 2008 | Party Street | Australia | Queensland | 7 April 2008 | Brothers Leagues Club, Cairns | 10:30am, 1:30pm | |
| 2008 | Party Street | Australia | Queensland | 8 April 2008 | Civic Theatre, Townsville | 10:30am, 12:30pm | |
| 2008 | Party Street | Australia | Queensland | 9 April 2008 | Mackay Entertainment Centre, Mackay | 10:30am, 12:30pm | |
| 2008 | Party Street | Australia | Queensland | 10 April 2008 | Pilbeam Theatre, Rockhampton | 10:30am, 12:30pm | |
| 2008 | Party Street | Australia | Queensland | 13 April 2008 | Brolga Theatre, Maryborough | 10:30am, 12:30pm | |
| 2008 | Party Street | Australia | New South Wales | 15 April 2008 | Lismore Workers Club, Lismore | 10:30am, 12:30pm | |
| 2008 | Party Street | Australia | New South Wales | 16 April 2008 | Grafton Ex Services Club, Grafton | 10:30am, 12:30pm | |
| 2008 | Party Street | Australia | New South Wales | 17 April 2008 | Coffs Ex Services Club, Coffs Harbour | 10:30am, 12:30pm | |
| 2008 | Party Street | Australia | New South Wales | 19 April 2008 | Armidale Ex Services Club, Armidale | 10:30am, 12:30pm | |
| 2008 | Party Street | Australia | New South Wales | 20 April 2008 | West Tamworth Leagues Club, Tamworth | 10:30am, 12:30pm | |
| 2008 | Party Street | Australia | New South Wales | 21 April 2008 | Port Macquarie Panthers, Port Macquarie | 10:30am, 12:30pm | |
| 2008 | Party Street | Australia | New South Wales | 22 April 2008 | Club Forster, Forster | 10:30am, 12:30pm | |
| 2008 | Party Street | Australia | New South Wales | 24 April 2008 | Dubbo Civic Centre, Dubbo | 10:30am, 12:30pm | |
| 2008 | Party Street | Australia | New South Wales | 27 April 2008 | Orange Ex-Services Club, Orange | 10:30am, 12:30pm | |
| 2008 | Party Street | Australia | New South Wales | 28 April 2008 | Bathurst Memorial Entertainment Centre, Bathurst | 10:30am, 12:30pm | |
| 2008 | Party Street | Australia | New South Wales | 30 April 2008 | Evan Theatre, Penrith Panthers, Penrith | 10:30am, 12:30pm | |
| 2008 | Party Street | Australia | New South Wales | 1 May 2008 | Evan Theatre, Penrith Panthers, Penrith | 10:30am, 12:30pm | |
| 2008 | Party Street | Australia | Victoria | 1 July 2008 | Ford Theatre, Geelong Arts Centre, Geelong | 10:30am, 12:30pm, 2:00pm | |
| 2008 | Party Street | Australia | Victoria | 2 July 2008 | Wendouree Centre for the Performing Arts, Ballarat | 10:30am, 12:30pm | |
| 2008 | Party Street | Australia | Victoria | 4 July 2008 | Warragul Arts Centre, Warragul | 10:30am, 12:30pm, 2:00pm | |
| 2008 | Party Street | Australia | Victoria | 6 July 2008 | Fun 4 Kids Festival, Warrnambool | 10:30am, 12:30pm | |
| 2008 | Party Street | Australia | Victoria | 9 July 2008 | Riverlinks Theatre, Shepparton | 10:30am, 12:30pm | |
| 2008 | Party Street | Australia | Victoria | 10 July 2008 | Swan Hill Town Hall, Swan Hill | 10:30am, 12:30pm | |
| 2008 | Party Street | Australia | Victoria | 11 July 2008 | The Capital Theatre, Bendigo | 10:30am, 12:30pm, 2:00pm | |
| 2008 | Party Street | Australia | Tasmania | 14 July 2008 | Theatre Royal, Hobart | 10:30am, 12:30pm | |
| 2008 | Party Street | Australia | Tasmania | 15 July 2008 | Theatre Royal, Hobart | 10:30am, 12:30pm | |
| 2008 | Party Street | Australia | Tasmania | 16 July 2008 | Princess Theatre, Launceston | 10:30am, 12:30pm | |
| 2008 | Party Street | Australia | Tasmania | 17 July 2008 | Devonport Entertainment and Convention Centre, Devonport | 10:30am, 12:30pm | |
| 2008 | Party Street | Australia | New South Wales | 21 July 2008 | Albury Performing Arts Centre, Albury | 10:30am, 12:30pm | |
| 2008 | Party Street | Australia | New South Wales | 22 July 2008 | Wagga Wagga Showground, Wagga Wagga | 10:30am, 12:30pm | |
| 2008 | Party Street | Australia | New South Wales | 23 July 2008 | Griffith Ex-Servicemen's Club, Griffith | 10:30am, 12:30pm | |
| 2008 | Party Street | Australia | New South Wales | 25 July 2008 | Goulburn Workers Club, Goulburn | 10:30am, 12:30pm | |
| 2008 | Party Street | Australia | New South Wales | 27 July 2008 | The Cube, Campbelltown Convention and Entertainment Centre, Campbelltown | 10:30am, 12:30pm | |
| 2008 | Party Street | Australia | New South Wales | 28 July 2008 | Revesby Workers Club, Revesby | 10:30am, 12:30pm | |
| 2008 | Party Street | Australia | New South Wales | 29 July 2008 | Hornsby RSL Club, Hornsby | 10:30am, 12:30pm | |
| 2008 | Party Street | Australia | New South Wales | 30 July 2008 | Mingara Recreation Club, Tumbi Umbi | 10:30am, 12:30pm | |
| 2008 | The Hi-5 Circus Stage Show | New Zealand | South Island | 27 September 2008 | Stadium Southland, Invercargill | 10:00am | |
| 2008 | The Hi-5 Circus Stage Show | New Zealand | South Island | 29 September 2008 | Regent Theatre, Dunedin | 10:00am | |
| 2008 | The Hi-5 Circus Stage Show | New Zealand | South Island | 1 October 2008 | Christchurch Arena, Christchurch | 10:00am, 12:30pm | |
| 2008 | The Hi-5 Circus Stage Show | New Zealand | North Island | 3 October 2008 | Michael Fowler Centre, Wellington | 3:00pm | |
| 2008 | The Hi-5 Circus Stage Show | New Zealand | North Island | 4 October 2008 | Michael Fowler Centre, Wellington | 10:00am, 12:30pm | |
| 2008 | The Hi-5 Circus Stage Show | New Zealand | North Island | 6 October 2008 | Regent on Broadway, Palmerston North | 10:00am, 12:30pm | |
| 2008 | The Hi-5 Circus Stage Show | New Zealand | North Island | 8 October 2008 | Hamilton Founders Theatre, Hamilton | 10:00am, 12:30pm | |
| 2008 | The Hi-5 Circus Stage Show | New Zealand | North Island | 9 October 2008 | Hamilton Founders Theatre, Hamilton | 10:00am | |
| 2008 | The Hi-5 Circus Stage Show | New Zealand | North Island | 11 October 2008 | Aotea Centre, Auckland | 12:30pm, 3:00pm | |
| 2008 | The Hi-5 Circus Stage Show | New Zealand | North Island | 12 October 2008 | Aotea Centre, Auckland | 10:00am, 12:30pm | |
| 2008 | Playtime! | Australia | New South Wales | 25 October 2008 | Newcastle Entertainment Centre, Newcastle | 10:00am, 1:00pm | |
| 2008 | Playtime! | Australia | New South Wales | 28 October 2008 | Wollongong Entertainment Centre, Wollongong | 10:00am, 1:00pm | |
| 2008 | Playtime! | Australia | Western Australia | 2 November 2008 | Burswood Dome, Perth | —N/a | |
| 2008 | Playtime! | Australia | Western Australia | 3 November 2008 | Burswood Dome, Perth | —N/a | |
| 2008 | Playtime! | Australia | Australian Capital Territory | 9 November 2008 | Royal Theatre, National Convention Centre, Canberra | —N/a | |
| 2008 | Playtime! | Australia | Queensland | 11 November 2008 | Brisbane Entertainment Centre, Brisbane | 10:00am, 1:00pm | |
| 2008 | Playtime! | Australia | Queensland | 12 November 2008 | Gold Coast Convention and Exhibition Centre, Gold Coast | —N/a | |
| 2008 | Playtime! | Australia | Victoria | 15 November 2008 | Rod Laver Arena, Melbourne | 10:00am, 1:00pm | |
| 2008 | Playtime! | Australia | Victoria | 16 November 2008 | Rod Laver Arena, Melbourne | 10:00am, 1:00pm | |
| 2008 | Playtime! | Australia | South Australia | 18 November 2008 | Adelaide Entertainment Centre, Adelaide | 10:00am, 1:00pm | |
| 2008 | Playtime! | Australia | New South Wales | 22 November 2008 | Sydney Super Dome, Sydney | 10:00am, 1:00pm | |
| 2008 | Playtime! | Australia | New South Wales | 23 November 2008 | Sydney Super Dome, Sydney | 10:00am, 1:00pm | |
| 2009 | Hi-5 Surprise! | Malaysia | Pahang | 29 August 2009 | Arena of Stars, Genting Highlands | 3:00pm, 7:00pm | |
| 2009 | Hi-5 Surprise! | Malaysia | Pahang | 30 August 2009 | Arena of Stars, Genting Highlands | 3:00pm, 7:00pm | |
| 2009 | Hi-5 Surprise! | Malaysia | Pahang | 31 August 2009 | Arena of Stars, Genting Highlands | 12:00pm, 4:00pm | |
| 2009 | Hi-5 Surprise! | Singapore | Central Region | 8 September 2009 | Singapore Indoor Stadium, Kallang | —N/a | |
| 2009 | Hi-5 Surprise! | Singapore | Central Region | 13 September 2009 | Singapore Indoor Stadium, Kallang | —N/a | |
| 2009 | Hi-5 Surprise! | Philippines | Manila | 25 November 2009 | Megatent, Meralco Avenue, Ortigas Center, Pasig | 3:00pm, 6:00pm | |
| 2009 | Hi-5 Surprise! | Philippines | Manila | 26 November 2009 | Megatent, Meralco Avenue, Ortigas Center, Pasig | 11:00am, 3:00pm, 6:00pm | |
| 2009 | Hi-5 Surprise! | Philippines | Manila | 27 November 2009 | Megatent, Meralco Avenue, Ortigas Center, Pasig | 11:00am, 3:00pm, 6:00pm | |
| 2009 | Hi-5 Surprise! | Philippines | Manila | 28 November 2009 | Megatent, Meralco Avenue, Ortigas Center, Pasig | 11:00am, 3:00pm, 6:00pm | |
| 2009 | Hi-5 Surprise! | Philippines | Manila | 29 November 2009 | Megatent, Meralco Avenue, Ortigas Center, Pasig | 11:00am, 3:00pm, 6:00pm | |
| 2009 | Hi-5 Surprise! | Philippines | Manila | 30 November 2009 | Megatent, Meralco Avenue, Ortigas Center, Pasig | 11:00am, 3:00pm, 6:00pm | |
| 2010 | Hi-5 Surprise! | Australia | Victoria | 5 January 2010 | Playhouse, Arts Centre, Melbourne | 10:00am, 12:00pm, 2:30pm | |
| 2010 | Hi-5 Surprise! | Australia | Victoria | 6 January 2010 | Playhouse, Arts Centre, Melbourne | 10:00am, 12:00pm, 2:30pm | |
| 2010 | Hi-5 Surprise! | Australia | Victoria | 7 January 2010 | Playhouse, Arts Centre, Melbourne | 10:00am, 12:00pm, 2:30pm | |
| 2010 | Hi-5 Surprise! | Australia | Victoria | 8 January 2010 | Playhouse, Arts Centre, Melbourne | 10:00am, 12:00pm, 2:30pm | |
| 2010 | Hi-5 Surprise! | Australia | New South Wales | 12 January 2010 | Theatre Royal, Sydney | —N/a | |
| 2010 | Hi-5 Surprise! | Australia | New South Wales | 13 January 2010 | Theatre Royal, Sydney | —N/a | |
| 2010 | Hi-5 Surprise! | Australia | New South Wales | 14 January 2010 | Theatre Royal, Sydney | —N/a | |
| 2010 | Hi-5 Surprise! | Australia | Victoria | 19 January 2010 | Wendouree Centre for the Performing Arts, Ballarat | 11:30am, 2:00pm | |
| 2010 | Hi-5 Surprise! | Australia | Victoria | 20 January 2010 | Plenty Ranges Arts & Convention Centre, South Morang | 11:30am | |
| 2010 | Hi-5 Surprise! | Australia | Victoria | 21 January 2010 | George Wood Performing Arts Centre, Ringwood | 11:30am, 2:00pm | |
| 2010 | Hi-5 Surprise! | Australia | Victoria | 22 January 2010 | Costa Hall, Deakin University, Geelong | 11:30am, 2:00pm | |
| 2010 | Hi-5 Surprise! | Australia | Victoria | 23 January 2010 | Drum Theatre, Dandenong | 11:30am, 2:00pm | |
| 2010 | Hi-5 Surprise! | Australia | Victoria | 25 January 2010 | Eastbank Centre, Shepparton | 11:30am, 2:00pm | |
| 2010 | Hi-5 Surprise! | Australia | Victoria | 27 January 2010 | Frankston Arts Centre, Frankston | 11:30am, 2:00pm | |
| 2010 | Hi-5 Surprise! | Australia | South Australia | 29 January 2010 | Adelaide Festival Centre, Adelaide | 2:00pm | |
| 2010 | Hi-5 Surprise! | Australia | South Australia | 30 January 2010 | Adelaide Festival Centre, Adelaide | 10.00am, 12:00pm | |
| 2010 | Hi-5 Surprise! | Australia | New South Wales | 2 March 2010 | Penrith Panthers, Penrith | 10:00am, 1:00pm | |
| 2010 | Hi-5 Surprise! | Australia | New South Wales | 3 March 2010 | Hornsby RSL Club, Hornsby | 11.30am, 2:00pm | |
| 2010 | Hi-5 Surprise! | Australia | Queensland | 5 March 2010 | Lyric Theatre, Queensland Performing Arts Centre, South Bank | —N/a | |
| 2010 | Hi-5 Surprise! | Australia | Queensland | 6 March 2010 | Lyric Theatre, Queensland Performing Arts Centre, South Bank | —N/a | |
| 2010 | Hi-5 Surprise! | Australia | New South Wales | 9 March 2010 | Revesby Workers Club, Revesby | 11.00am, 1:30pm | |
| 2010 | Hi-5 Surprise! | Australia | New South Wales | 10 March 2010 | Canterbury Hurlstone Park RSL, Hurlstone Park | 11.30am, 2:00pm | |
| 2010 | Hi-5 Surprise! | Australia | New South Wales | 11 March 2010 | Mount Pritchard Mounties, Mount Pritchard | —N/a | |
| 2010 | Hi-5 Surprise! | Australia | Australian Capital Territory | 13 March 2010 | Canberra Theatre, Canberra | 11:30am, 2:00pm | |
| 2010 | Hi-5 Surprise! | Australia | Australian Capital Territory | 14 March 2010 | Canberra Theatre, Canberra | 10:00am, 12:00pm | |
| 2010 | Hi-5 Surprise! | Australia | New South Wales | 16 March 2010 | Bathurst Memorial Entertainment Centre, Bathurst | —N/a | |
| 2010 | Hi-5 Surprise! | Australia | New South Wales | 17 March 2010 | Albury Entertainment Centre, Albury | 11:30am, 2:00pm | |
| 2010 | Hi-5 Surprise! | Australia | New South Wales | 20 March 2010 | Illawarra Performing Arts Centre, Wollongong | 11:30am, 2:00pm | |
| 2010 | Hi-5 Surprise! | Australia | New South Wales | 21 March 2010 (Note: The original press release lists 21 March as shows in Wollongong, but further listings indicate performances in Newcastle on that day. The Newcastle shows were originally scheduled for 10 April 2010.) | Illawarra Performing Arts Centre, Wollongong | 10:00am, 12:00pm | |
| 2010 | Hi-5 Surprise! | Australia | New South Wales | 21 March 2010 | Newcastle Civic Theatre, Newcastle | —N/a | |
| 2010 | Hi-5 Surprise! | Australia | Queensland | 23 March 2010 | Ipswich Civic Centre, Ipswich | 11:30am, 2:00pm | |
| 2010 | Hi-5 Surprise! | Australia | Queensland | 24 March 2010 | Empire Theatre, Toowoomba | 11:30am, 2:00pm | |
| 2010 | Hi-5 Surprise! | Australia | Queensland | 25 March 2010 | The Events Centre, Caloundra | —N/a | |
| 2010 | Hi-5 Surprise! | Australia | Queensland | 27 March 2010 | Civic Theatre, Cairns | 11:30am, 2:00pm | |
| 2010 | Hi-5 Surprise! | Australia | Queensland | 28 March 2010 | Civic Theatre, Cairns | 11:30am, 2:00pm | |
| 2010 | Hi-5 Surprise! | Australia | Queensland | 30 March 2010 | Civic Theatre, Townsville | —N/a | |
| 2010 | Hi-5 Surprise! | Australia | Queensland | 31 March 2010 | Mackay Entertainment Centre, Mackay | 11:30am, 2:00pm | |
| 2010 | Hi-5 Surprise! | Australia | Queensland | 1 April 2010 | Pilbeam Theatre, Rockhampton | 11:30am, 2:00pm | |
| 2010 | Hi-5 Surprise! | Australia | Queensland | 3 April 2010 | Gold Coast Arts Centre, Gold Coast | 11:30am, 2:00pm | |
| 2010 | Hi-5 Surprise! | Australia | New South Wales | 6 April 2010 | Lismore Workers Club, Lismore | —N/a | |
| 2010 | Hi-5 Surprise! | Australia | New South Wales | 7 April 2010 | Coffs Ex Services Club, Coffs Harbour | —N/a | |
| 2010 | Hi-5 Surprise! | Australia | New South Wales | 8 April 2010 (Note: The original press release lists 8 and 9 April as shows in New South Wales, but further listings indicate performances in Western Australia on those dates.) | Port Macquarie Panthers, Port Macquarie | —N/a | |
| 2010 | Hi-5 Surprise! | Australia | New South Wales | 9 April 2010 | Mingara Recreation Club, Tumbi Umbi | —N/a | |
| 2010 | Hi-5 Surprise! | Australia | Western Australia | 8 April 2010 | Regal Theatre, Perth | —N/a | |
| 2010 | Hi-5 Surprise! | Australia | Western Australia | 9 April 2010 | Regal Theatre, Perth | —N/a | |
| 2010 | Hi-5 Surprise! | Australia | Victoria | 13 April 2010 | Wyndham Cultural Centre, Werribee | —N/a | |
| 2010 | Hi-5 Surprise! | Australia | Victoria | 14 April 2010 | Clocktower Centre, Moonee Ponds | 11:30am | |
| 2010 | Hi-5 Surprise! | Australia | Tasmania | 16 April 2010 | Theatre Royal, Hobart | —N/a | |
| 2010 | Hi-5 Surprise! | Australia | Tasmania | 17 April 2010 | Theatre Royal, Hobart | —N/a | |
| 2010 | Hi-5 Surprise! | Australia | Tasmania | 18 April 2010 | Princess Theatre, Launceston | 11:30am, 2:00pm | |
| 2011 | Turn the Music Up! | Australia | New South Wales | 8 April 2011 | Penrith Panthers, Penrith | 6:00pm | |
| 2011 | Turn the Music Up! | Australia | New South Wales | 9 April 2011 | Enmore Theatre, Sydney | 11:30am, 1:30pm, 3:30pm | |
| 2011 | Turn the Music Up! | Australia | New South Wales | 11 April 2011 | Newcastle Civic Theatre, Newcastle | 11:30am, 1:30pm | |
| 2011 | Turn the Music Up! | Australia | New South Wales | 12 April 2011 | Sutherland Entertainment Centre, Sutherland | 11:30am, 1:30pm | |
| 2011 | Turn the Music Up! | Australia | New South Wales | 13 April 2011 | The Cube, Campbelltown Convention and Entertainment Centre, Campbelltown | 10:30am, 12:45pm | |
| 2011 | Turn the Music Up! | Australia | New South Wales | 14 April 2011 | Penrith Panthers, Penrith | 11.30am, 1:30pm | |
| 2011 | Turn the Music Up! | Australia | Victoria | 15 April 2011 | Dallas Brooks Hall, Melbourne | —N/a | |
| 2011 | Turn the Music Up! | Australia | Victoria | 16 April 2011 | Drum Theatre, Dandenong | 11:30am, 1:30pm | |
| 2011 | Turn the Music Up! | Australia | Victoria | 18 April 2011 | Frankston Arts Centre, Frankston | 11:30am, 12:30pm | |
| 2011 | Turn the Music Up! | Australia | Victoria | 19 April 2011 | Robert Blackwood Hall, Monash University, Melbourne | —N/a | |
| 2011 | Turn the Music Up! | Australia | Victoria | 20 April 2011 | Clocktower Centre, Moonee Ponds | 11:30am, 1:30pm | |
| 2011 | Turn the Music Up! | Australia | Victoria | 21 April 2011 | Clocktower Centre, Moonee Ponds | 10:00am, 12:00pm | |
| 2011 | Turn the Music Up! | Australia | New South Wales | 27 April 2011 | The Juniors, Kingsford | 11:30am, 1:30pm | |
| 2011 | Turn the Music Up! | Australia | New South Wales | 29 April 2011 | Illawarra Performing Arts Centre, Wollongong | 11:30am, 1:30pm | |
| 2011 | Turn the Music Up! | Australia | Australian Capital Territory | 28 April 2011 | Canberra Theatre, Canberra | 11:30am, 1:30pm | |
| 2011 | Turn the Music Up! | Australia | South Australia | 1 May 2011 | Her Majesty's Theatre, Adelaide | —N/a | |
| 2011 | Turn the Music Up! | Australia | Western Australia | 7 May 2011 | Bunbury Entertainment Centre, Bunbury | 11:30am, 1:30pm | |
| 2011 | Turn the Music Up! | Australia | Western Australia | 8 May 2011 | Perth Concert Hall, Perth | 11:30am, 1:30pm, 3:30pm | |
| 2011 | Turn the Music Up! | Australia | Queensland | 13 May 2011 | Nambour Civic Centre, Nambour | 6:00pm | |
| 2011 | Turn the Music Up! | Australia | Queensland | 14 May 2011 | Logan Entertainment Centre, Logan City | 11:30am, 1:30pm | |
| 2011 | Turn the Music Up! | Australia | Queensland | 15 May 2011 | Gold Coast Arts Centre, Gold Coast | 11:30am, 2:30pm | |
| 2012 | Hi-5 Holiday! | Australia | New South Wales | 23 March 2012 | The Concourse Concert Hall, Chatswood | 6:00pm | |
| 2012 | Hi-5 Holiday! | Australia | New South Wales | 24 March 2012 | The Concourse Concert Hall, Chatswood | 10:00am, 12:00pm | |
| 2012 | Hi-5 Holiday! | Australia | New South Wales | 25 March 2012 | Enmore Theatre, Sydney | 11:30am, 1:30pm | |
| 2012 | Hi-5 Holiday! | Australia | Victoria | 1 April 2012 | Frankston Arts Centre, Frankston | 11:30am, 1:30pm, 3:30pm | |
| 2012 | Hi-5 Holiday! | Australia | Victoria | 3 April 2012 | The Capital Theatre, Bendigo | 11:30am, 1:30pm | |
| 2012 | Hi-5 Holiday! | Australia | Western Australia | 11 April 2012 | His Majesty's Theatre, Perth | 11:30am, 1:30pm, 3:30pm | |
| 2012 | Hi-5 Holiday! | Australia | Western Australia | 12 April 2012 | His Majesty's Theatre, Perth | 10:00am, 12:00pm | |
| 2012 | Hi-5 Holiday! | Australia | Western Australia | 13 April 2012 | Bunbury Entertainment Centre, Bunbury | 11:30am, 1:30pm | |
| 2012 | Hi-5 Holiday! | Australia | South Australia | 17 April 2012 | Her Majesty's Theatre, Adelaide | 11:30am, 1:30pm | |
| 2012 | Hi-5 Holiday! | Australia | Victoria | 20 April 2012 | Her Majesty's Theatre, Ballarat | 11:30am, 1:30pm | |
| 2012 | Hi-5 Holiday! | Australia | Victoria | 21 April 2012 | Dallas Brooks Hall, Melbourne | 11:30am, 1:30pm | |
| 2012 | Hi-5 Holiday! | Australia | New South Wales | 23 April 2012 | Civic Theatre, Wagga Wagga | 11:30am, 1:30pm | |
| 2012 | Hi-5 Holiday! | Australia | Australian Capital Territory | 24 April 2012 | Canberra Theatre, Canberra | 11:30pm, 1:30pm | |
| 2012 | Hi-5 Holiday! | Australia | New South Wales | 19 May 2012 (Note: The Alburny shows were originally scheduled for 22 April 2012, but postponed to 19 May.) | Albury Entertainment Centre, Albury | 10:00am, 12:00pm | |
| 2012 | Hi-5 Holiday! | Australia | Queensland | 25 May 2012 | Concert Hall, Queensland Performing Arts Centre, South Bank | 6:00pm | |
| 2012 | Hi-5 Holiday! | Australia | Queensland | 26 May 2012 | Concert Hall, Queensland Performing Arts Centre, South Bank | 10:00am, 12:00pm | |
| 2012 | Hi-5 Holiday! | Australia | Northern Territory | 2 June 2012 | Darwin Entertainment Centre, Darwin | 11:30am, 1:30pm | |
| 2012 | Hi-5 Holiday! | Singapore | Central Region | 4 September 2012 | Grand Theater, Mastercard Theatres, Marina Bay Sands, Downtown Core | 11:00am, 2:15pm | |
| 2012 | Hi-5 Holiday! | Singapore | Central Region | 5 September 2012 | Grand Theater, Mastercard Theatres, Marina Bay Sands, Downtown Core | 11:00am, 2:15pm | |
| 2012 | Hi-5 Holiday! | Singapore | Central Region | 6 September 2012 | Grand Theater, Mastercard Theatres, Marina Bay Sands, Downtown Core | 11:00am, 2:15pm | |
| 2012 | Hi-5 Holiday! | Singapore | Central Region | 7 September 2012 | Grand Theater, Mastercard Theatres, Marina Bay Sands, Downtown Core | 11:00am, 2:15pm | |
| 2012 | Hi-5 Holiday! | Singapore | Central Region | 8 September 2012 | Grand Theater, Mastercard Theatres, Marina Bay Sands, Downtown Core | 11:00am, 2:15pm, 5:00pm | |
| 2012 | Hi-5 Holiday! | Singapore | Central Region | 9 September 2012 | Grand Theater, Mastercard Theatres, Marina Bay Sands, Downtown Core | 11:00am, 2:15pm, 5:00pm | |
| 2012 | Hi-5 Holiday! | Malaysia | Kuala Lumpur | 14 September 2012 | Plenary Hall, Kuala Lumpur Convention Centre | —N/a | |
| 2012 | Hi-5 Holiday! | Malaysia | Kuala Lumpur | 15 September 2012 | Plenary Hall, Kuala Lumpur Convention Centre | —N/a | |
| 2012 | Hi-5 Holiday! | Malaysia | Kuala Lumpur | 16 September 2012 | Plenary Hall, Kuala Lumpur Convention Centre | —N/a | |
| 2012 | Hi-5 Holiday! | Philippines | Manila | 15 December 2012 | Center Stage, SM Mall of Asia, Bay City | 1:00pm, 4:00pm, 7:00pm | |
| 2012 | Hi-5 Holiday! | Philippines | Manila | 16 December 2012 | Center Stage, SM Mall of Asia, Bay City | 1:00pm, 4:00pm, 7:00pm | |
| 2013 | Hi-5 Holiday! | Philippines | Cebu | 19 January 2013 (Note: The Cebu shows were originally scheduled for 23 December 2012, but postponed to 19 January 2013 due to Hi-5's appearance at the 2012 Carols by Candlelight in Australia on 24 December 2012.) | Waterfront Cebu City Hotel & Casino, Cebu City | 4:00pm, 7:00pm | |
| 2013 | Hi-5 House Party | Australia | Victoria | 1 November 2013 | Karralyka Centre, Ringwood | —N/a | |
| 2013 | Hi-5 House Party | Australia | Victoria | 2 November 2013 | Clocktower Centre, Moonee Ponds | 10:00am, 12:30pm | |
| 2013 | Hi-5 House Party | Australia | Victoria | 3 November 2013 | Drum Theatre, Dandenong | —N/a | |
| 2013 | Hi-5 House Party | Australia | Victoria | 4 November 2013 | Geelong Arts Centre, Geelong | —N/a | |
| 2013 | Hi-5 House Party | Australia | New South Wales | 7 November 2013 | Albury Entertainment Centre, Albury | 4:30pm | |
| 2013 | Hi-5 House Party | Australia | Australian Capital Territory | 9 November 2013 | Canberra Theatre, Canberra | —N/a | |
| 2013 | Hi-5 House Party | Australia | New South Wales | 10 November 2013 | Illawarra Performing Arts Centre, Wollongong | 10:00am, 1:00pm | |
| 2013 | Hi-5 House Party | Australia | New South Wales | 12 November 2013 | Newcastle Panthers, Newcastle | —N/a | |
| 2013 | Hi-5 House Party | Australia | New South Wales | 13 November 2013 | The Cube, Campbelltown Convention and Entertainment Centre, Campbelltown | —N/a | |
| 2013 | Hi-5 House Party | Australia | Queensland | 21 November 2013 | Redcliffe Cultural Centre, Redcliffe | —N/a | |
| 2013 | Hi-5 House Party | Australia | Queensland | 23 November 2013 | Gardens Theatre, Brisbane | —N/a | |
| 2013 | Hi-5 House Party | Australia | New South Wales | 26 November 2013 | Mingara Recreation Club, Tumbi Umbi | —N/a | |
| 2013 | Hi-5 House Party | Australia | New South Wales | 27 November 2013 | Evan Theatre, Penrith Panthers, Penrith | 10:00am, 12:30pm | |
| 2013 | Hi-5 House Party | Australia | New South Wales | 29 November 2013 | Whitlam Theatre, Revesby Workers Club, Revesby | 10:00am, 1:00pm | |
| 2013 | Hi-5 House Party | Australia | New South Wales | 30 November 2013 | The Concourse Concert Hall, Chatswood | —N/a | |
| 2013 | Hi-5 House Party | Australia | New South Wales | 1 December 2013 | The Concourse Concert Hall, Chatswood | —N/a | |
| 2013 | Hi-5 House Party | Hong Kong | Kowloon | 6 December 2013 | Macpherson Stadium, Mong Kok | 3:00pm, 7:00pm | |
| 2013 | Hi-5 House Party | Hong Kong | Kowloon | 7 December 2013 | Macpherson Stadium, Mong Kok | 12:00pm, 3:00pm, 6:00pm | |
| 2013 | Hi-5 House Party | Hong Kong | Kowloon | 8 December 2013 | Macpherson Stadium, Mong Kok | 12:00pm, 3:00pm, 6:00pm | |
| 2013 | Hi-5 House Party | Philippines | Manila | 13 December 2013 | Samsung Hall, SM Aura Premier, Taguig | —N/a | |
| 2013 | Hi-5 House Party | Philippines | Manila | 14 December 2013 | Samsung Hall, SM Aura Premier, Taguig | —N/a | |
| 2013 | Hi-5 House Party | Philippines | Manila | 15 December 2013 | Samsung Hall, SM Aura Premier, Taguig | —N/a | |
| 2013 | Hi-5 House Party | Singapore | Central Region | 20 December 2013 | Mastercard Theatres, Marina Bay Sands, Downtown Core | 11:00am, 3:00pm, 6:45pm | |
| 2013 | Hi-5 House Party | Singapore | Central Region | 21 December 2013 | Mastercard Theatres, Marina Bay Sands, Downtown Core | 11:00am, 3:00pm, 6:45pm | |
| 2013 | Hi-5 House Party | Singapore | Central Region | 22 December 2013 | Mastercard Theatres, Marina Bay Sands, Downtown Core | 11:00am, 3:00pm, 6:45pm | |
| 2013 | Hi-5 House Party | Malaysia | Kuala Lumpur | 28 December 2013 | Pentas 1, Kuala Lumpur Performing Arts Centre, Sentul Park | 11:00am, 2:30pm, 6:00pm | |
| 2013 | Hi-5 House Party | Malaysia | Kuala Lumpur | 29 December 2013 | Pentas 1, Kuala Lumpur Performing Arts Centre, Sentul Park | 11:00am, 2:30pm, 6:00pm | |
| 2014 | Hi-5 House Party | Indonesia | Jakarta | 7 March 2014 | Skenoo Exhibition Hall, Gandaria City, Kebayoran Lama | 3:00pm, 7:00pm | |
| 2014 | Hi-5 House Party | Indonesia | Jakarta | 8 March 2014 | Skenoo Exhibition Hall, Gandaria City, Kebayoran Lama | 11:00am, 3:00pm, 7:00pm | |
| 2014 | Hi-5 House Party | Indonesia | Jakarta | 9 March 2014 | Skenoo Exhibition Hall, Gandaria City, Kebayoran Lama | 3:00pm, 7:00pm | |
| 2014 | Hi-5 House Party | Indonesia | Surabaya | 11 March 2014 | Tunjungan Convention Center, Tunjungan Plaza, Central Surabaya | 3:00pm, 7:00pm | |
| 2014 | Hi-5 House Party | Indonesia | Surabaya | 12 March 2014 | Tunjungan Convention Center, Tunjungan Plaza, Central Surabaya | 3:00pm, 7:00pm | |
| 2014 | Hi-5 House Party | Indonesia | Surabaya | 13 March 2014 | Tunjungan Convention Center, Tunjungan Plaza, Central Surabaya | 3:00pm, 7:00pm | |
| 2014 | Hi-5 House Party | Indonesia | Surabaya | 14 March 2014 | Tunjungan Convention Center, Tunjungan Plaza, Central Surabaya | 2:00pm | |
| 2014 | Hi-5 House Hits! | Australia | New South Wales | 30 June 2014 | The Concourse Concert Hall, Chatswood | 10:00am, 12:30pm, 3:30pm | |
| 2014 | Hi-5 House Hits! | Australia | New South Wales | 1 July 2014 | Mount Pritchard Mounties, Mount Pritchard | 10:00am | |
| 2014 | Hi-5 House Hits! | Australia | New South Wales | 2 July 2014 | Enmore Theatre, Sydney | 10:00am | |
| 2014 | Hi-5 House Hits! | Australia | New South Wales | 3 July 2014 | Evan Theatre, Penrith Panthers, Penrith | 10:00am, 12:30pm | |
| 2014 | Hi-5 House Hits! | Australia | Western Australia | 6 July 2014 | Perth Concert Hall, Perth | 11:00am, 1:30pm, 4:00pm | |
| 2014 | Hi-5 House Hits! | Australia | South Australia | 10 July 2014 | Theatre, Adelaide Entertainment Centre, Adelaide | 10:30am | |
| 2014 | Hi-5 House Hits! | Australia | Victoria | 11 July 2014 | Frankston Arts Centre, Frankston | 10:00am, 12:30pm | |
| 2014 | Hi-5 House Hits! | Australia | Victoria | 12 July 2014 | Palais Theatre, Melbourne | 10:00am, 1:00pm, 4:00pm | |
| 2014 | Hi-5 House Hits! | Thailand | Bangkok | 2 August 2014 | Bangkok Convention Centre, CentralPlaza Lardprao | 11:00am, 3:00pm | |
| 2014 | Hi-5 House Hits! | Thailand | Bangkok | 3 August 2014 | Bangkok Convention Centre, CentralPlaza Lardprao | 11:00am, 3:00pm | |
| 2014 | Hi-5 House Hits! | Hong Kong | New Territories | 9 August 2014 | AsiaWorld–Expo, Chek Lap Kok | 11:00am, 2:30pm, 6:00pm | |
| 2014 | Hi-5 House Hits! | Hong Kong | New Territories | 10 August 2014 | AsiaWorld–Expo, Chek Lap Kok | 11:00am, 2:30pm, 6:00pm | |
| 2014 | Hi-5 House Hits! | United Arab Emirates | Dubai | 12 September 2014 | Dubai World Trade Centre | 11:00am, 3:00pm, 7:00pm | |
| 2014 | Hi-5 House Hits! | United Arab Emirates | Dubai | 13 September 2014 | Dubai World Trade Centre | 11:00am, 3:00pm, 7:00pm | |
| 2014 | Hi-5 House Hits! | Singapore | Central Region | 5 December 2014 | The Star Performing Arts Centre, Queenstown | 11:00am, 3:00pm, 7:00pm | |
| 2014 | Hi-5 House Hits! | Singapore | Central Region | 6 December 2014 | The Star Performing Arts Centre, Queenstown | 11:00am, 3:00pm, 7:00pm | |
| 2014 | Hi-5 House Hits! | Malaysia | Kuala Lumpur | 10 December 2014 | Pentas 1, Kuala Lumpur Performing Arts Centre, Sentul Park | 6:00pm | |
| 2014 | Hi-5 House Hits! | Malaysia | Kuala Lumpur | 11 December 2014 | Pentas 1, Kuala Lumpur Performing Arts Centre, Sentul Park | 2:30pm, 6:00pm | |
| 2014 | Hi-5 House Hits! | Malaysia | Kuala Lumpur | 12 December 2014 | Pentas 1, Kuala Lumpur Performing Arts Centre, Sentul Park | 2:30pm, 6:00pm | |
| 2014 | Hi-5 House Hits! | Malaysia | Kuala Lumpur | 13 December 2014 | Pentas 1, Kuala Lumpur Performing Arts Centre, Sentul Park | 11:00am, 2:30pm | |
| 2014 | Hi-5 House Hits! | Malaysia | Kuala Lumpur | 14 December 2014 | Pentas 1, Kuala Lumpur Performing Arts Centre, Sentul Park | 11:00am, 2:30pm | |
| 2014 | Hi-5 House Hits! | Philippines | Manila | 19 December 2014 | Newport Performing Arts Theater, Resorts World Manila, Pasay | 3:00pm, 7:00pm | |
| 2014 | Hi-5 House Hits! | Philippines | Manila | 20 December 2014 | Newport Performing Arts Theater, Resorts World Manila, Pasay | 11:00am, 3:00pm, 7:00pm | |
| 2014 | Hi-5 House Hits! | Philippines | Manila | 21 December 2014 | Newport Performing Arts Theater, Resorts World Manila, Pasay | 11:00am, 3:00pm, 7:00pm | |
| 2015 | Hi-5 House Hits! | Australia | New South Wales | 22 January 2015 | Newcastle Panthers, Newcastle | —N/a | |
| 2015 | Hi-5 House Hits! | Australia | New South Wales | 23 January 2015 | Port Macquarie Panthers, Port Macquarie | 10:00am | |
| 2015 | Hi-5 House Hits! | Australia | New South Wales | 24 January 2015 | Club Forster, Forster | 10:00am | |
| 2015 | Hi-5 House Hits! | Australia | New South Wales | 25 January 2015 | Coffs Ex Services Club, Coffs Harbour | 10:00am | |
| 2015 | Hi-5 House Hits! | Indonesia | Jakarta | 18 February 2015 | Skenoo Exhibition Hall, Gandaria City, Kebayoran Lama | 6:00pm | |
| 2015 | Hi-5 House Hits! | Indonesia | Jakarta | 19 February 2015 | Skenoo Exhibition Hall, Gandaria City, Kebayoran Lama | 11:00am, 3:00pm | |
| 2015 | Hi-5 House Hits! | Indonesia | Jakarta | 20 February 2015 | Skenoo Exhibition Hall, Gandaria City, Kebayoran Lama | 3:00pm, 7:00pm | |
| 2015 | Hi-5 House Hits! | Indonesia | Jakarta | 21 February 2015 | Skenoo Exhibition Hall, Gandaria City, Kebayoran Lama | 11:00am, 3:00pm, 7:00pm | |
| 2015 | Hi-5 House Hits! | Indonesia | Jakarta | 22 February 2015 | Skenoo Exhibition Hall, Gandaria City, Kebayoran Lama | 3:00pm, 7:00pm | |
| 2015 | Hi-5 House Hits! | Philippines | Manila | 28 February 2015 | Meralco Theater, Pasig | 11:00am, 3:00pm, 7:00pm | |
| 2015 | Hi-5 House Hits! | Philippines | Manila | 1 March 2015 | Meralco Theater, Pasig | 11:00am, 3:00pm, 7:00pm | |
| 2015 | Hi-5 House of Dreams | Australia | New South Wales | 28 June 2015 | Luna Park Sydney, Milsons Point | 10:00am, 1:30pm | |
| 2015 | Hi-5 House of Dreams | Australia | Queensland | 1 July 2015 | Royal International Convention Centre, Brisbane Showgrounds, Bowen Hills | 10:00am, 1:30pm | |
| 2015 | Hi-5 House of Dreams | Australia | Queensland | 2 July 2015 | Royal International Convention Centre, Brisbane Showgrounds, Bowen Hills | 10:00am, 1:30pm | |
| 2015 | Hi-5 House of Dreams | Australia | Victoria | 4 July 2015 | Palais Theatre, Melbourne | 10:00am, 1:30pm, 4:00pm | |
| 2015 | Hi-5 House of Dreams | Australia | New South Wales | 7 July 2015 | The Concourse Concert Hall, Chatswood | 10:00am, 1:30pm | |
| 2015 | Hi-5 House of Dreams | Australia | New South Wales | 8 July 2015 | The Concourse Concert Hall, Chatswood | 10:00am, 1:30pm | |
| 2015 | Hi-5 House of Dreams | Australia | Western Australia | 14 July 2015 | Regal Theatre, Perth | 10:00am, 1:30pm | |
| 2015 | Hi-5 House of Dreams | Australia | Western Australia | 15 July 2015 | Regal Theatre, Perth | 10:00am, 1:30pm | |
| 2015 | Hi-5 House of Dreams | Hong Kong | New Territories | 15 August 2015 | Runway 11, AsiaWorld–Expo, Chek Lap Kok | 11:00am, 2:30pm, 6:00pm | |
| 2015 | Hi-5 House of Dreams | Hong Kong | New Territories | 16 August 2015 | Runway 11, AsiaWorld–Expo, Chek Lap Kok | 11:00am, 2:30pm, 6:00pm | |
| 2015 | Hi-5 House of Dreams | Singapore | Central Region | 12 September 2015 | Grand Theater, Mastercard Theatres, Marina Bay Sands, Downtown Core | 10:30am, 2:30pm, 6:30pm | |
| 2015 | Hi-5 House of Dreams | Singapore | Central Region | 13 September 2015 | Grand Theater, Mastercard Theatres, Marina Bay Sands, Downtown Core | 10:30am, 2:30pm, 6:30pm | |
| 2015 | Hi-5 House of Dreams | Thailand | Bangkok | 19 September 2015 (Note: The Bangkok shows were originally scheduled for 22 and 23 August 2015, but postponed to September due to the 2015 Bangkok bombing.) | Bangkok Convention Centre, CentralPlaza Lardprao | 11:00am, 2:30pm, 6:00pm | |
| 2015 | Hi-5 House of Dreams | Thailand | Bangkok | 20 September 2015 | Bangkok Convention Centre, CentralPlaza Lardprao | 11:00am, 2:30pm | |
| 2015 | Hi-5 House of Dreams | Indonesia | Jakarta | 4 December 2015 | Grand Ballroom, Sheraton Jakarta Gandaria City, Kebayoran Lama | 7:00pm | |
| 2015 | Hi-5 House of Dreams | Indonesia | Jakarta | 5 December 2015 | Grand Ballroom, Sheraton Jakarta Gandaria City, Kebayoran Lama | 11:00am, 3:00pm, 7:00pm | |
| 2015 | Hi-5 House of Dreams | Indonesia | Jakarta | 6 December 2015 | Grand Ballroom, Sheraton Jakarta Gandaria City, Kebayoran Lama | 3:00pm, 7:00pm | |
| 2015 | Hi-5 House of Dreams | Malaysia | Kuala Lumpur | 10 December 2015 | Istana Budaya | 10:30am, 2:00pm, 5:00pm | |
| 2015 | Hi-5 House of Dreams | Malaysia | Kuala Lumpur | 11 December 2015 | Istana Budaya | 10:30am, 3:00pm | |
| 2015 | Hi-5 House of Dreams | Malaysia | Kuala Lumpur | 12 December 2015 | Istana Budaya | 10:30am, 2:00pm, 5:00pm | |
| 2015 | Hi-5 House of Dreams | Malaysia | Kuala Lumpur | 13 December 2015 | Istana Budaya | 10:30am, 2:00pm | |
| 2015 | Hi-5 House of Dreams | Philippines | Manila | 18 December 2015 | Newport Performing Arts Theater, Resorts World Manila, Pasay | 2:30pm, 6:00pm | |
| 2015 | Hi-5 House of Dreams | Philippines | Manila | 19 December 2015 | Newport Performing Arts Theater, Resorts World Manila, Pasay | 11:00am, 2:30pm, 6:00pm | |
| 2015 | Hi-5 House of Dreams | Philippines | Manila | 20 December 2015 | Newport Performing Arts Theater, Resorts World Manila, Pasay | 11:00am, 2:30pm, 6:00pm | |
| 2015 | Hi-5 House of Dreams | Philippines | Manila | 21 December 2015 | Newport Performing Arts Theater, Resorts World Manila, Pasay | 2:30pm, 6:00pm | |
| 2016 | Summer Songfest! | Australia | New South Wales | 10 January 2016 | Crowne Plaza, Hunter Valley | 3:30pm | |
| 2016 | Summer Songfest! | Australia | New South Wales | 11 January 2016 | Fairmont Resort, Blue Mountains | 11:00am | |
| 2016 | Songfest! | Australia | New South Wales | 10 February 2016 | Cronulla Sutherland Leagues Club, Cronulla | 10:30am | |
| 2016 | Songfest! | Australia | New South Wales | 19 February 2016 | Hornsby RSL Club, Hornsby | 10:30am | |
| 2016 | Songfest! | Australia | New South Wales | 21 February 2016 | Revesby Workers Club, Revesby | 10:00am | |
| 2016 | Songfest! | Australia | New South Wales | 26 February 2016 | Penrith Panthers, Penrith | 10:30am | |
| 2016 | Songfest! | Australia | New South Wales | 2 March 2016 | Canterbury Leagues Club, Belmore | 10:30am | |
| 2016 | Songfest! | Australia | New South Wales | 6 March 2016 | Mount Pritchard Community Club, Mount Pritchard | 10:30am | |
| 2016 | Songfest! | Australia | New South Wales | 16 March 2016 | Wentworthville Leagues Club, Wentworthville | 10:30am | |
| 2016 | Songfest! | Australia | New South Wales | 20 March 2016 | Rooty Hill RSL, Rooty Hill | 10:30am | |
| 2016 | Hi-5 Fairytale | Hong Kong | Kowloon | 27 August 2016 | Star Hall, Kowloonbay International Trade & Exhibition Centre, Kowloon Bay | 11:00am, 2:30pm | |
| 2016 | Hi-5 Fairytale | Hong Kong | Kowloon | 28 August 2016 | Star Hall, Kowloonbay International Trade & Exhibition Centre, Kowloon Bay | 11:00am, 2:30pm | |
| 2016 | Hi-5 House Hits! | New Zealand | North Island | 1 October 2016 (Note: The Auckland shows were originally scheduled for 30 and 31 January 2016 at the Bruce Mason Centre as Hi-5 House of Dreams, but were postponed along with the other New Zealand shows "due to a change in international filming commitments".) | ASB Theatre, Aotea Centre, Auckland | 11:00am, 1:30pm | |
| 2016 | Hi-5 House Hits! | New Zealand | North Island | 2 October 2016 | Hamilton Heaphy Room, Claudelands | 11:00am | |
| 2016 | Hi-5 House Hits! | New Zealand | North Island | 3 October 2016 | Napier Municipal Theatre, Napier | 11:00am | |
| 2016 | Hi-5 House Hits! | New Zealand | South Island | 5 October 2016 (Note: The Christchurch shows were originally scheduled for 26 and 27 January 2016 as Hi-5 House of Dreams, but were postponed along with the other New Zealand shows "due to a change in international filming commitments".) | Isaac Theatre Royal, Christchurch | 10:00am, 12:30pm | |
| 2016 | Hi-5 House Hits! | New Zealand | South Island | 6 October 2016 | Regent Theatre, Dunedin | 11:00am | |
| 2016 | Hi-5 House Hits! | New Zealand | North Island | 8 October 2016 (Note: The Wellington shows were originally scheduled for 23 and 24 January 2016 at the Opera House as Hi-5 House of Dreams, but were postponed along with the other New Zealand shows "due to a change in international filming commitments".) | St. James Theatre, Wellington | 10:00am, 12:30pm | |
| 2016 | Hi-5 Fairytale | Singapore | Central Region | 2 December 2016 | Sands Theatre, Mastercard Theatres, Marina Bay Sands, Downtown Core | 10:30am, 2:30pm | |
| 2016 | Hi-5 Fairytale | Singapore | Central Region | 3 December 2016 | Sands Theatre, Mastercard Theatres, Marina Bay Sands, Downtown Core | 10:30am, 2:30pm, 6:30pm | |
| 2016 | Hi-5 Fairytale | Singapore | Central Region | 4 December 2016 | Sands Theatre, Mastercard Theatres, Marina Bay Sands, Downtown Core | 10:30am, 2:30pm | |
| 2016 | Hi-5 Fairytale | Malaysia | Kuala Lumpur | 8 December 2016 | Istana Budaya | 2:00pm | |
| 2016 | Hi-5 Fairytale | Malaysia | Kuala Lumpur | 9 December 2016 | Istana Budaya | 3:00pm | |
| 2016 | Hi-5 Fairytale | Malaysia | Kuala Lumpur | 10 December 2016 | Istana Budaya | 10:30am, 2:00pm | |
| 2016 | Hi-5 Fairytale | Malaysia | Kuala Lumpur | 11 December 2016 | Istana Budaya | 10:30am, 2:00pm | |
| 2016 | Hi-5 Fairytale | Philippines | Manila | 16 December 2016 | Newport Performing Arts Theater, Resorts World Manila, Pasay | 2:30pm, 6:00pm | |
| 2016 | Hi-5 Fairytale | Philippines | Manila | 17 December 2016 | Newport Performing Arts Theater, Resorts World Manila, Pasay | 11:00am, 2:30pm, 6:00pm | |
| 2016 | Hi-5 Fairytale | Philippines | Manila | 18 December 2016 | Newport Performing Arts Theater, Resorts World Manila, Pasay | 2:30pm, 6:00pm | |
| 2017 | Summer Holiday Show! | Australia | New South Wales | 14 January 2017 | Crowne Plaza, Hunter Valley | 2:00pm | |
| 2017 | Summer Holiday Show! | Australia | New South Wales | 15 January 2017 | Fairmont Resort, Blue Mountains | 2:00pm | |
| 2018 | Summer Rainbows | Australia | New South Wales | 12 January 2018 | Crowne Plaza, Hunter Valley | 11:00am | |
| 2018 | Summer Rainbows | Australia | New South Wales | 13 January 2018 | Fairmont Resort, Blue Mountains | 2:00pm | |
| 2018 | Hi-5 Supers | Vietnam | Ho Chi Minh City | 24 April 2018 | Ben Thanh Theatre, Ho Chi Minh City | —N/a | |
| 2018 | Hi-5 Supers | Vietnam | Ho Chi Minh City | 25 April 2018 | Ben Thanh Theatre, Ho Chi Minh City | —N/a | |
| 2018 | Hi-5 Supers | Vietnam | Ho Chi Minh City | 26 April 2018 | Ben Thanh Theatre, Ho Chi Minh City | —N/a | |
| 2018 | Hi-5 Supers | Vietnam | Hanoi | 29 April 2018 | Viet Xo Friendship Labour Cultural Palace, Hanoi | —N/a | |
| 2018 | Hi-5 Supers | Vietnam | Hanoi | 30 April 2018 | Viet Xo Friendship Labour Cultural Palace, Hanoi | —N/a | |
| 2018 | Hi-5 Supers | Vietnam | Hanoi | 1 May 2018 | Viet Xo Friendship Labour Cultural Palace, Hanoi | —N/a | |
| 2018 | Hi-5 Supers | Singapore | Central Region | 7 December 2018 (Note: The Singapore shows were originally scheduled for 15 to 17 December 2017, but were postponed to 2018.) | Sands Theatre, Mastercard Theatres, Marina Bay Sands, Downtown Core | 2:30pm, 6:30pm | |
| 2018 | Hi-5 Supers | Singapore | Central Region | 8 December 2018 | Sands Theatre, Mastercard Theatres, Marina Bay Sands, Downtown Core | 10:30am, 2:30pm, 6:30pm | |
| 2018 | Hi-5 Supers | Singapore | Central Region | 9 December 2018 | Sands Theatre, Mastercard Theatres, Marina Bay Sands, Downtown Core | 10:30am, 2:30pm, 6:30pm | |
| 2019 | Hi-5 Supers | Indonesia | Jakarta | 1 November 2019 | Main Atrium, PIK Avenue | 11:00am, 2:00pm, 5:00pm, 8:00pm | |
| 2019 | Hi-5 Supers | Indonesia | Jakarta | 2 November 2019 | Main Atrium, PIK Avenue | 11:00am, 2:00pm, 5:00pm, 8:00pm | |
| 2019 | Hi-5 Supers | Indonesia | Jakarta | 3 November 2019 | Main Atrium, PIK Avenue | 11:00am, 2:00pm, 5:00pm, 8:00pm | |

== Cancelled performances ==
List of cancelled performances by Hi-5
| Year | Tour | Country | Region | Date | Venue | Times | Cancellation reason | Ref. |
|---|---|---|---|---|---|---|---|---|
| 2014 | Hi-5 House Hits! | Qatar | Doha | 5 September 2014 | Qatar National Convention Centre | 7:00pm | Not known | |
| 2014 | Hi-5 House Hits! | Qatar | Doha | 6 September 2014 | Qatar National Convention Centre | 7:00pm | Not known | |
| 2019 | Hi-5 Supers | Hong Kong | Kowloon | 14 September 2019 | Star Hall, Kowloonbay International Trade & Exhibition Centre, Kowloon Bay | 2:00pm, 6:00pm | 2019–20 Hong Kong protests | |
| 2019 | Hi-5 Supers | Hong Kong | Kowloon | 15 September 2019 | Star Hall, Kowloonbay International Trade & Exhibition Centre, Kowloon Bay | 11:00am, 3:00pm | 2019–20 Hong Kong protests | |

== Televised appearances ==
List of televised appearances by Hi-5
| Year | Concert | Country | State | Date | Venue | Ref. |
|---|---|---|---|---|---|---|
| 1999 | Carols by Candlelight | Australia | Victoria | 24 December 1999 | Sidney Myer Music Bowl, Melbourne | |
| 2000 | Carols by Candlelight | Australia | Victoria | 24 December 2000 | Sidney Myer Music Bowl, Melbourne | |
| 2001 | Carols by Candlelight | Australia | Victoria | 24 December 2001 | Sidney Myer Music Bowl, Melbourne | |
| 2002 | Carols by Candlelight | Australia | Victoria | 24 December 2002 | Sidney Myer Music Bowl, Melbourne | |
| 2003 | Carols by Candlelight | Australia | Victoria | 24 December 2003 | Sidney Myer Music Bowl, Melbourne | |
| 2004 | Carols by Candlelight | Australia | Victoria | 24 December 2004 | Sidney Myer Music Bowl, Melbourne | |
| 2005 | Carols by Candlelight | Australia | Victoria | 24 December 2005 | Sidney Myer Music Bowl, Melbourne | |
| 2006 | Carols by Candlelight | Australia | Victoria | 24 December 2006 | Sidney Myer Music Bowl, Melbourne | |
| 2007 | Carols by Candlelight | Australia | Victoria | 24 December 2007 | Sidney Myer Music Bowl, Melbourne | |
| 2008 | Carols by Candlelight | Australia | Victoria | 24 December 2008 | Sidney Myer Music Bowl, Melbourne | |
| 2009 | Carols by Candlelight | Australia | Victoria | 24 December 2009 | Sidney Myer Music Bowl, Melbourne | |
| 2010 | Carols by Candlelight | Australia | Victoria | 24 December 2010 | Sidney Myer Music Bowl, Melbourne | |
| 2011 | Carols by Candlelight | Australia | Victoria | 24 December 2011 | Sidney Myer Music Bowl, Melbourne | |
| 2012 | Carols by Candlelight | Australia | Victoria | 24 December 2012 | Sidney Myer Music Bowl, Melbourne | |
| 2016 | Carols by Candlelight | Australia | Victoria | 24 December 2016 | Sidney Myer Music Bowl, Melbourne | |
| 2017 | Carols by Candlelight | Australia | Victoria | 24 December 2017 | Sidney Myer Music Bowl, Melbourne | |

== Other appearances ==
List of other appearances made by Hi-5
| Year | Country | State / Region | Date | Venue | Type | Description | Times | Ref. |
|---|---|---|---|---|---|---|---|---|
| 2000 | Australia | New South Wales | 2 September 2000 | Bathurst Memorial Entertainment Centre, Bathurst | Performance | 2000 Summer Olympics torch relay event | 11:00am, 1:00pm | |
| 2001 | Australia | New South Wales | 25 July 2001 | Westfield Miranda, Miranda | Meet and greet and signing | Promoting "Boom Boom Beat" album | 11:00am | |
| 2001 | Australia | Victoria | 26 July 2001 | Myer, Melbourne | Meet and greet and signing | Promoting "Boom Boom Beat" album | 12:00pm | |
| 2001 | Australia | South Australia | 27 July 2001 | Westfield Marion, Oaklands Park | Meet and greet and signing | Promoting "Boom Boom Beat" album | 11:00am | |
| 2001 | Australia | Queensland | 28 July 2001 | Westfield Carindale, Carindale | Meet and greet and signing | Promoting "Boom Boom Beat" album | 11:00am | |
| 2002 | Australia | Queensland | 31 October 2002 | Indooroopilly Shopping Centre, Brisbane | Performance and signing | Promoting "Celebrate" album | 11:00am – 1:00pm | |
| 2002 | Australia | New South Wales | 1 November 2002 | Westfield Warringah Mall, Brookvale | Performance and signing | Promoting "Celebrate" album | 11:00am – 1:00pm | |
| 2003 | Australia | New South Wales | 23 February 2003 | Westfield Parramatta, Parramatta | Performance and signing | Promoting "Celebrate" album | 2:00pm | |
| 2004 | Australia | Queensland | 13 April 2004 | Dreamworld, Gold Coast, Australia | Media access for photos and interviews | Promoting "Hi-5 Holiday" video release | 12:50pm – 1:25pm | |
| 2004 | Australia | Queensland | 13 April 2004 | Dreamworld, Gold Coast, Australia | Meet and greet | Promoting "Hi-5 Holiday" video release | 1:30pm – 2:30pm | |
| 2004 | Australia | New South Wales | 24 July 2004 | Cinema Plaza, Fox Studios, Moore Park | Meet and greet | Promoting "Come On and Party" video | 11:30am – 1:00pm | |
| 2005 | Australia | Victoria | 7 March 2005 | Federation Square, Melbourne | Performance | Promoting "Hi-5 Dance Hits, Volume 1" video | 10:30am – 11:45am | |
| 2006 | Australia | New South Wales | 18 June 2006 | Powerhouse Museum, Sydney | Performance and signing | Promoting "Wish Upon a Star" album | 12:20pm | |
| 2007 | Australia | New South Wales | 27 May 2007 | Awaba Street, Mosman, Sydney | Appearance and performance | Humpty Dumpty Balmoral Burn | 12:20pm | |
| 2007 | Australia | Queensland | 10 June 2007 | Roma Street Parkland, Brisbane | Performance | Short version of "Live Action Heroes" show | | |
| 2007 | Australia | New South Wales | 29 July 2007 | Hunter Valley Gardens, Hunter Valley | Performance | Short version of "Live Action Heroes" show | | |
| 2008 | New Zealand | South Island | 30 September 2008 | Westfield Riccarton, Christchurch | Meet and greet | Promoting "The Hi-5 Circus Stage Show" tour | 3:00pm | |
| 2008 | New Zealand | North Island | 2 October 2008 | Queensgate Shopping Centre, Wellington | Meet and greet | Promoting "The Hi-5 Circus Stage Show" tour | 3:00pm | |
| 2008 | New Zealand | North Island | 7 October 2008 | Event Cinemas Chartwell, Hamilton | Meet and greet | Promoting "The Hi-5 Circus Stage Show" tour | 3:00pm | |
| 2008 | New Zealand | North Island | 10 October 2008 | Westfield Albany, Auckland | Meet and greet | Promoting "The Hi-5 Circus Stage Show" tour | 10:30am | |
| 2008 | New Zealand | North Island | 10 October 2008 | Westfield Manukau City, Auckland | Meet and greet | Promoting "The Hi-5 Circus Stage Show" tour | 5:00pm | |
| 2008 | Australia | Victoria | 14 November 2008 | City Square, Melbourne | Appearance | Christmas tree lighting ceremony and concert | 6:30pm | |
| 2010 | Australia | New South Wales | 30 May 2010 | Awaba Street, Mosman, Sydney | Appearance | Humpty Dumpty Balmoral Burn | 12:20pm | |
| 2010 | Singapore | Central Region | 26 November 2010 | Marina Square, Singapore | Performance and meet and greet | Mall residency | 1:00pm, 4:00pm, 7:00pm | |
| 2010 | Singapore | Central Region | 27 November 2010 | Marina Square, Singapore | Performance and meet and greet | Mall residency | 1:00pm, 4:00pm, 7:00pm | |
| 2010 | Singapore | Central Region | 28 November 2010 | Marina Square, Singapore | Performance and meet and greet | Mall residency | 1:00pm, 4:00pm, 7:00pm | |
| 2010 | Singapore | Central Region | 30 November 2010 | Marina Square, Singapore | Performance and meet and greet | Mall residency | 1:00pm, 4:00pm, 7:00pm | |
| 2010 | Singapore | Central Region | 1 December 2010 | Marina Square, Singapore | Performance and meet and greet | Mall residency | 1:00pm, 4:00pm, 7:00pm | |
| 2010 | Singapore | Central Region | 2 December 2010 | Marina Square, Singapore | Performance and meet and greet | Mall residency | 1:00pm, 4:00pm, 7:00pm | |
| 2010 | Singapore | Central Region | 3 December 2010 | Marina Square, Singapore | Performance and meet and greet | Mall residency | 1:00pm, 4:00pm, 7:00pm | |
| 2010 | Singapore | Central Region | 4 December 2010 | Marina Square, Singapore | Performance and meet and greet | Mall residency | 1:00pm, 4:00pm, 7:00pm | |
| 2010 | Singapore | Central Region | 5 December 2010 | Marina Square, Singapore | Performance and meet and greet | Mall residency | 1:00pm, 4:00pm, 7:00pm | |
| 2010 | Singapore | Central Region | 7 December 2010 | Marina Square, Singapore | Performance and meet and greet | Mall residency | 1:00pm, 4:00pm, 7:00pm | |
| 2010 | Singapore | Central Region | 8 December 2010 | Marina Square, Singapore | Performance and meet and greet | Mall residency | 1:00pm, 4:00pm, 7:00pm | |
| 2010 | Singapore | Central Region | 9 December 2010 | Marina Square, Singapore | Performance and meet and greet | Mall residency | 1:00pm, 4:00pm, 7:00pm | |
| 2010 | Singapore | Central Region | 10 December 2010 | Marina Square, Singapore | Performance and meet and greet | Mall residency | 1:00pm, 4:00pm, 7:00pm | |
| 2010 | Singapore | Central Region | 11 December 2010 | Marina Square, Singapore | Performance and meet and greet | Mall residency | 1:00pm, 4:00pm, 7:00pm | |
| 2010 | Singapore | Central Region | 12 December 2010 | Marina Square, Singapore | Performance and meet and greet | Mall residency | 1:00pm, 4:00pm, 7:00pm | |
| 2011 | Australia | Queensland | 23 January 2011 | Brisbane Showgrounds, Bowen Hills | Performance and meet and greet | IGA Rhymes Festival | 11:30am | |
| 2011 | Australia | New South Wales | 26 February 2011 | Sydney Olympic Park Sports Centre, Sydney | Performance and meet and greet | Kids Day Out Music Festival | 1:00pm | |
| 2011 | Australia | New South Wales | 15 March 2011 | Westfield Liverpool, Liverpool | In-store signing | Promoting "Hey Presto" DVD | 4:00pm | |
| 2011 | Australia | New South Wales | 16 March 2011 | Macarthur Square, Brookvale | In-store signing | Promoting "Hey Presto" DVD | 4:00pm | |
| 2011 | Australia | New South Wales | 17 March 2011 | Westfield Warringah Mall, Brookvale | In-store signing | Promoting "Hey Presto" DVD | 4:00pm | |
| 2011 | Australia | New South Wales | 28 May 2011 | Blacktown, Sydney | Street parade and meet and greet | Blacktown Fiesta Streets Alive and Parade Day | 11:00am | |
| 2011 | Australia | New South Wales | 29 May 2011 | Awaba Street, Mosman, Sydney | Appearance and performance | Humpty Dumpty Balmoral Burn | 12:20pm | |
| 2011 | Australia | Queensland | 4 June 2011 | Emerald | Performance | Flood Fest | 12:45pm | |
| 2011 | Australia | Queensland | 26 June 2011 | Townsville Showground, Townsville | Performance and meet and greet | IGA Rhymes Festival | 12:45pm | |
| 2011 | Australia | New South Wales | 17 July 2011 | Sydney Showground | Performance and meet and greet | IGA Rhymes Festival | 11:30am | |
| 2011 | Australia | Queensland | 15 October 2011 | Cavill Avenue, Surfers Paradise, Gold Coast | Performance and meet and greet | Surfer Paradise Kids Weekend | 5:00pm | |
| 2011 | Australia | Queensland | 16 October 2011 | Cavill Avenue, Surfers Paradise, Gold Coast | Performance and meet and greet | Surfer Paradise Kids Weekend | 2:45pm | |
| 2012 | Australia | New South Wales | 15 July 2012 | Westpoint Blacktown, Blacktown | Performance and signing | Promoting "Sharing Stories 3" DVD | 11:00am | |
| 2012 | Australia | New South Wales | 1 December 2012 | Westfield Warringah Mall, Brookvale | Performance and signing | | 11:00am | |
| 2013 | Australia | New South Wales | 24 January 2013 | Westpoint Blacktown, Blacktown | Performance and meet and greet | | 11:00am | |
| 2013 | Australia | New South Wales | 16 March 2013 | The Entertainment Quarter, Moore Park | Appearance and meet and greet | Premiere of "Some Kind of Wonderful" Movie | 10:00am | |
| 2013 | Australia | New South Wales | 23 March 2013 | Broadway Shopping Centre, Sydney | Appearance and meet and greet | Premiere of "Some Kind of Wonderful" Movie | 10:00am | |
| 2013 | Australia | New South Wales | 24 March 2013 | Westpoint Blacktown, Blacktown | Appearance and meet and greet | Premiere of "Some Kind of Wonderful" Movie | 10:00am | |
| 2013 | Australia | Queensland | 9 April 2013 | Stafford City Shopping Centre, Stafford | Appearance and meet and greet | Premiere of "Some Kind of Wonderful" Movie | 10:00am | |
| 2013 | Australia | Victoria | 13 April 2013 | Chadstone Shopping Centre, Malven East | Appearance and meet and greet | Premiere of "Some Kind of Wonderful" Movie | 10:00am | |
| 2013 | Australia | Victoria | 14 April 2013 | Highpoint Shopping Centre, Maribyrnong | Appearance and meet and greet | Premiere of "Some Kind of Wonderful" Movie | 10:00am | |
| 2013 | Australia | New South Wales | 20 April 2013 | Westfield Penrith, Penrith | Appearance and meet and greet | Premiere of "Some Kind of Wonderful" Movie | 10:00am | |
| 2013 | Australia | New South Wales | 21 April 2013 | Westfield Warringah Mall, Brookvale | Appearance and meet and greet | Premiere of "Some Kind of Wonderful" Movie | 10:00am | |
| 2013 | Australia | New South Wales | 23 April 2013 | Erina Fair, Erina | Appearance and meet and greet | Premiere of "Some Kind of Wonderful" Movie | 10:00am | |
| 2013 | Australia | New South Wales | 27 April 2013 | Westfield Chatswood, Chatswood | Appearance and meet and greet | Premiere of "Some Kind of Wonderful" Movie | 10:00am | |
| 2013 | Australia | New South Wales | 28 April 2013 | Westfield Eastgardens, Eastgardens | Appearance and meet and greet | Premiere of "Some Kind of Wonderful" Movie | 10:00am | |
| 2014 | Australia | New South Wales | 13 April 2014 | Westpoint Blacktown, Blacktown | Performance and meet and greet | Promoting "Dream House" & "So Many Animals" DVDs | 11:00am | |
| 2014 | Philippines | Manila | 7 November 2014 | SM Megamall, Mandaluyong City | Performance and meet and greet | Promoting "Hi-5 House Hits" tour | 2:00pm, 4:00pm | |
| 2014 | Philippines | Manila | 8 November 2014 | SM Megamall, Mandaluyong City | Performance and meet and greet | Promoting "Hi-5 House Hits" tour | 2:00pm, 4:00pm, 6:00pm | |
| 2014 | Philippines | Manila | 9 November 2014 | SM Megamall, Mandaluyong City | Performance and meet and greet | Promoting "Hi-5 House Hits" tour | 2:00pm, 4:00pm, 6:00pm | |
| 2014 | Australia | Victoria | 3 October 2014 | Myer Melbourne, Melbourne | Performance and meet and greet | | 3:00pm | |
| 2014 | Australia | Victoria | 18 November 2014 | Chadstone Shopping Centre, Melbourne | Performances | Chadstone VIP shopping party | 10:30am, 11:30am, 12:30pm | |
| 2014 | Australia | Victoria | 18 November 2014 | Chadstone Shopping Centre, Melbourne | Meet and greet | Chadstone VIP shopping party | 1:00pm | |
| 2015 | Australia | Victoria | 20 May 2015 | Westfield Fountain Gate, Narre Warren | Performance and meet and greet | Promoting "Hi-5 House of Dreams" tour | 11:00am – 12:30pm | |
| 2015 | Australia | Victoria | 21 May 2015 | Westfield Knox, Wantirna South | Performance and meet and greet | Promoting "Hi-5 House of Dreams" tour | 10:00am – 11:30am | |
| 2015 | Australia | Victoria | 21 May 2015 | Westfield Plenty Valley, Mill Park | Performance and meet and greet | Promoting "Hi-5 House of Dreams" tour | 4:00pm – 5:30pm | |
| 2015 | Australia | New South Wales | 22 May 2015 | Westfield Miranda, Miranda | Performance and meet and greet | Promoting "Hi-5 House of Dreams" tour | 10:00am – 11:30am | |
| 2015 | Australia | New South Wales | 22 May 2015 | Westfield North Rocks | Performance and meet and greet | Promoting "Hi-5 House of Dreams" tour | 2:00pm – 3:30pm | |
| 2015 | Australia | New South Wales | 23 May 2015 | Westfield Mt Druitt | Performance and meet and greet | Promoting "Hi-5 House of Dreams" tour | 10:00am – 11:30am | |
| 2015 | Australia | New South Wales | 23 May 2015 | Westfield Warringah Mall, Brookvale | Performance and meet and greet | Promoting "Hi-5 House of Dreams" tour | 2:00pm – 3:30pm | |
| 2015 | Australia | New South Wales | 5 June 2015 | Westfield Chatswood, Chatswood | Performance and meet and greet | Promoting "Hi-5 House of Dreams" tour | 5:00pm | |
| 2015 | Australia | New South Wales | 25 September 2015 | Hordern Pavilion, Moore Park | Performances | Essential Baby & Toddler Show | 12:00pm | |
| 2015 | Australia | New South Wales | 26 September 2015 | Hordern Pavilion, Moore Park | Performances | Essential Baby & Toddler Show | 12:00pm | |
| 2015 | Australia | New South Wales | 27 September 2015 | Hordern Pavilion, Moore Park | Performances | Essential Baby & Toddler Show | 12:00pm | |
| 2015 | Philippines | Manila | 6 November 2015 | SM Megamall, Mandaluyong City | Performance and meet and greet | Promoting "Hi-5 House of Dreams" tour | 11:30am, 3:00pm, 6:30pm | |
| 2015 | Philippines | Manila | 7 November 2015 | SM Megamall, Mandaluyong City | Performance and meet and greet | Promoting "Hi-5 House of Dreams" tour | 11:30am, 3:00pm, 6:30pm | |
| 2015 | Philippines | Manila | 8 November 2015 | SM Megamall, Mandaluyong City | Performance and meet and greet | Promoting "Hi-5 House of Dreams" tour | 11:30am, 6:30pm | |
| 2015 | Australia | Victoria | 14 November 2015 | Myer Melbourne, Melbourne | Appearance | Giftorium Launch | 10:30am | |
| 2015 | Australia | Tasmania | 21 November 2015 | Myer Hobart, Tasmania | Appearance | Christmas concert and parade | 12:30pm | |
| 2015 | Malaysia | Kuala Lumpur | 14 December 2015 | Mid Valley Megamall | Performance and meet and greet | Christmas concert | 10:30am – 12:30pm | |
| 2016 | Australia | Victoria | 1 April 2016 | Royal Exhibition Building, Carlton | Performance and meet and greet | Essential Baby & Toddler Show | 12:00pm | |
| 2016 | Australia | Victoria | 2 April 2016 | Royal Exhibition Building, Carlton | Performance and meet and greet | Essential Baby & Toddler Show | 12:00pm | |
| 2016 | Australia | Victoria | 3 April 2016 | Royal Exhibition Building, Carlton | Performance and meet and greet | Essential Baby & Toddler Show | 12:00pm | |
| 2016 | Australia | New South Wales | 23 September 2016 | Hordern Pavilion, Moore Park | Performance and meet and greet | Essential Baby & Toddler Show | 10:30am | |
| 2016 | Australia | New South Wales | 24 September 2016 | Hordern Pavilion, Moore Park | Performance and meet and greet | Essential Baby & Toddler Show | 10:30am | |
| 2016 | Australia | New South Wales | 25 September 2016 | Hordern Pavilion, Moore Park | Performance and meet and greet | Essential Baby & Toddler Show | 10:30am | |
| 2016 | Malaysia | Kuala Lumpur | 7 December 2016 | Mid Valley Megamall | Performance and meet and greet | Promoting "Hi-5 Fairytale" tour | 10:30am – 11:30am | |
| 2016 | Malaysia | Kuala Lumpur | 8 December 2016 | Mid Valley Megamall | Performance and meet and greet | Promoting "Hi-5 Fairytale" tour | 10:30am – 11:30am | |
| 2017 | Australia | Queensland | 5 March 2017 | Brisbane Convention & Exhibition Centre, Brisbane | Performances and meet and greet | Essential Baby & Toddler Show | 12:30pm | |
| 2017 | Australia | Victoria | 28 April 2017 | Royal Exhibition Building, Carlton | Performances and meet and greet | Essential Baby & Toddler Show | 12:00pm | |
| 2017 | Australia | Victoria | 29 April 2017 | Royal Exhibition Building, Carlton | Performances and meet and greet | Essential Baby & Toddler Show | 12:00pm | |
| 2017 | Australia | Victoria | 30 April 2017 | Royal Exhibition Building, Carlton | Performances and meet and greet | Essential Baby & Toddler Show | 12:00pm | |
| 2017 | Australia | New South Wales | 24 September 2017 | ICC Sydney, Darling Harbour | Performances and meet and greet | Essential Baby & Toddler Show | 11:00am, 1:00pm | |
| 2017 | Australia | Victoria | 25 September 2017 | Melbourne Showgrounds, Melbourne | Performances and meet and greet | Melbourne Royal Show | 10:30am, 1:00pm | |
| 2017 | Australia | Victoria | 26 September 2017 | Melbourne Showgrounds, Melbourne | Performances and meet and greet | Melbourne Royal Show | 10:30am, 1:00pm | |
| 2017 | Australia | Victoria | 27 September 2017 | Melbourne Showgrounds, Melbourne | Performances and meet and greet | Melbourne Royal Show | 10:30am, 1:00pm | |
| 2017 | Australia | Victoria | 28 September 2017 | Melbourne Showgrounds, Melbourne | Performances and meet and greet | Melbourne Royal Show | 10:30am, 1:00pm | |
| 2017 | Australia | Victoria | 29 September 2017 | Melbourne Showgrounds, Melbourne | Performances and meet and greet | Melbourne Royal Show | 10:30am, 1:00pm | |
| 2017 | Australia | Victoria | 30 September 2017 | Melbourne Showgrounds, Melbourne | Performances and meet and greet | Melbourne Royal Show | 10:30am, 1:00pm | |
| 2017 | Australia | Victoria | 1 October 2017 | Melbourne Showgrounds, Melbourne | Performances and meet and greet | Melbourne Royal Show | 10:30am, 1:00pm | |
| 2017 | Australia | Victoria | 2 October 2017 | Melbourne Showgrounds, Melbourne | Performances and meet and greet | Melbourne Royal Show | 10:30am, 1:00pm | |
| 2017 | Australia | Victoria | 3 October 2017 | Melbourne Showgrounds, Melbourne | Performances and meet and greet | Melbourne Royal Show | 10:30am, 1:00pm | |
| 2017 | Australia | New South Wales | 6 October 2017 | Myer Sydney City, Sydney | Appearance and meet and greet | Christmas concert and parade | 11:00am - 12:00pm | |
| 2017 | Australia | New South Wales | 4 November 2017 | Rouse Hill Town Centre, Rouse Hill | Appearance | Christmas concert and parade | 11:00am - 1:00pm | |
| 2017 | Australia | New South Wales | 12 November 2017 | Westfield Eastgardens, Eastgardens | Appearance | Christmas concert and parade | 10:00am | |
| 2017 | Indonesia | Jakarta | 17 November 2017 | Pejaten Village Mall, Pasar Minggu | Performance and meet and greet | | 5:00 pm | |
| 2017 | Indonesia | Jakarta | 18 November 2017 | Ciputra Mall Cibubur | Performance and meet and greet | | 1:00 pm | |
| 2017 | Indonesia | Bandung | 18 November 2017 | Cibinong City Mall | Performance and meet and greet | | 5:00 pm | |
| 2017 | Indonesia | Bekasi | 19 November 2017 | Summarecon Mall, Bekasi | Performance and meet and greet | | 1:00 pm | |
| 2017 | Indonesia | Banten | 19 November 2017 | Summarecon Mall, Serpong | Performance and meet and greet | | 5:00 pm | |
| 2018 | Australia | New South Wales | 26 January 2018 | Parramatta Park, Parramatta | Meet and greet | Australia Day Concert | 12:30pm | |
| 2018 | Australia | New South Wales | 26 January 2018 | Parramatta Park, Parramatta | Performance | Australia Day Concert | 5:00pm | |
| 2018 | Australia | New South Wales | 26 January 2018 | Bella Vista Farm Park, Bella Vista | Performance | Australia Day Concert | 3:00pm | |
| 2018 | Australia | New South Wales | 26 January 2018 | Bella Vista Farm Park, Bella Vista | Meet and greet | Australia Day Concert | 3:20pm | |
| 2018 | Australia | Victoria | 11 February 2018 | St Kilda Festival, St Kilda | Performances | | 10:50am, 1:15pm | |
| 2018 | Australia | Victoria | 11 February 2018 | St Kilda Festival, St Kilda | Meet and greet | | 11:15am, 1:40pm | |
| 2019 | Australia | New South Wales | 26 January 2019 | Bella Vista Farm Park, Bella Vista | Performance | Australia Day Concert | 4:15pm | |
| 2019 | Australia | New South Wales | 19 April 2019 | Werribee Park, Glen Alpine | Performance | Easter Picnic & Egg Hunt | 11:00am | |
