= Balmoral Burn =

Annual foot race in Sydney, Australia

The Balmoral Burn is an annual foot race in Sydney, Australia.

== History ==
Created by former Wallaby captain Phil Kearns, the first Burn was run in 2001, and now an annual event run in May/June each year. Kearns started the race after his son's treatment at Royal North Shore Hospital, it has become a fundraising event for children's health services in Australia and East Timor.

== Location ==
The race is run up Awaba Street, Mosman, Sydney, Australia. Awaba Street is one of Sydney’s steepest streets. The course stretches for 420 metres (1,378 ft) from the Balmoral Beach up to Moruben Road in Mosman.

At its steepest the gradient is nearly 30%, and over its length it rises about 70 metres (230 ft).

According to the Sunday Telegraph, the street has a slope of 20º.

== Participation ==
The Balmoral Burn is fun family day out with races for elite runners, school children, corporate teams, disabled athletes, parents with prams, pets and their owners, and others.

In excess of 1,000 people participate in the Burn each year.

== Winners ==
Year	Male Winner	Country	Time	Female Winner	Country	Time
2024	Luke Boyes	Australia	1' 19"	Bethany Halmy	Australia	1' 39"
2023	Luke Boyes	Australia	1' 21"	Sarah Carli	Australia	1' 40"
2022	Lachlan Raper	Australia	1' 25"	Bethany Halmy	Australia	1' 40"
2021	Event not held due to COVID-19 restrictions					
2020	Event not held due to COVID-19 restrictions					
2019	Mason Cohen	Australia	1' 21"	Bethany Halmy	Australia	1' 36" (=record)
2018	Mason Cohen	Australia	1' 21"	Bethany Halmy	Australia	1' 42"
2017	James Gurr	Australia	1' 18" (record)	Anneliese Rubie	Australia	1' 38"
2016	Mason Cohen	Australia	1' 24"	Suzy Walsham	Australia	1' 41"
2015	James Gurr	Australia	1' 19"	Alicia Keir	Australia	1' 42"
2014	Mason Cohen	Australia	1' 19"	Anneliese Rubie	Australia	1' 36" (record)
2013	Josh Ralph	Australia	1' 26"	Suzy Walsham	Australia	1' 45"
2012	James Gurr	Australia	1' 23"	Frances Schmiede	Australia	1' 45"
2011	James Gurr	Australia	1' 21"	Frances Schmiede	Australia	1' 50"
2010	Lachlan Renshaw	Australia	1' 22"	Anneleise Rubie	Australia	1' 44"
2009	Lachlan Renshaw	Australia	1' 21"	Lara Nicod	Australia	1' 46"
2008	Lachlan Renshaw	Australia	1' 23"	Sianne Toemoe	Australia	1' 46"
2007	Lachlan Renshaw	Australia	1' 22"	Alicia Watkins	Australia	1' 45"
2006	Lachlan Renshaw	Australia	1' 20"	Suzy Walsham	Australia	1' 39"

In the 2012 edition Paralympic champion Kurt Fearnley came first in the Para Burn with a time of five minutes and 26 seconds.

== Fund Raising ==
The event has become an annual fundraising event for the Humpty Dumpty Foundation, a charity providing children’s health services, which buys essential medical equipment for Neonatal Units and Paediatric Wards in hospitals and health service centres across Australia and East Timor.

The money was initially used for basic equipment such as stethoscopes and infant beds, but the program has expanded to buy ambulances and more specialized equipment. Over A$3 million was raised from the Burn in 2012 alone.
