= Ainsley Melham =

Australian actor (born 1991)

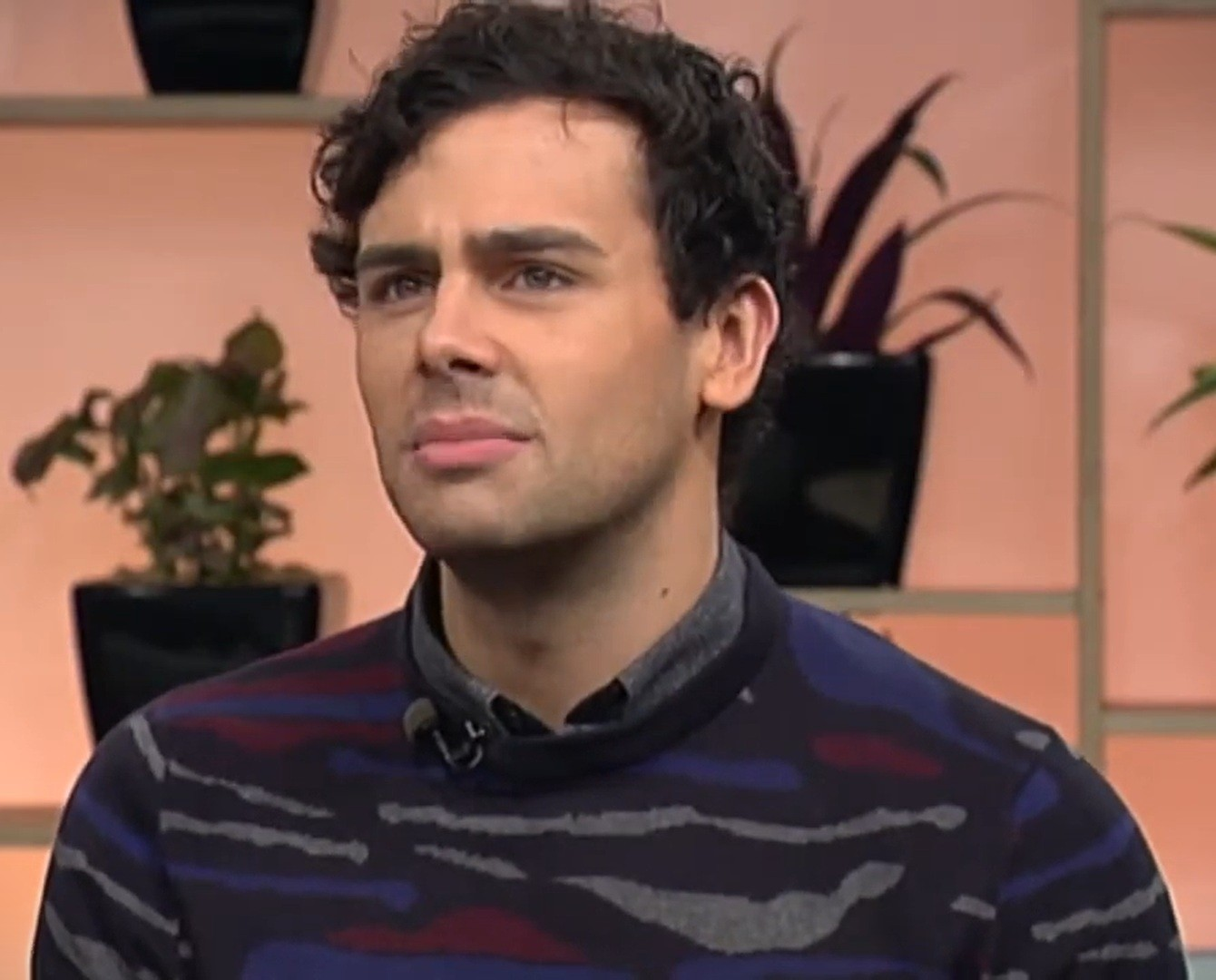
- Melham in 2018
- Born: 2 December 1991 (age 34); Bathurst, New South Wales
- Education: St Stanislaus' College, Western Australian Academy of Performing Arts (WAAPA)
- Occupations: Singer; Actor; Performer
- Years active: 2012–present
- Website: ainsleymelham.com

Ainsley Melham (born 2 December 1991) is an Australian actor and theatre performer. He began his career as a member of Australian children's musical group Hi-5 from 2013 to 2016, starring in the television series and performing in international tours. He later found success as a prominent theatre performer in Australia and the United States.

Melham played the title role in the Australian debut of Disney's Aladdin from 2016 to 2018 and later transferred this role to the Broadway production in 2019. Melham is also known for his starring roles in Australian productions such as Xanadu and Rodgers + Hammerstein's Cinderella, as well as a mid-season replacement for Wicked. He originated the role of Dwayne in the pre-Broadway premiere of Boop! The Musical in 2023, and reprised the role for its Broadway debut in 2025.

Melham was nominated for a Helpmann Award for Best Male Actor in a Musical for his role as Aladdin in 2017.

== Career ==
Ainsley Melham was born in Australia on 2 December 1991, and raised in Bathurst with his sister Nadia. He graduated from Western Australian Academy of Performing Arts (WAAPA), graduating in 2012. He was also educated at the NIDA Open Program, the Australasian Tap Dance Academy and La Belle School of Dance. At WAAPA, Melham performed in a range of musicals, including Ragtime, Violet, Crazy For You, A Chorus Line, Xanadu, How To Succeed in Business Without Really Trying, and Into The Woods.

In January 2013, Melham joined the Australian children's musical group Hi-5 as part of a new generation, after successfully auditioning in late 2012. He starred in the documentary style cinematic release, Some Kind of Wonderful, which depicted the audition process, and appeared in three television series of Hi-5 House. After touring nationally and internationally for three years, Melham departed from the group in January 2016. He stated that he felt it was time to transition back into his theatre roots after "an incredible experience" with Hi-5.

In March 2016, Melham starred as Sonny Malone in an Australian musical production of Xanadu for Matthew Management and Hayes Theatre Co. Later in 2016, he was cast as the title role in Disney Theatrical Company's production of Aladdin in Sydney, Australia. He starred as the title character, Aladdin, and was nominated for a Helpmann Award for Best Male Actor in a Musical. After departing from the Australian cast in late 2018, it was announced that Melham would star in the Broadway production of Aladdin from 19 February 2019 at New Amsterdam Theatre. He rejoined Michael James Scott as Genie, and Arielle Jacobs as Princess Jasmine, the trio who formed the original Australian cast.

In November 2020, Melham played the title role in Pippin at the Sydney Lyric Theatre and in 2022 he played the role of Prince Topher in Rodgers + Hammerstein's Cinderella in Melbourne, Brisbane and Sydney. Melham was cast as Dwayne in the pre-Broadway world premiere of Boop! The Musical, which began previews in November 2023 at the CIBC Theatre in Chicago. In July 2024, he joined the Australian production of Wicked as the Fiyero replacement in Melbourne and Brisbane while original cast member Liam Head was recovering from a knee injury.

== Theatre credits ==
Year	Production	Role	Venue	Dates	Notes	Ref.
2016	Xanadu	Sonny Malone	Hayes Theatre, Sydney	12 May 2016		
2016–2017	Aladdin	Aladdin	Capitol Theatre, Sydney	August 2016 – March 2017	Original Australian cast	
2017–2018	Aladdin	Aladdin	Her Majesty's Theatre, Melbourne	April 2017 – January 2018	Original Australian cast	
2018	Aladdin	Aladdin	Lyric Theatre, QPAC, Brisbane	February – June 2018	Original Australian cast	
2018	Aladdin	Aladdin	Crown Theatre, Perth	July – October 2018	Original Australian cast	
2019	Aladdin	Aladdin	New Amsterdam Theatre, Broadway, New York	February – July 2019	Broadway theatre	
2019	Kiss of the Spider Woman	Molina	Southbank Theatre, Melbourne	18 November – 28 December 2019	Melbourne Theatre Company	
2020	Broadway S'Wonderful	Performer	Ardrie Park, Malvern East, Victoria	15 February 2020	The Stonnington Classics series	
2020	Aladdin	Aladdin	New Amsterdam Theatre, Broadway, New York	Originally scheduled for March 2020	Broadway theatre; did not take place (Note: This production was closed due to the impact of the COVID-19 pandemic on the performing arts, which saw all theatres on Broadway closed until 30 May 2021.)	
2020–2021	Pippin	Pippin	Sydney Lyric Theatre	24 November 2020 – 24 January 2021		
2021	Merrily We Roll Along	Charley Kringas	Hayes Theatre, Sydney	21 October – 4 December 2021		
2022	Watershed: The Death of Dr Duncan	Lost Boy	Dunstan Playhouse, Adelaide Festival Centre	2 – 8 March 2022	World Premiere; State Opera South Australia, 2022 Adelaide Festival	
2022	Rodgers + Hammerstein's Cinderella	Prince Topher	Regent Theatre, Melbourne	20 May – 23 July 2022	Opera Australia	
2022	Rodgers + Hammerstein's Cinderella	Prince Topher	Queensland Performing Arts Centre, Brisbane	5 August – 3 September 2022	Opera Australia	
2022	The Normal Heart	Felix Turner	Dunstan Playhouse, Adelaide Festival Centre	30 September – 15 October 2022	State Theatre Company of South Australia	
2022–2023	Rodgers + Hammerstein's Cinderella	Prince Topher	Sydney Lyric Theatre	23 October 2022 – 29 January 2023	Opera Australia	
2023	To Barbra, with Love	Performer	Canberra Theatre Centre	10 – 11 February 2023		
2023	Disney 100: The Concert	Performer	Concert Hall, Sydney Opera House	23 – 25 February 2023		
2023	Disney Princess: The Concert	Prince	Coca-Cola Arena, Dubai	5 – 7 May 2023		
2023	Boop! The Musical	Dwayne	CIBC Theatre, Chicago	19 November – 31 December 2023	Pre-Broadway world premiere; original cast	
2024	Wicked	Fiyero	Regent Theatre, Melbourne	3 July – 25 August 2024	Melbourne and Brisbane replacement	
2024	Wicked	Fiyero	Lyric Theatre, QPAC, Brisbane	12 September – 24 November 2024	Melbourne and Brisbane replacement	
2025	Boop! The Musical	Dwayne	Broadhurst Theatre, Broadway, New York	11 March – 13 July 2025	Original Broadway cast	
2025–2026	Aladdin	Aladdin	New Amsterdam Theatre, Broadway, New York	26 August 2025 – 1 February 2026	Broadway theatre	
2026	Much Ado About Nothing	Count Claudio	Old Globe Theatre, San Diego	2 – 30 August 2026		

== Filmography ==
Film roles
Year	Title	Role	Note
2013	Hi-5 Some Kind of Wonderful	Self	
TBA	Aladdin: The Broadway Musical	Aladdin	Awaiting release; filmed in August 2019

Television roles
Year	Title	Role	Notes
2013–16	Hi-5 House	Presenter	Series 1 to 3

== Awards and nominations ==
Year	Award	Category	Recipient	Result	Ref.
2016	Glugs Theatrical Awards	Best Actor in Musical Theatre	Ainsley Melham as Aladdin in Aladdin	Nominated	
2016	Glugs Theatrical Awards	Most Outstanding Performance by a Newcomer	Ainsley Melham as Aladdin in Aladdin	Won	
2017	Helpmann Awards	Best Male Actor in a Musical	Ainsley Melham as Aladdin in Aladdin	Nominated	
