= Aladdin (2011 musical) =

Broadway musical, based on the 1992 animated Disney film

- Broadway promotional poster
- Music: Alan Menken
- Lyrics: Howard Ashman; Tim Rice; Chad Beguelin
- Book: Chad Beguelin
- Basis: Aladdin by Ron Clements; John Musker; Ted Elliott; Terry Rossio
- Premiere: July 7, 2011: 5th Avenue Theatre, Seattle
- Productions: 2011 Seattle; 2014 Broadway; 2016 West End; 2016 Australian tour 2017 US Tour; 2022 North American tour 2023 UK & Ireland tour

Aladdin is a stage musical based on the Walt Disney Animation Studios 1992 film of the same name, with a book by Chad Beguelin, music by Alan Menken and lyrics by Howard Ashman, Tim Rice and Beguelin. It resurrects three songs written by Menken and Ashman for the film but not used, and adds four songs written by Menken and Beguelin.

Set in the fictional Arabian city of Agrabah, the story follows the familiar tale of a poor young man who is granted three wishes by a genie in a lamp, which he uses to woo a princess and to thwart the sultan's evil Grand Vizier.

Aladdin premiered at the 5th Avenue Theatre in Seattle in 2011. After several regional and international productions in 2012, the musical was given a Toronto tryout in 2013. The Broadway production opened at the New Amsterdam Theatre on March 20, 2014 to mixed to positive reviews, and has been produced globally since. It is the 7th highest-grossing Broadway production of all time, having grossed over $700 million at the Broadway theatre as of 2026. It has been seen by more than 21 million people worldwide.

== Production history ==
=== Early productions ===
In November 2010, Alan Menken confirmed that a musical theatre adaptation of the movie was in the works with a book written by Chad Beguelin. The musical premiered in Seattle, Washington, at the 5th Avenue Theatre from July 7 to 31, 2011. Jonathan Freeman, who voiced Jafar in the film, reprised the role onstage. Adam Jacobs and Courtney Reed played Aladdin and Jasmine. Additional cast included James Monroe Iglehart as Genie; Sean G. Griffin as Sultan; Don Darryl Rivera as Iago; and Andrew Keenan-Bolger, Brian Gonzales, and Brandon O'Neill as Omar, Kassim and Babkak, a trio of characters conceived for the film but ultimately replaced by Abu. The production was directed and choreographed by Casey Nicholaw. The set designer was Anna Louizos, with costumes designed by Gregg Barnes.

In 2012, productions of the musical played at the Tuacahn Amphitheatre in Ivins, Utah, from June to October 2012 and The Muny in St. Louis in July 2012. Aladdin had its European premiere in Denmark on October 4, 2012, at Fredericia Teater in Fredericia, and was transferred to Copenhagen Opera House on July 19, 2013. It was directed by Lynne Kurdziel-Formato and starred Johannes Nymark as Aladdin, Maria Lucia Rosenberg as Jasmine and Pelle Emil Hebsgaard as Genie. In 2012, Aladdin was staged in Manila at the Meralco Theater. Directed by Bobby Garcia and Chari Arespacochaga, it starred Tom Rodriguez as Aladdin and featured Aiza Seguerra as Genie. The musical was staged in Spanish in Bogotá, Colombia, in 2013.

=== Toronto tryout (2013–2014) ===
Aladdin had a pre-Broadway tryout at the Ed Mirvish Theatre in Toronto, Ontario, from November 2013 to January 2014. Nicholaw, Barnes and Steinmeyer returned as director-choreographer and costume designer, with Bob Crowley replacing Louizos as scenic designer. Special effects were created by Jim Steinmeyer.

=== Broadway (2014–present) ===
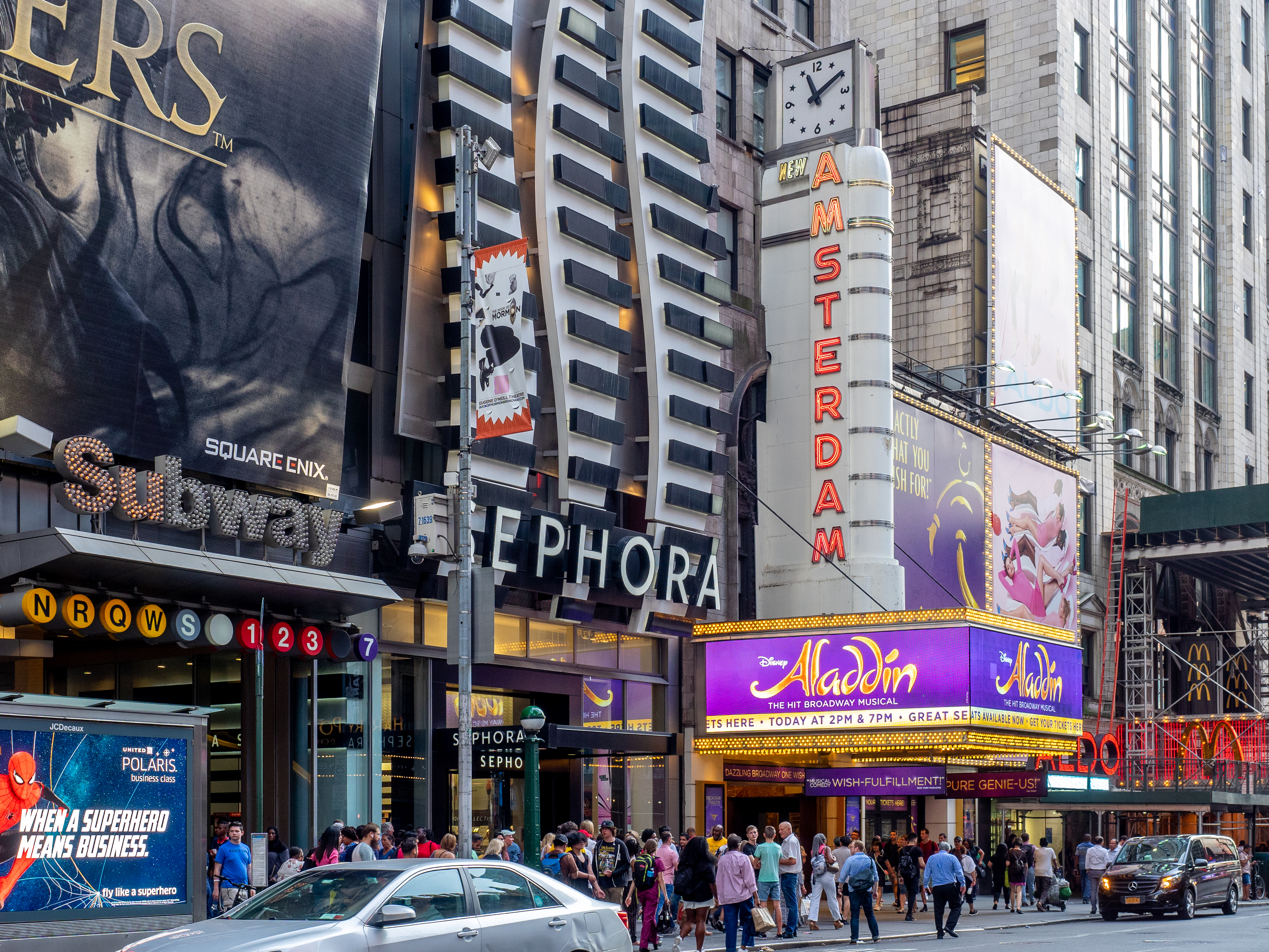
At the New Amsterdam Theatre

The musical premiered on Broadway on February 26, 2014, in previews and opened on March 20, 2014, at the New Amsterdam Theatre. Most of the Seattle main cast remained with the show, including Adam Jacobs as Aladdin, James Monroe Iglehart as Genie, Courtney Reed as Jasmine, Jonathan Freeman as Jafar, Don Darryl Rivera as Iago, Clifton Davis as Sultan, Brian Gonzales as Babkak, and Brandon O'Neill as Kassim. Jonathan Schwartz joined the company as Omar, replacing Andrew Keenan-Bolger. The show was nominated for five Tony Awards, winning one for Best Performance by a Featured Actor in a Musical for James Monroe Iglehart.

On March 12, 2020, the show was suspended due to the COVID-19 pandemic. It resumed performances on September 28, 2021. As of 2026, the Broadway production has played 4,150 performances.

=== Germany (2015–2023) ===
Aladdin premiered on December 6, 2015, at the Neue Flora in Hamburg, in partnership with Stage Entertainment and starring Richard-Salvador Wolff as Aladdin, Enrico De Pieri as Genie, Ethan Freeman as Jafar, and Myrthes Monteiro as Jasmine. The show closed in Hamburg on February 3, 2019, and then was transferred to the Apollo Theater in Stuttgart, where it ran from March 21, 2019, to January 19, 2023.

=== Japan (2015–present) ===
A Japanese production opened in 2015 at the Dentsu Shiki Theatre Umi in Tokyo, presented by the Shiki Theatre Company. The production sold 209,000 tickets on its first day, making it the biggest opening day for a musical in Japan.

=== West End (2016–2019) ===
A West End production officially opened on June 15, 2016, at the Prince Edward Theatre, with previews from May 27, 2016, and starring Dean John-Wilson as Aladdin, Trevor Dion Nicholas as Genie, Jade Ewen as Jasmine, Don Gallagher as Jafar, Peter Howe as Iago, Irvine Iqbal as Sultan, Nathan Amzi as Babkak, Rachid Sabitri as Omar, and Stephen Rahman-Hughes as Kassim. The show closed on August 24, 2019, after being seen by over 2 million people and 1,361 performances.

=== Australia, New Zealand, and Singapore (2016–2019) ===
Aladdin had its Australian premiere in Sydney at the Capitol Theatre on August 11, 2016, played until February 19, 2017. Australian actor Ainsley Melham originated the role of Aladdin alongside American actors Arielle Jacobs as Princess Jasmine and Michael James Scott as Genie. Following performances in Sydney, Aladdin opened at Her Majesty's Theatre in Melbourne on April 15, 2017. The Sydney and Melbourne productions performed an autism-friendly adaptation of the show which had the "removal of strobe lighting and pyrotechnics, reduction of any jarring sounds and house lights being dimmed (instead of off)" to provide a more supportive environment for autistic patrons. In 2018, the Australian tour included stops at Brisbane and Perth. In 2019, the show then transferred to a New Zealand production, playing Auckland, before a run at the Adelaide Festival Theatre in Adelaide in April. It transferred to Singapore to conclude its tour on September 1, 2019.

On February 15 and 19, 2019, respectively, Michael James Scott and Ainsley Melham transferred to the Broadway company of the show, where they were reunited with Arielle Jacobs who had joined the Broadway cast in February 2018. This casting decision made the Broadway leads the same as the leads of the original Australian cast.

=== US tour (2017–2020) ===
Disney Theatrical launched a national tour on April 11, 2017, at Chicago's Cadillac Palace Theatre.

=== The Netherlands (2021–2023) ===
Stage Entertainment announced a Dutch language production for the fall of 2020 at the AFAS Circustheater in The Hague, but it was delayed due to the COVID-19 pandemic. The show finally premiered on September 26, 2021, with Jonathan Vroege as Aladdin, Stanley Burleson as Genie, and Keoma Aidhen as Jasmine. Keoma Aidhen had previously played the role of Jasmine in Germany, making her the first performer to play the role in two different languages. The production closed on February 26, 2023.

=== Mexico (2021–2023) ===
The first Spanish language production opened on November 17, 2021, at the Teatro Telcel in Mexico City, starring Rodney Ingram as Aladdin, Juan Pablo Martínez as Genie and Irma Flores as Jasmine. The production closed on April 16, 2023.

=== North American tour (2022–2024) ===
A tour across the United States and Canada began on October 11, 2022, in Schenectady.

=== Spain (2023–2025) ===
Another Spanish language production premiered on March 23, 2023, at the Coliseum Theatre in Madrid, produced by Stage Entertainment and starring Roc Bernadí as Aladdin, David Comrie as Genie and Jana Gómez as Jasmine. The production closed on July 20, 2025.

=== UK & Ireland tour (2023–2025) ===
The first UK & Ireland tour opened on October 28, 2023 at the Edinburgh Playhouse and closed on January 5, 2025 at the Liverpool Empire Theatre.

=== South Korea (2024–2025) ===
A Korean language production opened on November 22, 2024, at the Charlotte Theater in Seoul. The show closed in Seoul on June 22, 2025, and then was transferred to Busan's Dream Theatre from July 11 to September 28, 2025.

== Plot ==
=== Act I ===
A man welcomes the audience to the Middle Eastern city of Agrabah. He notes that Agrabah is a diverse place, full of revered nobles, misfits, and even a few villains ("Arabian Nights").

Aladdin is a young man who spends his days stealing food from the street vendors of Agrabah along with his three best friends, Kassim, Omar and Babkak ("One Jump Ahead"). After being referred to as a "worthless street rat", Aladdin expresses his dreams of showing the world he's more than just a common urchin ("One Jump Ahead (Reprise)"). He notes his guilt in thievery, having vowed to never steal again after the death of his mother ("Proud of Your Boy").

Meanwhile, in the palace of Agrabah, Princess Jasmine is scolded by her father, the Sultan, for refusing yet another suitor. The Sultan demands that Jasmine must marry a noble prince before her birthday, which is only three days away. Jasmine laments the situation to her handmaidens ("These Palace Walls"). This news also disturbs the Sultan's Grand Vizier, Jafar, who wishes to usurp the throne himself. He and his assistant, Iago, search for a way to enter the "Cave of Wonders", a mysterious cavern in the desert said to hold untold power. The voice of the cave reveals that only one who is worthy, a "diamond in the rough", may enter. When Jafar asks about the identity of this "diamond in the rough", it is revealed to be Aladdin. Jafar and Iago set out to find him.

While entertaining the locals ("Babkak, Omar, Aladdin, Kassim"), Aladdin meets Jasmine, who has disguised herself as a commoner to get a sense of life outside the palace. Aladdin has no idea who she is, but he is immediately smitten. After a brief scuffle with the guards, he takes Jasmine to his hideout, where they each reveal their unhappiness in their own lives ("A Million Miles Away"). They are discovered by the guards and Jasmine is escorted back to the palace. Aladdin is ordered to be killed, but he is saved by Jafar and Iago, who lead Aladdin to the Cave of Wonders ("Diamond in the Rough"). Grateful for saving his life, Aladdin honours Jafar's request to enter the cave.

Once inside, Aladdin is instructed to bring the magic lamp to Jafar and touch nothing else. Astonished by all the treasure buried within the cave, Aladdin attempts to take the Egyptian chain along with the lamp. The cave angrily seals itself, trapping Aladdin inside. Engulfed in darkness, Aladdin rubs the lamp which, to his surprise, unleashes a magical Genie (revealed as the man from the beginning of the show) who offers to grant him three wishes. Aladdin initially shrugs this off in disbelief, prompting the Genie to display his powers with a musical number ("Friend Like Me"). The Genie then reveals that he has limitations to his powers. He can not grant wishes that include murder, romance, the revival of the dead, or wishing for additional wishes. Amused and overjoyed at his good fortune, Aladdin tricks Genie into magically freeing them from the cave without actually using a wish; thereafter, Genie states that Aladdin will not receive any more magic help unless he explicitly states "I wish". After Aladdin asks what Genie would wish for, Genie muses that he would wish for freedom since he is a prisoner of his lamp, so Aladdin promises to use his last wish to free Genie. Aladdin decides to use his first wish to become a prince in order to be legally able to court Jasmine (Act One Finale: "Friend Like Me"/"Proud of Your Boy" (Reprises)).

=== Act II ===
A great parade storms through the streets of Agrabah, led by Genie, Babkak, Omar and Kassim. They announce the arrival of "Prince Ali of Ababwa" ("Prince Ali"). Once at the palace, Aladdin, disguised as Prince Ali, expresses to the Sultan his desire to marry Jasmine. Jasmine overhears the conversation and perceives Ali to be just another shallow prince. Jafar, who is suspicious of Ali, tells him the location of Jasmine's bedroom, not mentioning that it is against Agrabah law for the Princess to have a suitor in her quarters unsupervised. Aladdin courts Jasmine with a ride on his magic carpet provided to him by Genie ("A Whole New World"). Once they return, Jasmine recognizes Aladdin as the young man whom she met in the marketplace. Aladdin lies and says that he really is a prince, he just sometimes likes to dress as a commoner to escape the pressures of palace living, much like Jasmine did that day. Seeing he isn't shallow and self-absorbed like the others, Jasmine kisses Aladdin good night. After she leaves, Jafar has Aladdin arrested for entering the Princess' room unsupervised. Upon hearing the news, Babkak, Omar and Kassim storm the palace to rescue their friend ("High Adventure"). They are captured and thrown into the dungeon as well, but with a little help from Genie, Aladdin uses his second wish to free them ("Somebody's Got Your Back").

The Sultan greets Aladdin in the hall and gives him his blessing to marry Jasmine, meaning that Aladdin himself will inherit the throne as the new Sultan one day. Fearful of this great responsibility, he tells Genie he's going to save his third wish for a day he may need it rather than use it to free Genie like he promised. Distraught, Genie returns to his lamp and refuses to speak to Aladdin. Aladdin laments ("Proud of Your Boy" (Reprise II)). Meanwhile, Jafar and Iago manage to steal the lamp that Aladdin carelessly discarded.

As the Sultan announces to the public that Jasmine is to wed Prince Ali ("Prince Ali" (Sultan Reprise)), Jafar appears and reveals Ali to be merely a common street rat named Aladdin whom the former then threatens to send to "the end of the road" if no one changes the latter's personality to meet his standards ("Prince Ali" (Jafar Reprise)). Genie then enters with Jasmine in chains, saying that Jafar is now his master and that his first wish was to make Jasmine his prisoner. Jafar uses his second wish to crown himself Sultan, which Genie reluctantly grants. Remembering what Genie told him earlier about the limitations to his powers, Aladdin tricks Jafar into wishing for himself to become a genie so that his power will be unmatched. Genie grants Jafar's wish, and Jafar is sucked into a lamp of his own, bound to it for eternity.

Aladdin uses his third and final wish to set Genie free. He then admits to Jasmine that he loves her, but he cannot pretend to be someone he's not. Seeing the nobility in Aladdin, the Sultan decrees that henceforth the Princess can marry whomever she pleases. Babkak, Omar and Kassim are made royal advisors, while Iago is arrested. Aladdin and Jasmine are married, and Genie prepares for a long-awaited vacation. All ends well as Aladdin and Jasmine board the magic carpet and take flight (Finale Ultimo: "Arabian Nights"/"A Whole New World" (Reprises)).

== Casting controversy ==
Although the film was Disney's first to feature non-white human protagonists, Disney did not consider ethnicity in the casting process for the musical. This 'colourblind' policy sparked some controversy, with the American Arab Anti-Discrimination Committee receiving numerous complaints from actors of Middle Eastern descent. The executive director of a US minority rights organisation lamented that the production had 'missed an opportunity' to showcase Arab-American actors, who remain underrepresented on Broadway.

== Roles and principal cast members ==
=== Original casts ===
Character	Broadway	West End	Australian tour	North American tour	North American tour	UK Tour
Character	2014	2016	2016	2017	2022	2023
Aladdin	Adam Jacobs	Dean John-Wilson	Ainsley Melham	Adam Jacobs	Adi Roy	Gavin Adams
Genie	James Monroe Iglehart	Trevor Dion Nicholas	Michael James Scott	Anthony Murphy	Marcus M. Martin	Yeukayi Ushe
Jasmine	Courtney Reed	Jade Ewen	Arielle Jacobs	Isabelle McCalla	Senzel Ahmady	Desmonda Cathabel
Jafar	Jonathan Freeman	Don Gallagher	Adam Murphy	Jonathan Weir	Anand Nagraj	Adam Strong
Iago	Don Darryl Rivera	Peter Howe	Aljin Abella	Reggie De Leon	Aaron Choi	Angelo Paragoso
Sultan	Clifton Davis	Irvine Iqbal	George Henare	J. C. Montgomery	Sorab Wadia	Jo Servi
Babkak	Brian Gonzales	Nathan Amzi	Troy Sussman	Zach Bencal	Jake Letts	Nelson Bettencourt
Omar	Jonathan Schwartz	Rachid Sabitri	Robert Tripolino	Philippe Arroyo	Ben Chavez	Adam Taylor
Kassim	Brandon O'Neill	Stephen Rahman-Hughes	Adam Jon Fiorentino	Mike Longo	Colt Prattes	Nay-Nay

=== Notable cast replacements ===
Broadway

- Aladdin: Telly Leung, Michael Maliakel, Ainsley Melham, Josh Dela Cruz
- Genie: Michael James Scott, Sherri Shepherd
- Jasmine: Arielle Jacobs, Isabelle McCalla
- Iago: Alan Muraoka

US tour

- Aladdin: Ainsley Melham
- Genie: Michael James Scott, Trevor Dion Nicholas
- Jasmine: Courtney Reed

West End

- Genie: Michael James Scott
- Jasmine: Courtney Reed

== Musical numbers ==
Three songs that were cut from the 1992 film following the death of Howard Ashman were restored for the musical, as noted below. Four others were newly written for the musical, as noted. All music is by Alan Menken. Lyricists are listed for the individual songs.

Act I

- "Overture"
- "Arabian Nights" (Ashman/Rice) *** – Genie, Company *****
- "One Jump Ahead" (Rice) – Aladdin, Ensemble
- "One Jump Ahead (Reprise)" (Rice) – Aladdin
- "Proud of Your Boy" (Ashman) * – Aladdin
- "These Palace Walls" (Beguelin) ** – Jasmine, Attendants
- "Babkak, Omar, Aladdin, Kassim" (Ashman)* – Babkak, Omar, Aladdin, Kassim, Ensemble
- "A Million Miles Away" (Beguelin) ** – Aladdin, Jasmine
- "Diamond in the Rough" (Beguelin) ** – Jafar, Iago, Aladdin
- "Friend Like Me" (Ashman) – Genie, Aladdin, Ensemble
- Act One Finale (Friend Like Me (Reprise) (Ashman)/Proud of Your Boy (Reprise I)) (Beguelin) ** – Genie, Aladdin

Act II

- "Prince Ali" (Ashman) **** – Genie, Babkak, Omar, Kassim, Ensemble
- "A Whole New World" (Rice) – Aladdin, Jasmine
- "High Adventure" (Ashman)* – Babkak, Omar, Kassim, Ensemble
- "Somebody's Got Your Back" (Beguelin) ** – Aladdin, Genie, Babkak, Omar, Kassim
- "Proud of Your Boy (Reprise II)" (Beguelin) ** – Aladdin
- "Prince Ali (Sultan Reprise)" (Beguelin) ** – Sultan, Ensemble
- "Prince Ali (Jafar Reprise)" (Rice) – Jafar
- Finale Ultimo ("Arabian Nights (Reprise)" (Ashman/Beguelin) * / "A Whole New World (Reprise)" (Rice)) – Genie, Aladdin, Jasmine, Company ****

(*) This song was cut from the movie and restored for the musical.
(**) This is a new song written for the musical.
(***) This song uses the edit to Ashman's lyric which was intended to resolve a controversy with the original film.
(****) The Genie's part in this song was performed by Babkak, Omar, and Kassim in the Seattle and Vancouver productions.
(*****) A longer arrangement similar to the original demo, with Howard Ashman's original lyrics, is used for this song. However, the shorter arrangement from the film, albeit without some of the changes made to Ashman's original lyrics, was used for the Seattle and Toronto productions.

Cut Songs

- "Arabian Nights (Reprise 1)", "Arabian Nights (Reprise 2)", "Arabian Nights (Reprise 3)" (Ashman**/Beguelin***) – Babkak, Omar, Kassim
- "Call Me a Princess" (Ashman**) – Jasmine and Attendants
- "Call Me a Princess (Reprise)" (Beguelin***) – Jasmine
- "High Adventure (Reprise)" (Beguelin***) – Babkak, Omar, Kassim
- "Somebody's Got Your Back (Reprise)" (Beguelin***) – Genie
- "Why Me" (Rice/Beguelin*) – Jafar and Iago

(*) This song was cut from the movie, restored for the musical, but later cut from the Seattle production.
(**) This song was cut from the movie, restored for the musical, but later cut from the Toronto production.
(***) This song was written for the Seattle production, but later cut from the Toronto production.

== Instrumentation ==
Aladdin was originally orchestrated by Danny Troob for 18 players: 2 synthesizers, 2 violins, 1 cello, 3 trumpets, 1 French Horn, 1 trombone, 1 bass trombone, 3 woodwind players, a guitarist, a bass player (both acoustic and electric bass), a drum kit and a percussion player. The National Tour, West End and Hamburg productions of the show had 15 musicians. The electronic music software KeyComp was first introduced in the Stuttgart production (10 players) as well as the Dutch, the Mexican and the UK Tour productions of the show (8 players).

== Recordings ==
=== Cast recording ===
An original Broadway cast recording was released on May 27, 2014, through Walt Disney Records and peaked at number 45 on the Billboard 200.

All music is composed by Alan Menken.

Original Broadway Cast Recording (2014)
No.	Title	Lyrics	Performer(s)	Length
1.	"Overture"	Howard Ashman		1:16
2.	"Arabian Nights"	Ashman & Tim Rice	James Monroe Iglehart, Ensemble	6:16
3.	"One Jump Ahead"	Rice	Adam Jacobs, Ensemble	2:09
4.	"One Jump Ahead (Reprise)"	Rice	Jacobs	0:36
5.	"Proud of Your Boy"	Ashman	Jacobs	2:20
6.	"These Palace Walls"	Chad Beguelin	Courtney Reed, Tia Altinay, Khori Michelle Petinaud, Marisha Wallace	2:40
7.	"Babkak, Omar, Aladdin, Kassim"	Ashman	Jacobs, Brian Gonzales, Jonathan Schwartz, Brandon O'Neill, Ensemble	3:48
8.	"A Million Miles Away"	Beguelin	Jacobs, Reed	3:21
9.	"Diamond in the Rough"	Beguelin	Jacobs, Jonathan Freeman, Don Darryl Rivera	4:18
10.	"Friend Like Me"	Ashman	Iglehart, Jacobs, Ensemble	7:32
11.	"Act One Finale"	Ashman & Beguelin	Iglehart, Jacobs	2:08
12.	"Prince Ali"	Ashman	Gonzales, Schwartz, O'Neill, Iglehart, Ensemble	5:55
13.	"A Whole New World"	Rice	Jacobs, Reed	4:07
14.	"High Adventure"	Ashman	Gonzales, Schwartz, O'Neill, Ensemble	5:31
15.	"Somebody's Got Your Back"	Beguelin	Iglehart, Jacobs, Gonzales, Schwartz, O'Neill	3:24
16.	"Proud of Your Boy (Reprise)"	Ashman	Jacobs	1:05
17.	"Prince Ali (Sultan Reprise)"	Beguelin	Clifton Davis, Ensemble	1:13
18.	"Prince Ali (Jafar Reprise)"	Rice	Freeman	1:04
19.	"Finale Ultimo"	Ashman, Rice, Beguelin	Company	2:46
20.	"Proud of Your Boy (Piano Version)" (bonus track)	Ashman	Jacobs, Menken	2:42
21.	"Genie Medley" (bonus track)	Ashman, David Zippel	Menken, Jacobs, Iglehart	4:03

=== Filmed West End stage production ===
A special performance of Aladdin was filmed on location at the Prince Edward Theatre in London on August 31, 2019, after the show had already officially closed on August 24, 2019. The filmed production starred performers from the original Broadway, West End, Australian and US Tour productions: Ainsley Melham as Aladdin, Trevor Dion Nicholas as Genie, Isabelle McCalla as Jasmine, Brian Gonzales as Babkak, Brandon O'Neill as Kassim, Robert Tripolino as Omar, Irvine Iqbal as the Sultan, Don Darryl Rivera as Iago and Jonathan Freeman as Jafar.

It was originally set to premiere exclusively on Disney+ in 2022, on the 30th anniversary of the original 1992 film, but the release date was pushed back until further notice.

== Reception ==
=== Toronto tryout ===
The pre-Broadway production in Toronto received mixed reviews. The National Post review said "This Aladdin turns out to be the best ever stage version of a movie", praising its score, direction, choreography, staging, lighting, design, and altered characterisations. CHCH said "Artistically, this Aladdin is top grade. It will become a classic." The Globe and Mail reviewer gave the show 2.5 stars out of 4, however, saying that it was "strictly for the kiddies". The Toronto Star gave the musical the same rating, and said "You're likely to hear the sound of deafening applause [during the] show-stopping staging of 'A Friend Like Me' and James Monroe Iglehart's blessedly bravura performance as the Genie. It's the kind of exhilarating moment we go to the theatre for. But ... nothing before or after it in Aladdin lives up to those six sublime minutes."

The Vancouver Sun said "Director Casey Nicholaw has served up a thoroughly satisfying confection for kids, who will no doubt delight in the swords, smoke and spectacular tunes of Aladdin – and will leave the theatre content to have been transported to 'a whole new world'. Their parents? Maybe not so much." The website BroadwayWorld said "the show had the unbelievable sights but sadly struggled with the indescribable feelings", adding "The problem is, Chad Beguelin's book fails to make us truly care for the characters – and the special effects can only take the show so far when the investment at the heart of the story isn't making the connection it should. It felt as though the book concentrated too hard on adding cheesy 'current affair' style jokes ... and clunky one-liners instead of giving depth and material to Aladdin, Jasmine and the Genie." The Toronto Sun said: "In short, it's a visual assault that doesn't so much draw one in as simply sweep one up in an overly long first act . ... With the exception of Iglehart's gigantically genial Genie, there is no character in which an audience can make an emotional investment – no quiet moment that might allow any of the characters, good or evil, to exist in three dimensions."

=== Broadway ===
The Broadway production received mixed to positive reviews from critics. Mark Kennedy of the Associated Press gave the production a rave review, writing: "It's spritely ... well sung ... and hits that sweet spot Disney Theatrical Productions do so well, a saccharine fairy tale for the kids cut by some sly, vinegary quips for their parents." Elysa Gardener of USA Today gave the show 3.5 out of four stars and said, "If Disney Theatrical's latest production doesn't sustain that frenzied high throughout, it delivers a rush that may surprise folks who attend either as chaperones or to relive their own youths." Thom Grier of Entertainment Weekly gave the show a "B" and said, "Overall, this is one of the better Disney stage musicals, complete with several eye-popping production numbers that benefit from Nicholaw's spirited choreography, Bob Crowley's elaborate and chameleonic sets, and Gregg Barnes' glittery costumes."

Terry Teachout of The Wall Street Journal praised Iglehart's performance, especially during the number "Friend Like Me" but wrote: "The trouble is that nothing else in the first act can touch it. Adam Jacobs and Courtney Reed, who play Aladdin and his princess, are pretty but bland, and the temperature doesn't start rising again until the magic-carpet ride, which comes after intermission and is the slickest thing to hit Broadway since the flying car in Chitty Chitty Bang Bang. From then on, Aladdin becomes fun". Charles Isherwood of The New York Times was mostly positive in his review, writing that "this latest musical adapted from one of Disney's popular movies ... defied my dour expectations. As directed and choreographed [by] Nicholaw, and adapted by ... Beguelin, Aladdin has an infectious and only mildly syrupy spirit. Not to mention enough baubles, bangles and beading to keep a whole season of RuPaul's Drag Race contestants in runway attire." Marilyn Stasio of Variety gave the show a negative review, commenting: "The magic-carpet ride is magical. The Cave of Wonders is wonderful. And yes, you'll hear the tunes you loved in the 1992 movie. But the notion that Disney Aladdin somehow resurrects the spirit of the late Howard Ashman, who had the original inspiration for the movie and contributed most of its clever lyrics, is a joke. Restoring a person's work without respecting his artistic sensibility is no tribute at all."

== Awards and nominations ==
=== Original Broadway production ===
Year	Award	Category	Nominee	Result
2014	Tony Award	Best Musical		Nominated
2014	Tony Award	Best Book of a Musical	Chad Beguelin	Nominated
2014	Tony Award	Best Original Score	Alan Menken, Howard Ashman, Tim Rice and Chad Beguelin	Nominated
2014	Tony Award	Best Performance by a Featured Actor in a Musical	James Monroe Iglehart	Won
2014	Tony Award	Best Choreography	Casey Nicholaw	Nominated
2014	Drama Desk Award	Outstanding Musical		Nominated
2014	Drama Desk Award	Outstanding Book of a Musical	Chad Beguelin	Nominated
2014	Drama Desk Award	Outstanding Music	Alan Menken	Nominated
2014	Drama Desk Award	Outstanding Lyrics	Howard Ashman, Tim Rice and Chad Beguelin	Nominated
2014	Drama Desk Award	Outstanding Actor in a Musical	Adam Jacobs	Nominated
2014	Drama Desk Award	Outstanding Featured Actor in a Musical	James Monroe Iglehart	Won
2014	Drama Desk Award	Outstanding Choreography	Casey Nicholaw	Nominated
2014	Outer Critics Circle Award	Outstanding Book Of A Musical		Nominated
2014	Outer Critics Circle Award	Outstanding Choreographer	Casey Nicholaw	Nominated
2014	Outer Critics Circle Award	Outstanding Costume Design	Gregg Barnes	Nominated
2014	Outer Critics Circle Award	Outstanding Featured Actor in a Musical	James Monroe Iglehart	Nominated
2014	Outer Critics Circle Award	Outstanding Lighting Design	Natasha Katz	Nominated
2014	Outer Critics Circle Award	Outstanding New Broadway Musical		Nominated
2014	Outer Critics Circle Award	Outstanding New Score (Marjorie Gunner Award)		Nominated
2014	Outer Critics Circle Award	Outstanding Set Design	Bob Crowley	Nominated
2015	Grammy Award	Best Musical Theater Album		Nominated

=== Original London production ===
Year	Award	Category	Nominee	Result
2017	Laurence Olivier Awards	Best Set Design	Bob Crowley	Nominated

=== Original Australian production ===
Year	Award	Category	Nominee	Result
2016	Glugs Theatrical Awards	Most Outstanding Mainstage Musical		Won
2016	Glugs Theatrical Awards	Best Actor in Musical Theatre	Michael James Scott	Nominated
2016	Glugs Theatrical Awards	Best Actor in Musical Theatre	Ainsley Melham	Nominated
2016	Glugs Theatrical Awards	Most Outstanding Performance by a Newcomer	Ainsley Melham	Won
2017	Helpmann Awards	Best Musical		Nominated
2017	Helpmann Awards	Best Choreography in a Musical	Casey Nicholaw	Nominated
2017	Helpmann Awards	Best Direction of a Musical	Casey Nicholaw	Nominated
2017	Helpmann Awards	Best Male Actor in a Musical	Ainsley Melham	Nominated
2017	Helpmann Awards	Best Male Actor in a Supporting Role in a Musical	Michael James Scott	Won
2017	Helpmann Awards	Best Set Design	Bob Crowley	Nominated
2017	Helpmann Awards	Best Costume Design	Gregg Barnes	Won

== See also ==
- Aladdin (franchise)
- Aladdin Jr.: another stage adaptation of Aladdin, made specially for youth theatre.
- Twisted: A musical parody of Aladdin, telling the story from Jafar's perspective.
