= Courtney Reed =

American actress (born 1984)

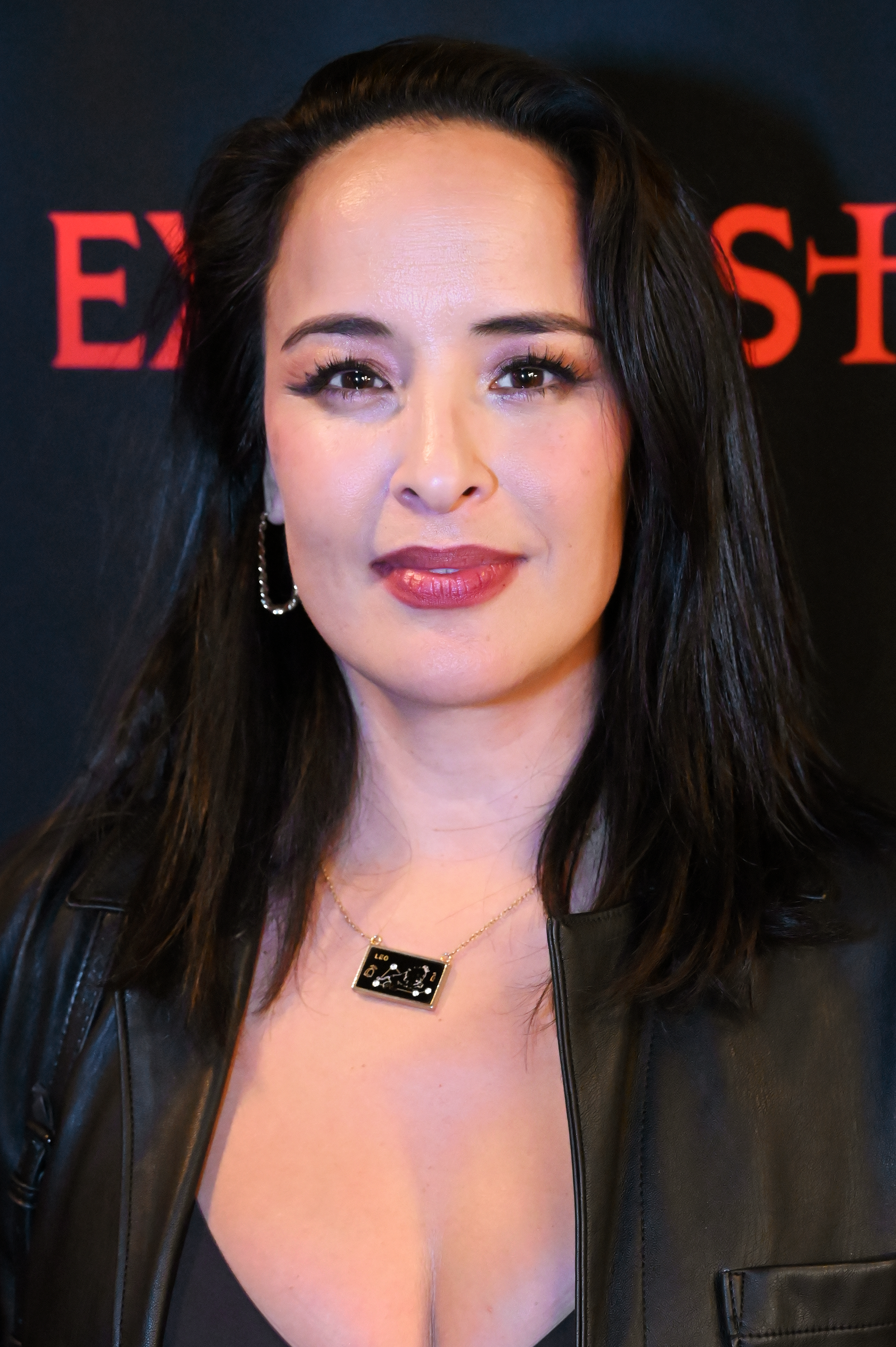
- Reed in 2025
- Born: August 10, 1984 (age 41); Elgin, Illinois, U.S.
- Education: Roosevelt University's Chicago College of Performing Arts
- Occupations: Singer, actress
- Years active: 2005–present

Courtney Rhodes Reed (born August 10, 1984) is an American singer and actress, best known for originating the role of Princess Jasmine in Disney's Aladdin on Broadway.

== Early life ==
Reed was born and raised in Elgin, Illinois to a Caucasian American father and a mother of Vietnamese descent who was born and raised in Thailand. She began performing at age 6, playing a mouse in Children's Theatre of Elgin's production of Cinderella. She was later cast as the title role in a community production of Annie, which inspired her to pursue theater as a professional career. She studied at the Chicago College of Performing Arts at Roosevelt University as a Musical Theatre Major, also participating in their theatre conservatory. She considered moving to LA, believing Broadway success could only start with television fame. However, she was quickly cast in roles on the stage.

== Career ==
Reed performed on Broadway as a replacement understudy for Lisa and Ali in the musical Mamma Mia! She also appeared in In The Heights, performing as the understudy/replacement for the roles of Vanessa, Nina, and Carla in the final Broadway cast.

In 2011, she began performing in the original cast of the musical Aladdin as Princess Jasmine at the 5th Avenue Theatre in Seattle. In 2012, the musical put on several regional and international productions, and was given a Toronto tryout the following year. Reed stayed in the role of Princess Jasmine when Aladdin opened on Broadway at the New Amsterdam Theatre on March 20, 2014, and took her final bow on January 11, 2018. She later went on to reprise the role in the North American Tour for a limited engagement, and once again in the West End production as part of its closing cast in 2019. Reed returned to the Broadway production for a limited engagement beginning October 16, 2019 and took her final bow as Princess Jasmine on October 27, 2019.

In September 2021 she was cast as Satine in the North American touring cast of Moulin Rouge! The Musical, starring alongside Conor Ryan as Christian. She assumed the role on Broadway beginning August 1, 2023 opposite Casey Cott as Christian.

Other roles include the role of Candy 1 in the 2007 film Crime Fiction and Ryder in the 2014 film A New York Love Story.

Reed's TV appearances include Law & Order: SVU as the villainous Alana Gonzalez in the episode "Above Suspicion." She also appeared in episodes of White Collar and The Affair.

Reed is also the creator of the company Gagged Chokers. The company features a collection of chokers themed by seasons and holidays, among others.

== Filmography ==
Film credits
Year	Title	Role	Notes
2005	Bargain Basement	Lisa	Short film
2006	Her	Angela	Short film
2007	Crime Fiction	Candy 1	
2015	A New York Love Story	Ryder	
2019	Endings, Beginnings	Lauren	

Television credits
Year	Title	Role	Notes
2011	Fake Henrik Zetterberg	Lizzette	Episode: "This Picture Thing"
2012	NYC 22	Rachelle	Episode: "Playing God"
2012	Law & Order: Special Victims Unit	Officer Alana Gonzalez	Episode: "Above Suspicion"
2013	White Collar	Kyle Bringham	Episode: "Brass Tacks"
2011–2014	Submissions Only	Deborah Lee	6 Episodes
2015	The Affair	Attractive Woman	Episode: "208"
2016	Search Party	Receptionist	Episode: "The Mystery of the Golden Charm"
2019	Liza on Demand	Megan	Episode: "Naked"

== Stage credits ==
Year	Title	Role	Venue	Ref.
2007	Mamma Mia!	Ensemble	Broadway, Broadhurst Theatre	
2011	In The Heights	Carla	Broadway, Richard Rodgers Theatre	
2011	Aladdin	Princess Jasmine	Regional, 5th Avenue Theatre, Seattle, Washington	
2012	Once on This Island	Andrea	Regional, Paper Mill Playhouse	
2013	Aladdin	Princess Jasmine	Pre-Broadway Tryout, Ed Mirvish Theatre, Toronto, Canada	
2014	Aladdin	Princess Jasmine	Broadway, New Amsterdam Theatre	
2017	Aladdin	Princess Jasmine	U.S. National Tour	
2019	Aladdin	Princess Jasmine	West End, Prince Edward Theatre	
2019	Aladdin	Princess Jasmine	Broadway, New Amsterdam Theatre	
2020	Cambodian Rock Band	Neary/Sothea	Off-Broadway, Signature Theatre Company	
2022	Moulin Rouge!	Satine	U.S. National Tour	
2023	Moulin Rouge!	Satine	Broadway, Al Hirschfeld Theatre	
2025	Reunions	Lady Sims	Off-Broadway, City Center Stage 2	
