= Adam Jacobs =

American actor and singer

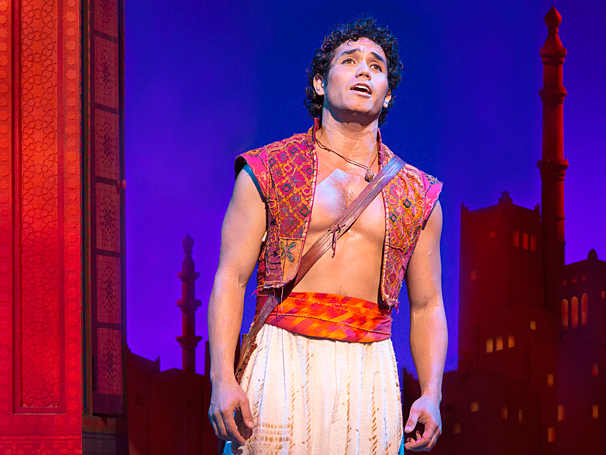
- Adam Jacobs as Aladdin in 2014
- Born: May 17, 1979 (age 47); Half Moon Bay, California, U.S.
- Education: New York University (BFA)
- Occupations: Actor, singer
- Years active: 2004–present
- Spouse: Kelly Kohnert
- Children: 2
- Website: adamjacobs.net

Adam Jacobs (born May 17, 1979) is an American Broadway artist. He is best known for originating the title role of Aladdin in Disney's Aladdin on Broadway. He also starred as Marius in the Les Misérables 2006 Broadway revival, Simba in Disney's The Lion King and most recently as Captain Walker in The Who's Tommy.

== Background ==
Born in Half Moon Bay, California, in 1979, Jacobs initially studied piano at the San Francisco Conservatory of Music, beginning at the age of 5. He played the instrument for eight years and later found an interest in musical theater. Jacobs performed in local community theater and high school productions. To accumulate additional training, he also attended the summer programs of the American Conservatory Theater (ACT) in downtown SF and the California Institute of the Arts (CSSSA) in Valencia, California. When a representative from the San Francisco Opera saw him star in his high school's production of Evita, he asked Jacobs to audition for an upcoming documentary opera based on the story of Harvey Milk. Jacobs auditioned for the film and was cast as "Young Harvey". This allowed him to participate in both a performance marking the anniversary of Milk's assassination and the candlelight ceremony that took place prior to the show.

Jacobs studied at the NYU Tisch School of the Arts and graduated with a BFA in Theater. During this time, he also studied with the Collaborative Arts Project Musical Theater program (CAP21) and the Stonestreet Film and Television Studios program.

== Career ==
Upon graduation from Tisch, Jacobs performed in regional theater and cruise lines. He toured the country as Cinderella's Prince in Into the Woods before landing his first Equity production as Nanki-poo in Marriott Theater's Hot Mikado.

Jacobs got his big break when he landed the role of "Marius" in the national tour of Les Misérables, a part he later played in the Broadway revival. Since then, Jacobs has starred in Mamma Mia! as Sky and The Lion King as Simba, both on Broadway. He also played the role of Daniel Beauxhomme in Paper Mill Playhouse's production of Once on This Island. Jacobs credits his mixed Filipino-Jewish ethnicity which has allowed him to play such varied roles.

In 2011, Jacobs began performing in the original cast in the musical Aladdin as the title role at the 5th Avenue Theatre in Seattle. In 2012, the musical put on several regional and international productions, and was given a Toronto tryout the following year. It opened on Broadway at the New Amsterdam Theatre on March 20, 2014. Jacobs performed his last show in Broadway's Aladdin on February 12, 2017. It was announced that he would continue playing Aladdin in the upcoming North American tour. The North American tour began April 11, 2017.

His debut solo album entitled Right Where I Belong, is a compilation of Alan Menken songs including well known tunes such as “Proud of Your Boy” (Aladdin), “Go The Distance” (Hercules), “Santa Fe” (Newsies), and “Suddenly Seymour” (Little Shop of Horrors in duet with his sister Arielle Jacobs) as well as a few lesser-known melodies from Menken's earlier works.

== Personal life ==
Jacobs met his future wife, Kelly Kohnert, performing in a Christmas show in Hershey, Pennsylvania. While she was performing as a dancer, he starred as the show's Santa Claus. The two were later married, and their twin boys were born on January 27, 2014. The family moved away from Sunnyside and moved to Wilmette, Illinois, in 2018. Jacobs' younger sister, Arielle Jacobs, is also a successful theater actress and starred as Princess Jasmine in Aladdin on Broadway and as Imelda in Here Lies Love on Broadway.

== Filmography ==
=== Film ===
Year(s)	Title	Role	Notes
2004	Lullaby	Duncan Forbes, Charles Noyce	
2013	Bottomless Pit	Sebastian	Short film
2014	Four Kinds of Love	Mr. Wilson	
2014	Random: It's a Small Town Thing	Jax, Mr. Tick Tock, Arial	Also writer and director
2021	Adam Jacobs Behind the Curtain	Himself	
2021	Last Call in the Dog House	Mo	

=== Television ===
Year(s)	Title	Role	Notes
2016	The Blake & Sal Show	Himself/Guest	Episode: "Entertainment Apex: Adam Jacobs Interview"
2018	Chicago Med	Ryan Scott	Episode: "When to Let Go"
2019	Soundtrack	Dominic	Episode: "Track 10: Finale"

=== Theater ===
Year(s)	Title	Role	Notes
2004–2006	Les Misérables	Marius Pontmercy	Third National Tour
2006–2008	Les Misérables	Marius Pontmercy	Broadway Revival
2009–2010	Mamma Mia!	Sky	Second National Tour
2010–2011	The Lion King	Simba	National Tour - Gazelle Company
2011	Aladdin	Aladdin	5th Avenue Theatre
2011–2012	The Lion King	Simba	Broadway
2012	Once on This Island	Daniel	Paper Mill Playhouse
2013-2014	Aladdin	Aladdin	Ed Mirvish Theatre
2014–2017	Aladdin	Aladdin	Broadway
2017–2018	Aladdin	Aladdin	First National Tour
2018	Sweet Charity	Vittorio Vidal	Marriott Theatre
2019	Something Rotten!	The Bard	Marriott Theatre
2022	The King and I	The King of Siam	Drury Lane Theatre
2023	The Who's Tommy	Captain Walker	Goodman Theatre
2024	The Who's Tommy	Captain Walker	Broadway Revival
2026	Monte Cristo	Edmund	Off-Broadway, York Theatre Company
