= Jasmine (Aladdin) =

Fictional character from the 1992 Disney film Aladdin

- Aladdin character
- First appearance: Aladdin (1992)
- Created by: Ron Clements; John Musker; Ted Elliott; Terry Rossio
- Based on: Badroulbadour by Antoine Galland
- Voiced by: Linda Larkin (speaking); Lea Salonga (singing); Liz Callaway (singing voice in The Return of Jafar, Aladdin and the King of Thieves)
- Portrayed by: Courtney Reed (2011 musical); Arielle Jacobs (2016 Australian musical); Naomi Scott (2019 film); Shazia Pascal (Descendants: The Rise of Red); Aiza Azaar (Descendants: The Rise of Red) (young)

In-universe information
- Title: Princess of Agrabah
- Affiliation: Disney Princesses
- Family: The Sultan (father); The Sultana (mother)
- Spouse: Aladdin
- Relatives: Cassim (father-in-law); Sharma (cousin)

Jasmine is a fictional character who appears in Walt Disney Pictures' 31st animated film Aladdin (1992). Voiced by Linda Larkin – with a singing voice provided by Lea Salonga – Jasmine is the spirited daughter of the Sultan, who has grown weary of her life of palace confinement. Despite an age-old law stipulating that the princess must marry a prince in time for her upcoming birthday, Jasmine is instead determined to marry someone she loves for who he is as opposed to what he owns. Created by screenwriters and directors Ron Clements and John Musker with co-screenwriters Ted Elliott and Terry Rossio, Jasmine is based on Badroulbadour, a princess who appears in the One Thousand and One Nights folktale "Aladdin and the Magical Lamp."

Originally conceived as a spoiled and materialistic princess, the writers eventually rewrote Jasmine into a stronger and more prominent heroine following the elimination of Aladdin's mother from the script, while borrowing story elements from the romantic comedy Roman Holiday (1953). Several months after securing the role, Larkin was nearly fired from the project because Disney executive Jeffrey Katzenberg felt that her voice was not suitable for a princess, but Clements and Musker managed to convince him otherwise. Discovered by casting director Albert Tavares, Lea Salonga was cast as Jasmine's singing voice based on her performance in the musical Miss Saigon; this unprecedented casting decision made Jasmine the first Disney Princess to have her speaking and singing voices provided by two different actresses. Animated by Mark Henn, Jasmine's design is an eclectic combination of unique sources, including an anonymous theme park guest, Henn's own sister, and actress Jennifer Connelly.

The character has garnered mixed reviews, with much of her character arc compared unfavorably to her predecessors Ariel from The Little Mermaid (1989) and Belle from Beauty and the Beast (1991), but has been praised for her personality and her chemistry with Aladdin. She is the sixth Disney Princess and the franchise's first non-European member, as well as its first West Asian princess. Due to this, the character is credited with introducing racial diversity to Disney's princess genre. Unlike most of Disney's princesses, Jasmine is a supporting character in her own film, taking the secondary role of the love interest. Jasmine has made subsequent appearances in Aladdin's sequels The Return of Jafar (1994) and Aladdin and the King of Thieves (1996), as well as its television series and a Broadway musical adaption of the film. Both Larkin and Salonga have been awarded Disney Legends for their contributions to the role.

== Development ==
=== Conception and writing ===
Jasmine is based on the princess who appears in the Middle Eastern folk tale collection One Thousand and One Nights, specifically the story "Aladdin and the Magical Lamp." Lyricist Howard Ashman and composer Alan Menken had first begun to develop Aladdin while they were still writing songs for The Little Mermaid (1989), but further development was abandoned in favor of working on Beauty and the Beast (1991) instead. However, Aladdin was finally resurrected as Beauty and the Beast neared completion. While the princess in the original tale is named Badroulbadour, the studio decided to rename the character the more familiar "Jasmine" after actress Jasmine Guy. Additionally, the name was also among the decade's most popular at the time. In Ashman's original treatment of the film, Aladdin had two potential love interests: both Jasmine and a "Judy Garland-y tomboy," whose romantic feelings for Aladdin were not reciprocated by the hero. Screenwriter Linda Woolverton eventually drafted a screenplay based on the film The Thief of Baghdad (1940), a revision that included a handmaiden for Jasmine (an idea resurfaced in the 2019 live-action film), who was ultimately replaced by a pet tiger.

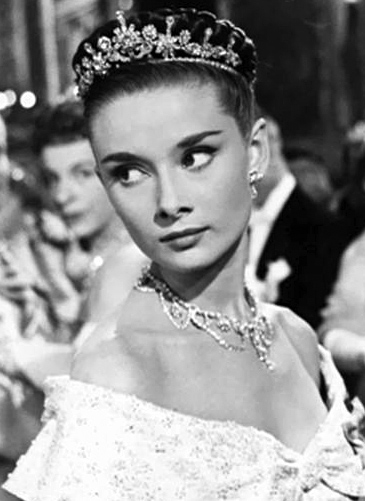
Actress Audrey Hepburn's role as Princess Ann, a bored princess, in the film Roman Holiday (1953) provided inspiration for Jasmine's story line.

Directors and writers Ron Clements and John Musker eventually disregarded Woolverton's script in favor of developing something more similar to Ashman's version, albeit making several changes to his treatment, among them approaching the character of Jasmine "a little differently," while maintaining Woolverton's vision of "a princess that Aladdin could woo." Following the elimination of Aladdin's mother from the script, Jasmine and Aladdin's relationship was expanded upon to the point of which it became a focal point of the film, ultimately allowing more screen time for the princess. Thus, Jasmine was developed into a more prominent character. Unlike Disney's previous adaptations of fairy tales, the princess is not the film's main character, and therefore the story does not revolve around her. Despite the presence of a prominent princess character, the directors decided to treat Aladdin more-so like "an Arabian adventure" as opposed to a traditional Disney fairy tale or princess film in the vein of Snow White and the Seven Dwarfs (1937) or Beauty and the Beast. The decision to make Aladdin a high comedy ultimately eliminated the need to explore some of Jasmine's deeper storylines.

Although several details of the original folk tale were altered for the film adaptation, Jasmine's main storyline – being pressured into marriage – remained mostly untouched. However, while Badroulbadour initially resents Aladdin, Jasmine on the other hand is almost immediately charmed by him. Screenwriters Ted Elliott and Terry Rossio rewrote Jasmine into a "stronger" character who actively longs for freedom from her "regal confinement." According to Dave Smith of the Disney Archives, the "liberated" Jasmine primarily "seeks to escape her present lifestyle." The idea of a disguised Jasmine stowing away from her palace in the middle of the night was inspired by the romantic comedy film Roman Holiday (1953), in which Princess Ann, portrayed by actress Audrey Hepburn, similarly escapes the royal embassy in disguise in order to spend one day exploring Rome on her own.

=== Voice ===
The casting of American actor and comedian Robin Williams as the Genie inspired the studio to recruit similarly talented voice actors capable of matching his pace. The filmmakers had originally envisioned Jasmine's voice as similar to that of actress Lauren Bacall. Jasmine's speaking voice is provided by American actress Linda Larkin. The role was only one of several auditions Larkin had scheduled during the same week in which she auditioned for Aladdin, and she originally underestimated the scope of the project, joking, "I thought it was going to be something like DuckTales (sic)." Initially presented with only a few pages of the screenplay, Larkin found that she was particularly drawn to Jasmine's "spirit of activism," in addition to the ways in which character was both similar to and different from previous Disney heroines. Princesses Snow White, Cinderella, and Aurora had been childhood favorites of the actress. Larkin's first audition was held in a Burbank, California recording studio, in which she performed solely for the film's casting director. The side used for Larkin's first audition was the scene in which Jasmine meets Aladdin in the marketplace – their first encounter. Jasmine's line 'It's all so magical' helped convince Larkin that she was "meant" to voice the character. Although Larkin's voice was significantly different from what the filmmakers had originally envisioned for the character, her interpretation gradually changed their minds.

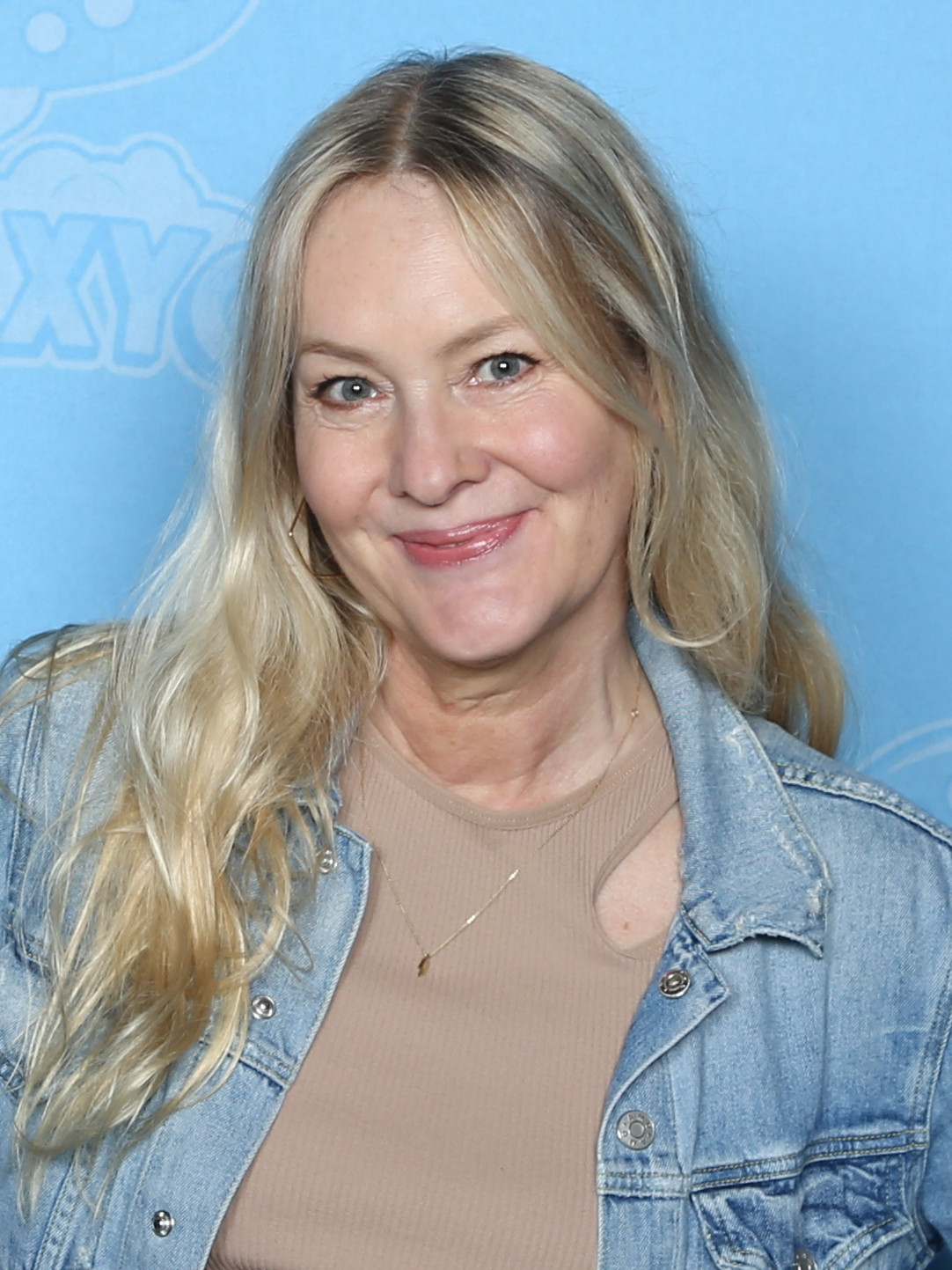
Actress Linda Larkin provides Jasmine's speaking voice; six months after being cast, Disney executive Jeffrey Katzenberg insisted that she was required to re-audition for the role.

In the form of an extensive series of callbacks, Larkin returned to the studio on several different occasions over the next few months. While the audience of studio executives and filmmakers continued to increase, the amount of actresses competing for the role gradually decreased accordingly as the audition process neared completion. Larkin's final audition lasted a total of four hours, during which she read through the entire script for the first time. The animators were also provided with an opportunity to animate to Larkin's voice for the first time. The actress was finally cast several months later, by which time she had nearly forgotten she had ever auditioned. Six months into recording, however, Larkin was forced to re-audition for the role by Disney executive Jeffrey Katzenberg, who felt that the actress' voice lacked the authority required to voice a princess. However, Clements and Musker disagreed with him, and managed to trick Katzenberg into not firing Larkin by staging a fake recording session during which they had the actress speak lower and slower in Katzenberg's presence, only to have her return to her natural voice thereafter. Larkin recorded only one scene alongside her co-stars Williams and Scott Weinger, the voice of Aladdin. Apart from some rough, unfinished storyboards and drawings, Larkin did not see much of her character until the film was finally screened at the Museum of Modern Art.

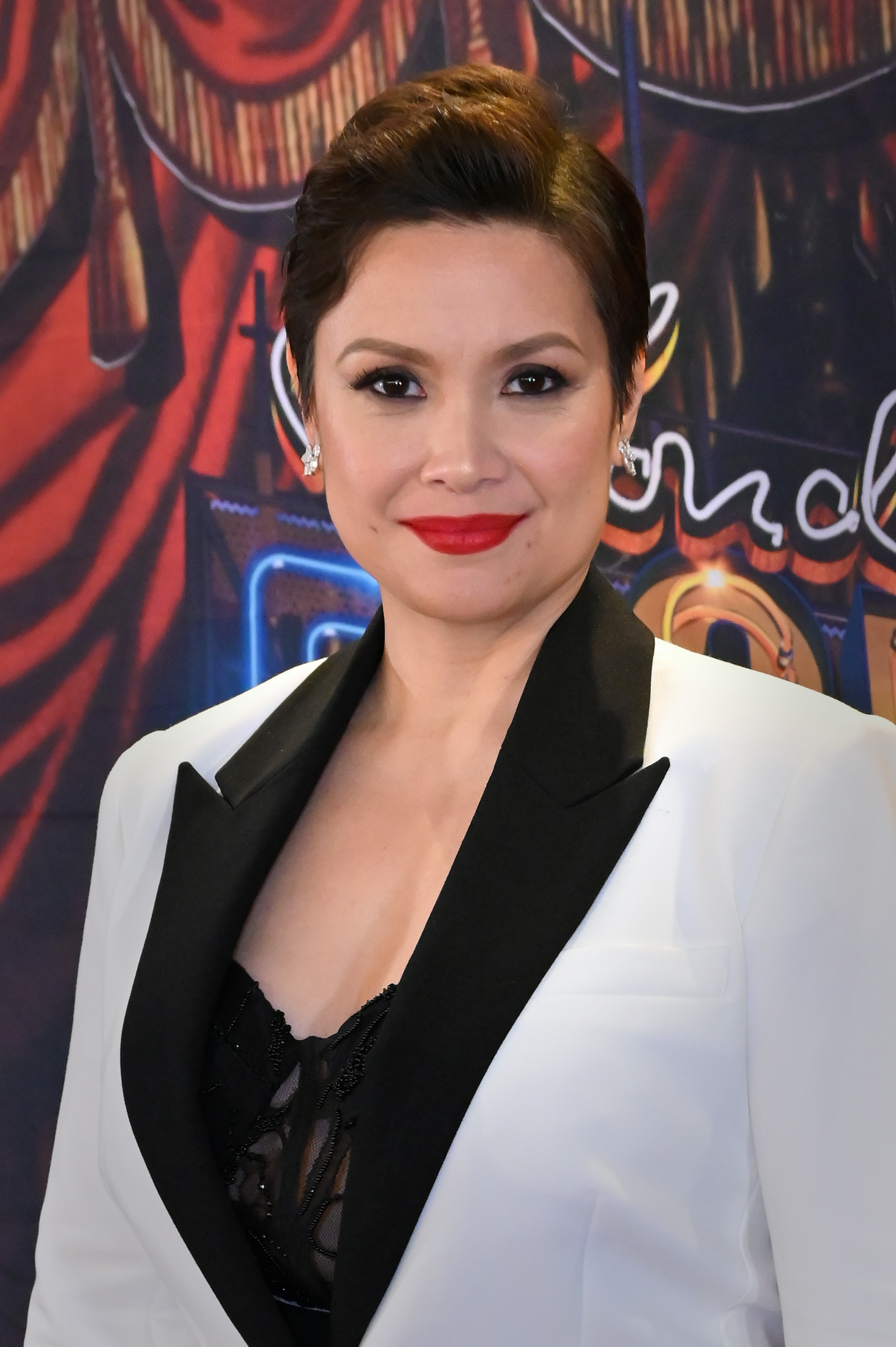
Actress and singer Lea Salonga provides Jasmine's singing voice.

Before discovering Larkin, Disney had been insisting on auditioning exclusively performers who were capable of singing as well as they could act. However, after Williams' recruitment, the studio relented in favor of casting "strong actors" instead. When Larkin first auditioned for the role, "A Whole New World," Jasmine's only surviving song, had not yet been written; she admitted, "there's no way I would have even auditioned ... if there had been a song from the beginning." After writing Jasmine's first song, the filmmakers asked Larkin if she would be interested in recording it and providing the character's singing voice. Larkin immediately declined, joking, "I do [sing] ... but not like a princess!" Thus, Disney decided to recruit a singer who could mimic Larkin's speaking voice instead, despite the actress' fear that the studio would completely replace her with a professional singer altogether.

Jasmine's singing voice is provided by Filipina singer and actress Lea Salonga. Salonga's Tony Award-winning performance in the musical Miss Saigon helped her garner the interest of casting director Albert Tavares, who proceeded to leave a note for the singer on the stage door before leaving a show he had attended. Salonga's agent then scheduled her audition, at which she performed "Part of Your World" from The Little Mermaid. Salonga finally began recording a demo of "A Whole New World" a few days later. With the casting of Salonga, Larkin became one of Disney's first voice actors to not provide the singing voice of the character she voices, and thus Jasmine marked the first time Disney decided to separate a Princess's speaking and singing voices. Describing Salonga as "an incredible singer," Larkin herself was pleasantly surprised by how much Salonga's voice resembled her own when she first heard "A Whole New World," joking, "the filmmakers almost had me convinced that I sang it."

=== Personality and design ===
The character's blurb on the official Disney website reads, "Jasmine is an independent, fiery beauty capable of taking care of herself" who "longs to experience life outside the palace." The writers had originally conceived Jasmine as a spoiled and materialistic princess whose interests were limited to clothing and jewelry, but eventually developed her into a stronger, more mature character. Larkin described Jasmine as "a very strong, well defined character from the very beginning." Mark Henn served as Jasmine's supervising animator. Having originally been hired to animate Aladdin's mother, the removal of the character from the film ultimately provided Henn with the opportunity to animate Jasmine instead. Throughout Disney's previous animated film Beauty and the Beast, the design of the heroine Belle – whom Henn had also helped animate – suffered from various inconsistencies due to the character having been animated at two completely separate studio locations. To avoid experiencing a similar dilemma with Jasmine, the filmmakers ultimately decided to have the princess animated entirely at one studio. Because Jasmine is the film's love interest as opposed to its main character, the princess was animated at the company's secondary studio in Florida, while Aladdin was animated in California. However, the more intimate love scenes between the two leads forced Henn to frequently communicate with Aladdin's lead animator Glen Keane through phone and fax, and the animators also sent designs and discs to each other. Out of his desire to introduce Indian architecture into the film, art director Bill Perkins based Jasmine's design on the famous mausoleum, the Taj Mahal, which itself incorporates and expands on Indian design, particularly the curves demonstrated in the character's hair, clothes and jewelry.

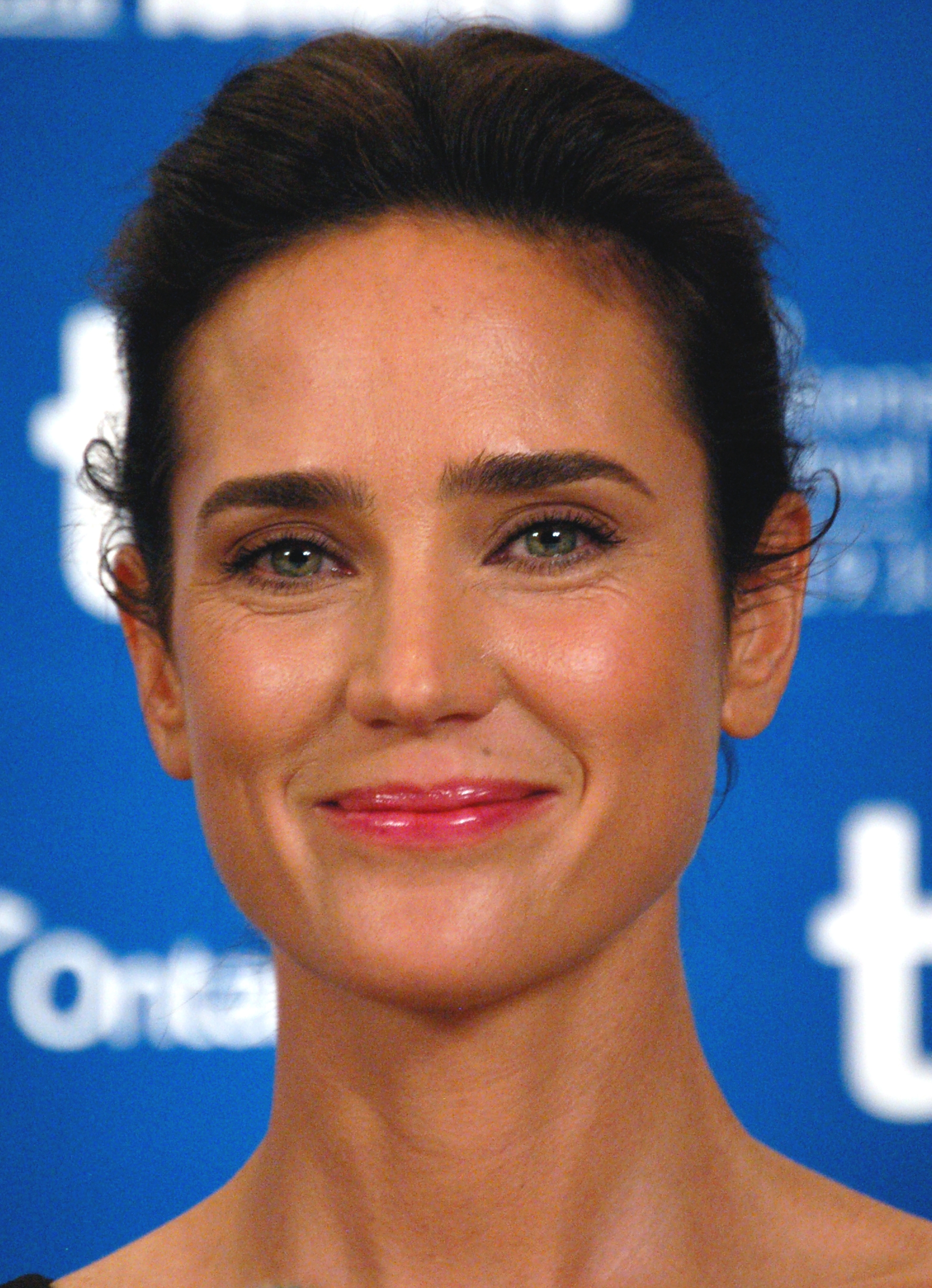
Actress Jennifer Connelly inspired Jasmine's appearance.

Having just recently animated two previous Disney heroines – Ariel from The Little Mermaid and Belle from Beauty and the Beast, respectively – Henn initially suffered from a severe case of "artist's block" while attempting to design his third heroine, Jasmine. While working on the character at Disney-MGM Studios in Florida, Henn noticed a young female amusement park guest with long black hair, and ultimately decided to use her as his initial inspiration for Jasmine; the guest's identity remains anonymous to date. Earliest sketches of Jasmine were based on various exotic-looking supermodels in addition to her namesake Jasmine Guy, but the actress' facial features were ultimately considered to be too "severe" for an animated character. In search of "something fresh to help with the physical look of her," Henn was eventually inspired by a high school graduation photograph of his younger sister Beth Allen, who wore her hair in a style similar to what would ultimately become Jasmine's. Henn credits his sister with helping him overcome his artist's block, and the directors ultimately approved of Henn's concept design. The character's facial features were further inspired by actress Jennifer Connelly, specifically her eyebrows. Additionally, some of Larkin's own mannerisms and physical traits were incorporated into the character. Henn credits one particular dinner conversation he had shared with Larkin with proving very inspirational in terms of helping him discover Jasmine's emotional side. Model Robina Ritchie served as an on-location reference for the animation, pantomiming actions to the recording of Larkin's voiceovers so, in Henn's words, "the animator gets the feeling of what the real human movement would be."

The final appearance of Jasmine consequently inspired the studio to redesign Aladdin; accordingly, Katzenberg felt that the main character, who was originally depicted as a younger, "scrawny" underdog, did not resemble a suitable leading man for Jasmine, which they feared would result in unconvincing chemistry between the couple. Thus, they ultimately decided to base Aladdin on actor Tom Cruise instead. Henn's favorite sequence to animate was the scene in which Jasmine discovers Aladdin's true identity and gives him "a look." The filmmakers decided to dress Jasmine in blue to symbolically represent water, which is "the most precious substance one can find in a desert." The animators sat the character next to a fountain when she is first introduced in the film to further emphasize this motif and comparison. With her appearance finalized, Jasmine became Disney's first non-white princess as opposed to being of European heritage.

== Themes ==
=== Characteristics and beliefs ===
As a character, Jasmine is both similar to and different from Disney heroines who preceded her. She possesses many qualities associated with traditional Disney Princesses, grace and beauty among them. However, marketed by Disney as "a heroine of the 1990s," Jasmine is "born-before-her-time," and thus her intelligence and ambitions tend to more-so resemble contemporary incarnations, like Belle. Brian Lowry of Variety likened Jasmine's strong-willed personality to that of Belle, describing her as an "anachronistically liberated" heroine. Meanwhile, The Hollywood News' Rob Burch observed that the princess is very similar to Ariel, being "independent, beautiful, and desperate for the chance to live her own life," while at the same time concealing kindness beneath "a shield of anger." Belonging to "a series of spunky heroines" inspired by both contemporary feminism and the girl power movement, Jasmine was recognized by Hearing a Film, Seeing a Sermon: Preaching and Popular Movies author Timothy B. Cargal as a member of Disney's "continued efforts to reshape their heroines for a more feminist age," in addition to providing young girls with strong female role models with whom they can identify. Jasmine is already more resourceful than her two immediate predecessors, while sharing their same preference for assertiveness and empowerment over passiveness, traits echoed by several other Disney Princesses introduced throughout the decade. At the same time, Jasmine is depicted as being feistier than Belle and less naïve than Ariel.

Distinctively, Jasmine is not Aladdin's protagonist, a role held instead by title character Aladdin, while Jasmine herself occupies a secondary role as the film's love interest, consequently lacking significant character development. However, sometimes both characters are collectively referred to as protagonists, while Jasmine is sometimes identified as the film's "female protagonist." The First Novels Club observed that Jasmine essentially "ends up the same person as when she started." Little is known about Jasmine's interests, hobbies, and goals. The Art of the Princess and the Frog author Jeff Kurrti wrote that although "Jasmine is less prominent as a heroine ... she made decisions and was a little more strong-willed." Samantha Rullo of Bustle agreed that, despite her secondary role, Jasmine remains "determined to live her life the way she wants to, rather than letting others make her decisions for her," and thus ranks among Disney's most rebellious princesses. Jasmine's personality continues to rank among Disney's "strongest" heroines because she is not concerned about wealth or social class, despite her opulent upbringing. Similarly, Jasmine is not interested in marrying someone who is capable of only offering her everything she already owns, opting for excitement and companionship instead.

Alongside Aladdin's other main characters, Jasmine embodies the film's central theme of longing for freedom from some form of confinement or oppression. Both the film and its characters are influenced by Jasmine's "power of choice." The character's desire for both freedom and a sense of agency is constantly threatened by other characters and situations; the sole decision Jasmine maintains complete agency over during the entire film is who she falls in love with – aided by the Genie's refusal to use his magical powers to force characters to fall in love – although not who she marries. Although Jasmine yearns to explore her kingdom beyond the confines of her palace, she only gets as far as the marketplace before returning home. Jasmine explores "the idea that enclosing yourself behind walls can make you more vulnerable, not less," as evidenced by the fact that the character is unprepared and knows little about money when she ventures into the marketplace for first time. In the film, Jasmine releases a flock of birds from their cage, which serves as a metaphor for her own situation, being "caged from a world she has never seen and yearns to be released." Jasmine's bedroom is also shaped like a bird cage to represent her own confinement. Her story also explores themes such as civil rights, racial tolerance, social hierarchy, and life, liberty and the pursuit of happiness.

=== Feminism, marriage laws, and gender ===
Jasmine demonstrates several traits, beliefs and ideologies associated with feminism, exercising much "feminist potential," although notably less explicit than Belle's. Nonetheless, the character still adheres to traditional romance-oriented aspirations commonly associated with Disney's princess characters despite "her modern, feminist attitude," although her yearning for romance is much more subdued in comparison. Steve Daly of Entertainment Weekly identified Jasmine as "a sexually aware, proto-feminist princess." "New" Exoticisms: Changing Patterns in the Construction of Otherness author Isabel Santaolalla wrote that Jasmine appears to have inherited "the legacy bequeathed by the 1960s Women's Movement." Having "stepped out of the 1990s" according to The Washington Post's Desson Howe, Jasmine is appropriately opposed to the glass ceiling." Defying marriage laws and arranged marriages are also among Jasmine's central themes. Larkin believes that her character is responsible for inspiring a change in her kingdom's marriage laws, explaining, "Jasmine didn't just believe in something, she fought against something that she saw was an injustice ... She actively sought change and made it happen." Musker agreed that the princess "rebel[s] against the social structure in choosing to marry someone of her own free will." According to singer Brad Kane, who provides Aladdin's singing voice, "Aladdin is a stealth feminist movie" because Jasmine is "willing to give up being a princess to not get stuck marrying someone." Jasmine's defiance eventually successfully convinces her father to change the constitution.

The only named, speaking female character in the male-dominated film, Jasmine lacks both female companions and a motherly figure (the male characters account for 90% of the film's dialogue). The character has come to resent the patriarchal society in which she lives. Movies and the Mind: Theories of the Great Psychoanalysts Applied to Film author William Indick observed that Jasmine represents "the rejection of the father-king's domination and control over his daughter's life," resembling "a strong and assertive heroine who rebels against her father's tyranny rather than passively accepting his will." Jasmine's life is almost entirely determined by men, by whom she refuses to be ordered, constantly voicing her disapproval by rejecting arrogant suitors and yelling at men who attempt to make decisions on her behalf, while challenging traditional gender roles and male authority figures. Jasmine's father, the Sultan, responds to his daughter's constant rejection of potential suitors with "I don't know where she gets it from. Her mother wasn't nearly so picky," indicating that Jasmine's mother "belonged to a generation of docile pre-feminist ... women." At times, Jasmine can seem judgmental; she originally has a thoroughly negative opinion of all princes until she meets a disguised Aladdin. In Ulrich Marzolph's book The Arabian Nights Reader, the author described the character as "the mouthpiece of opposition to a vaguely defined Middle Eastern backwardness and authoritarianism."

== Appearances ==
=== Films and television series ===
Jasmine debuted in Aladdin (1992) as the Princess of Agrabah, daughter of the Sultan. Frustrated with constantly having decisions made for her and being pressured into marrying a prince by law, Jasmine disguises herself as a peasant and escapes the palace. In the nearby marketplace, Jasmine befriends street thief Aladdin after he rescues her from an angry vendor who very nearly chops her hand off. Escaping to Aladdin's hideout, the pair bonds over the realization that they both feel trapped in their own environments and long for better lives. When Aladdin is soon arrested by the palace guards, Jasmine demands his immediate release only to find her orders overruled by Jafar, the Sultan's scheming grand vizier. When the princess confronts Jafar, he lies and tells her that Aladdin has already been executed, leaving Jasmine distraught and blaming herself for his death; in reality, Jafar is using Aladdin to retrieve a magical lamp containing a genie. When the Genie, who saves and befriends Aladdin, grants his wish to be transformed into a prince to better his chances of wooing Jasmine, Aladdin introduces himself to her as "Prince Ali." Although initially unimpressed, Jasmine is charmed after joining him on a magic carpet ride, at the end of which she discovers that the prince is, in fact, the same peasant she met in the marketplace. However, Aladdin convinces Jasmine that he truly is a prince who, much like her, only occasionally disguises himself as a commoner. When Jafar learns the truth about Aladdin, he steals the lamp and becomes the Genie's master, banishing Aladdin and forcing the Genie to make him Sultan, while enslaving both Jasmine and her father. After refusing to marry him, Jasmine kisses Jafar to distract him while Aladdin returns in time to trick Jafar into wishing himself into a genie and thus trapping himself within the lamp. Jasmine and the Sultan are finally freed, and she and Aladdin become engaged after the Sultan abolishes the law so that Jasmine can legally marry whomever she chooses.

Following the success of Aladdin, Jasmine appears in the film's two direct-to-video sequels, both of which Larkin reprises her role as the character, with Liz Callaway replacing Salonga as her singing voice. The first, The Return of Jafar (1994), features Jasmine as she begins to question her trust in Aladdin after he defends Jafar's former pet parrot, Iago, who escapes Jafar's lamp and rescues Aladdin from bandits, hoping to make amends with the royal family. However, Iago manages to convince the princess that she still very much trusts Aladdin. Jasmine eventually befriends Iago after he helps mend her and Aladdin's relationship, frees the Genie, and ultimately risks his life to destroy Jafar (who has returned seeking vengeance) once and for all. In the second, Aladdin and the King of Thieves (1996), Jasmine's long-awaited wedding to Aladdin is interrupted by the Forty Thieves. The Oracle, which the thieves are attempting to steal, reveals that Aladdin's father Cassim is still alive and is their leader. Encouraging Aladdin to pursue his father, Jasmine agrees to postpone the wedding, but can't help but worry for him during his absence. When Aladdin finally returns to Agrabah with Cassim and introduces him, Jasmine and the Sultan take an immediate liking to him. However, Cassim is soon imprisoned by the Sultan after he attempts to steal the Oracle again. Aladdin frees Cassim and accepts punishment for his actions until Jasmine convinces her father that he was only helping his father out of love. Iago returns to inform them that Cassim has been captured by Sa'luk and the remaining Thieves. Jasmine goes with Aladdin to rescue his father, and afterward, they return for their wedding, which Cassim attends from the shadows. They go for a ride on Carpet, waving goodbye to the Merchant from the first film and Iago and Cassim as they ride off.

Jasmine appears in the television series based on the film, which originally aired from 1994 to 1995. In the series, Jasmine accompanies her friends in their adventures, proving herself to be a valuable member of the team. She is shown to have excellent fighting skills and has made the most daring sacrifices, as shown in episodes such as "The Secret of Dagger Rock", where she rescues Aladdin from evil sorcerer Mozenrath, and "The Ethereal", where she sacrifices herself to save a young boy, which causes the titular ethereal to call off her attack on Agrabah and revive the princess. The series also highlights Jasmine's romantic relationship with Aladdin. The two are currently engage,d and they continue to let their relationship grow to the point where they are ready for marriage, while also not without their occasional issues as a couple. Their loving relationship is proven to be incredibly strong that they are willing to do whatever it takes to protect and stay with each other. This is best shown in the episode "Eye of the Beholder", where Mirage transforms Jasmine into a humanoid snake to test her relationship with Aladdin, convincing the princess that Aladdin only loves her for her beauty. Her attempt to destroy their love backfires, however, as Aladdin decides to transform himself into a snake so that he can be with Jasmine forever, proving that he truly loves Jasmine for who she is. Jasmine also faces off romantic rivals who try to steal Aladdin away from her, such as Sadira (a former street rat turned sand witch who later becomes friends with the group) and Saleen (an evil mermaid who serves as a sea sorceress).

Jasmine, alongside the other Disney Princesses, appears in the film Ralph Breaks the Internet, as was announced at the 2017 D23 Expo.

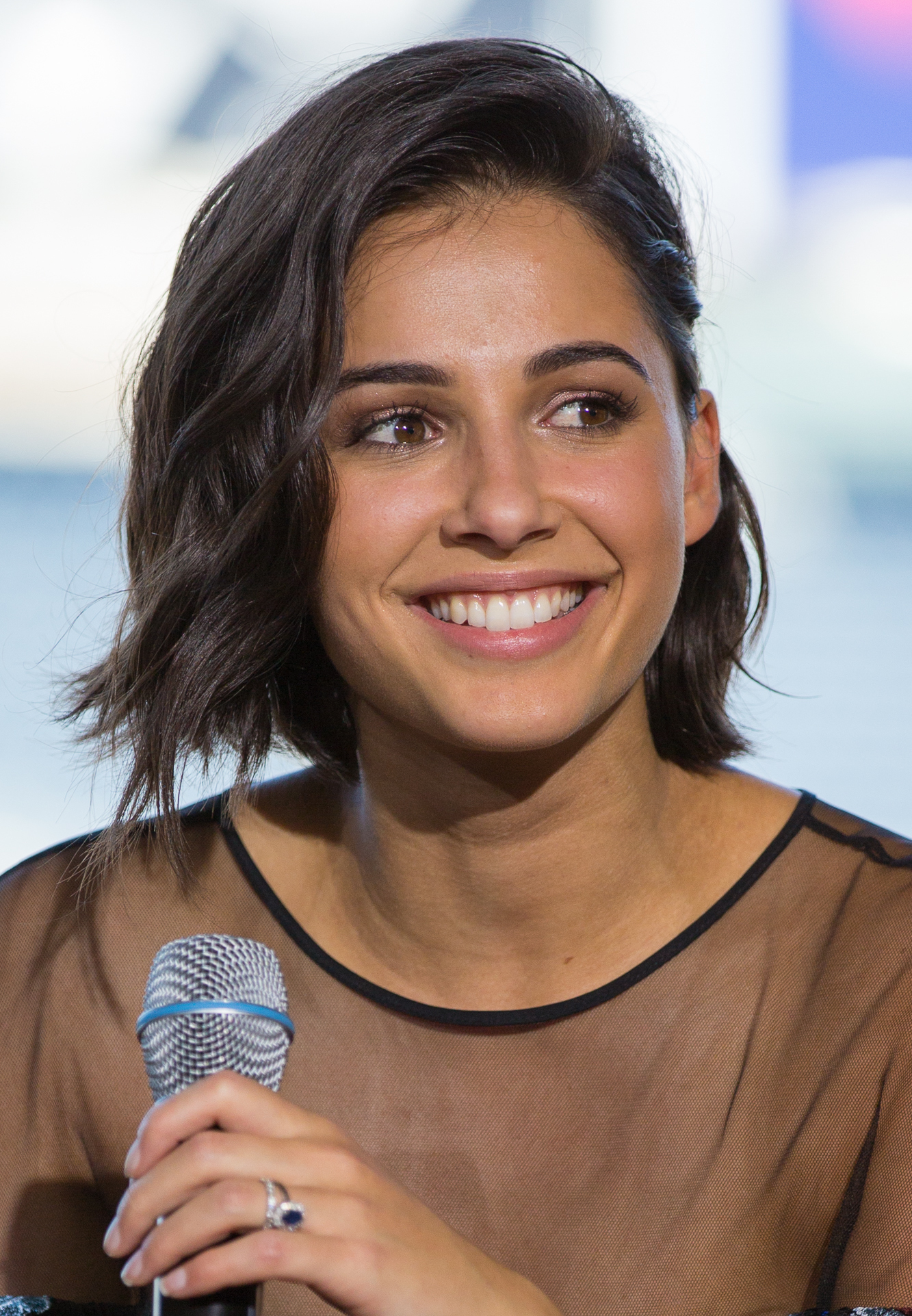
Naomi Scott

Naomi Scott portrays Jasmine in a live-action adaptation of the 1992 film. The film's storyline depicts her mother to originate from Agrabah's neighboring kingdom of Sherebad, desiring to improve her people's lives as sultana despite traditions and Jafar manipulating the Sultan for his own ends. At the end of the film, Jasmine becomes Agrabah's first sultana with the power to legally marry whomever she chooses. Scott's performance as Jasmine in the film was generally well-received by critics with some considering her version an improvement over the original with the character's new song, "Speechless" also receiving praise. (Note: Attributed to multiple references:)

Avneet Kaur portrayed Princess Jasmine in Aladdin - Naam Toh Suna Hoga, an Indian fantasy TV series and a loose adaptation of the 1992 film, which aired from 21 August 2018 to 5 February 2021. In it, her name is changed to Yasmine, the Shehzadi (crown princess) of Baghdad. Having a strict mother, but have been taught good leadership by her father - the Sultan, she roams the country's streets disguised as a commoner. Soon, she meets Aladdin (a generous thief) who has a Genie named Ginu and befriends him. Later, they fall in love only to witness a tragic end due to Zafar's evil plot. In the second season, they reunite to defeat him and kill the evil queen Mallika, only to get their lives sacrificed as they realise that Zafar is alive. In the third season, they are reborn, defeat Zafar with Ginu's help and finally marry. Following the COVID-19 pandemic, Ashi Singh replaced Kaur as Jasmine in August 2020.

=== Broadway musical ===
Courtney Reed as Jasmine in the stage musical

Jasmine appears in the Broadway musical adaptation of Aladdin, which premiered at the New Amsterdam Theatre in March 2014. The role was originated by actress Courtney Reed, becoming her first time originating a Broadway character after appearing in minor roles in Broadway productions such as In the Heights and Mamma Mia! Reed had grown up a longtime fan of Disney films and princesses, and, being of mixed ethnicity, cites Jasmine as her favorite princess because "she was my first experience seeing a Disney princess who looked like me ... So I thought, 'Wow, I can be like her'," while the others tend to have blond hair and blue eyes. Equally a fan of the film itself, the actress' childhood home included an Aladdin-themed room used to store toys; Reed also portrayed Aladdin's pet monkey Abu in a Children's Theatre of Elgin production of the film, although she had really wanted to be cast as Jasmine. Despite having already been associated with the project since its early beginnings and initial readings in 2010, Reed auditioned for the role for director Casey Nicholaw in Seattle before the production finally relocated to Broadway, selected out of only a few actresses who were invited to audition. Unlike co-stars Adam Jacobs and Jonathan Freeman, who portray Aladdin and Jafar, respectively, Reed was the only main cast member required to audition.

After learning she had been cast, Reed hired a personal trainer and practiced a healthier diet to prepare herself for her revealing costumes in which she exposes her midriff as the character. In the musical, Jasmine resembles an even stronger, more spirited character than the film version, specifically the way in which she fights against marriage laws and men who wish to control her. Reed believes her character changed the most during workshops as the show traveled from Seattle to Toronto, and finally Broadway, including the replacement of an original musical number with "These Palace Walls," which composer Alan Menken wrote specifically for Reed. Described by Reed as "a really beautiful song" that "sets up her character," "These Palace Walls" narrates Jasmine's desire to explore the world beyond the confines of the palace, despite being grateful for everything her father has already provided her with. Reed originally found performing "A Whole New World" particularly daunting because, as the film's most famous song, "everyone has these very specific ideas of what they think it should look like or sound like," in addition to feeling pressured to match Salonga's performance, of whom she is a fan.

=== Miscellaneous ===
According to the website Behind the Voice Actors, there are currently over 19 animated iterations of Princess Jasmine from various film, television and video game appearances, with Larkin having voiced 16 of them. As a member of the Disney Princess franchise, Jasmine's likeness is used in a wide variety of merchandise, including magazines, books, toys, video games, clothes, stationery and school supplies. In 2013, Jasmine's design within Disney Princess marketing was updated, garnering mild controversy because some critics accused the character's skin color of being lightened. The character appears in the film Disney Princess Enchanted Tales: Follow Your Dreams, starring in the segment "More Than a Peacock Princess." Having grown weary of her usual princess duties, Jasmine demands more responsibility from the Sultan, who assigns her the position of Royal Assistant Educator at the Royal Academy, a job she actually finds quite difficult due to its rowdy pupils, until she learns to exercise patience and perseverance. The character is also challenged with retrieving the Sultan's horse Sahara, after he goes missing from the stables in order to save the stable boy's job. In print, Jasmine appears in the manga Kilala Princess among several other Disney Princesses, although they never interact with each other.

In addition to starring in her own television series based on Aladdin, Jasmine has made cameo appearances in the Disney Channel animated series Hercules: The Animated Series and House of Mouse. In the film Mickey's Magical Christmas: Snowed in at the House of Mouse (2001), she was voiced by actress Bobbi Page. In June 2013, Jasmine appeared in the Disney Junior animated series Sofia the First, with both Larkin and Salonga reprising the respective roles. This occasion marked the character's first television appearance since House of Mouse more than 10 years prior.

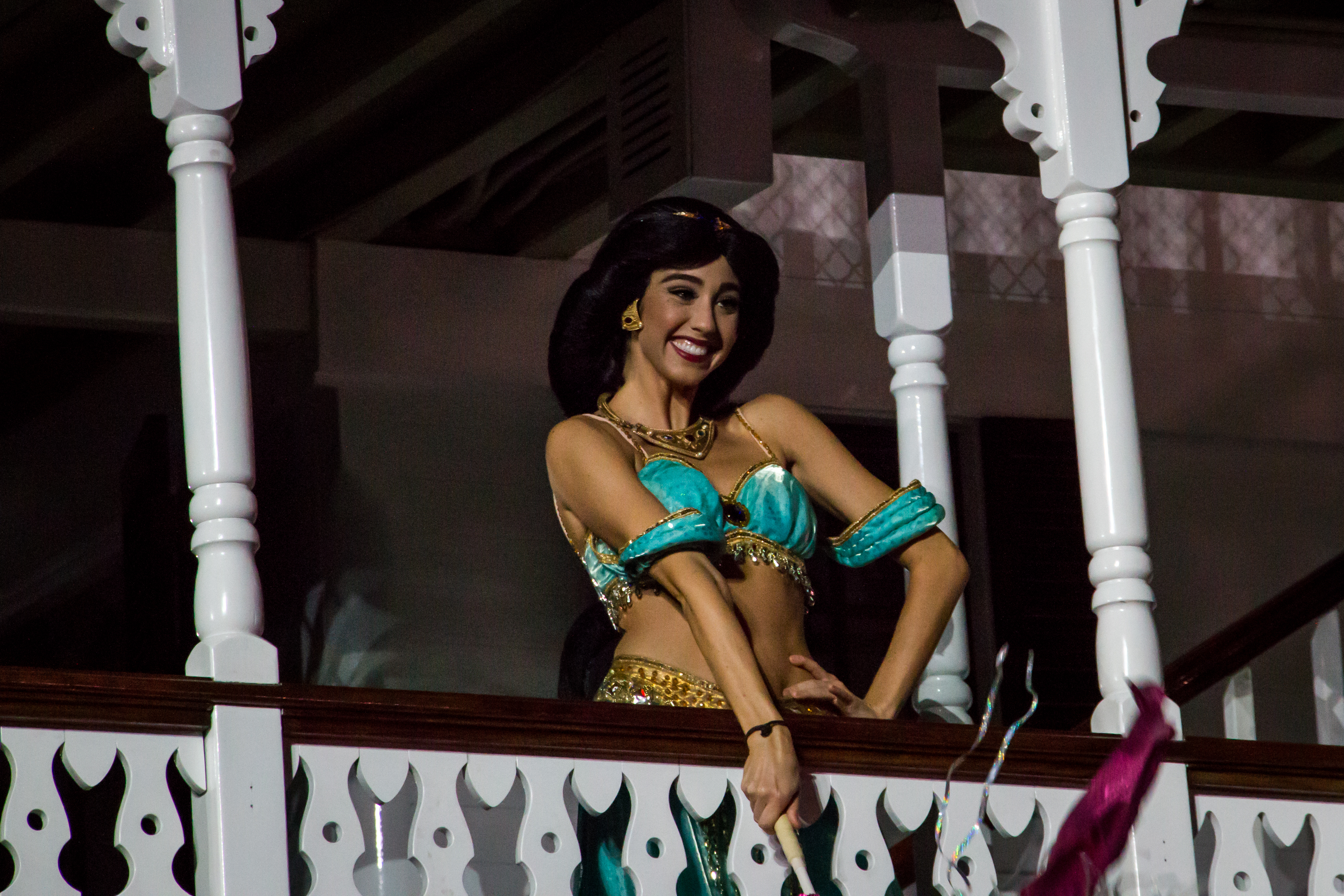
Jasmine as she appears during the finale of Fantasmic! at Disneyland

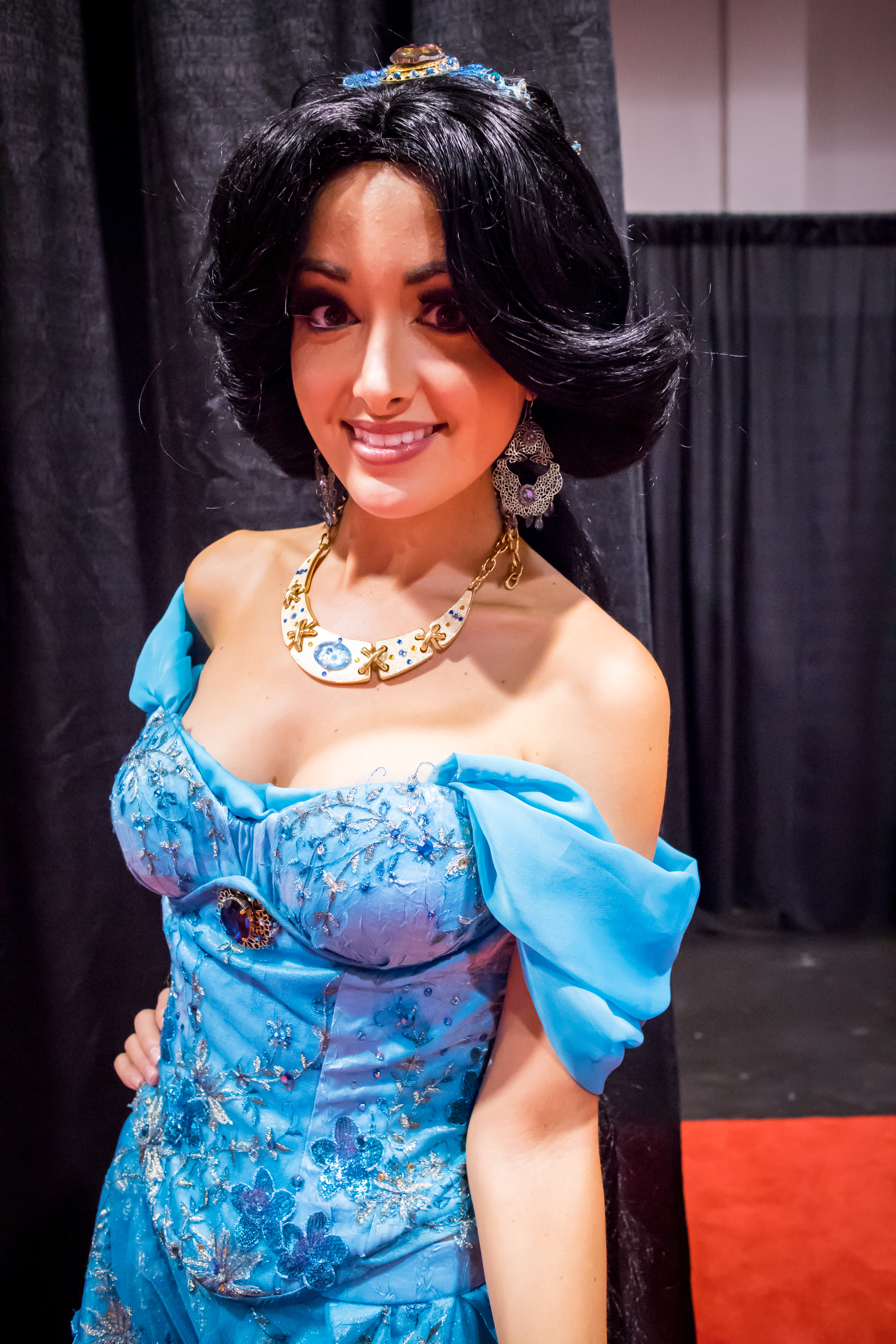
Cosplay of Jasmine, D23 Expo, August 2015

Jasmine appears in several video game adaptations of the Aladdin film series, specifically Disney's Aladdin in Nasira's Revenge (2001), in which Jafar's twin sister Nasira plots to avenge her brother's death by capturing Jasmine and the Sultan. Jasmine becomes a playable character at certain points throughout the game, navigating levels stealthily by hiding in a large vase. Jasmine also appears as a non-playable character in the Kingdom Hearts video game series as one of the seven Princesses of Heart. Jasmine has appeared in the installments Kingdom Hearts (2002), Kingdom Hearts II (2005), and Kingdom Hearts 358/2 Days (2009). Jasmine's kingdom is one of four featured in Disney Princess: Enchanted Journey (2007), which players taking on the role of their own customizable princess can explore via portals to solve various minigames and puzzles, equipped with a magic wand. Common Sense Media identified Jasmine's kingdom as among the game's more challenging environments. Jasmine appears in Kinect: Disneyland Adventures (2011), located in Adventureland. In 2015, Disney Interactive released figurines of both Jasmine and Aladdin for Disney Infinity 2.0 (2014). Jasmine became the fifth Disney Princess to be officially added to the game, as well as the first to be made available as a figurine. In Disney Infinity 2.0, Jasmine is equipped with a magic carpet in addition to the ability to summon wind and cyclones, inflicting various consequences upon enemies and targets. Jasmine is a playable character to unlock for a limited time in the video game Disney Magic Kingdoms and appears as a villager in Disney Dreamlight Valley.

In print, an illustrated version of Jasmine appears in the book Tales from Agrabah: Seven Original Stories of Aladdin and Jasmine (1995), a collection of stories written by author Katherine Applegate that details the lives of the two main characters prior to the events of the film, including how Jasmine came to meet her pet tiger Rajah.

In September 2016, Jasmine appeared as a recurring character in the sixth season of Once Upon a Time, portrayed by Karen David. The character makes a brief first appearance in the season's fourth episode, "Strange Case," before finally starring in the fifth, "Street Rats," in which Jasmine enlists the help of Aladdin to locate a powerful item capable of interrupting Jafar's control over the Sultan. As has become custom with Once Upon a Time's plots, creative liberties were taken with the original film, including Jasmine taking Aladdin to the Cave of Wonders instead of Jafar and the absence of the pair developing romantic feelings for each other, although the iconic scene in which Jasmine is imprisoned in an hourglass is retained. Jasmine's blue outfit was slightly modified for the series. David had previously expressed interest in playing an ethnic Disney heroine such as Pocahontas, Esmeralda or Jasmine on Once Upon a Time, and was finally cast as the third in July 2016. David described preparing for the role as exciting yet "nerve-wracking," because "she's such an iconic and beloved character and all the fans have their idealism of what she should and shouldn't be," longing to please fans of both the original film and character.

Disney has gradually been introducing new, modified versions of princess costumes at the Walt Disney Parks and Resorts. In September 2016, Jasmine's outfit received a "modest" makeover; a redesigned, less revealing version of the character's blue outfit from the film debuted at both Disney World and Disneyland after 24 years. The costume consists of long sleeves, new shoes, full-length top concealing her midriff, high neckline, and a modified hairstyle while retaining the original turquoise-blue color from the films. Her pants have been replaced with a floor-length dress. A gold belt featuring an embroidered design of Rajah's face has also been added to the costume. Jasmine introduced her new outfit to guests with a public appearance at the first Mickey's Not-So-Scary Halloween Party. Although similar modifications were made to Pocahontas' and Mulan's costumes, Jasmine's redesign has inspired the most controversial response from the public. When questioned, park attendants and cast members explain that the redesigns were made to be more accurate to the cultures from which the characters hail, although Jasmine is from the fictional kingdom of Agrabah. Rachel Paige of HelloGiggles identified the main reason for the dramatic modifications is because several park guests were complaining about the character's exposed midriff and its effects on young girls; Paige defended that the outfit is in accordance to the location and time period, in which the film is set. The redesign is expected to gradually appear at other Disney theme parks around the world as well. Jasmine, along with Aladdin, is a meetable character at all the parks worldwide and is usually located in Adventureland.

== Reception ==
=== Critical response ===
Critical opinions of Jasmine have been generally mixed; some critics appreciated the character for continuing to "break the [passive] mold" that had been demonstrated by Disney's earliest princesses. Ty Burr of Entertainment Weekly described Jasmine as the "most full-bodied (in every sense) of the new Disney heroines," while Desson Howe of The Washington Post commended the character for providing the film with "feminist consciousness." The Christian Science Monitor's David Sterrit wrote that Jasmine "is less carefully worked out [than Aladdin] but equally likable as a personality type." Contactmusic.com agreed that the character exhibits "likeably cynical streaks," despite being an "essentially bland" character. Jasmine's strong-willed personality has frequently been both positively and negatively compared those of her predecessors Ariel and Belle. Gary Thompson of the Philadelphia Daily News wrote, "Princess Jasmine is also more barbed, yet without the obvious feminist makeover given to Belle." Similarly, James Berardinelli of ReelViews commended Jasmine for "show[ing] the same streak of stubborn independence exhibited by Ariel and Belle," but ultimately criticized the fact that "she doesn't fill a more pressing role than that of Aladdin's 'love interest'." Agreeing that Jasmine appears "bland" in comparison to Aladdin's supporting characters, Mari Ness of Tor.com wrote, "Jasmine follows in the footsteps of Ariel and Belle as someone unhappy with the restrictions of her world and her lack of choices: like both of them, she takes active steps to change this, and it's not entirely her fault that she's a secondary character in a film not all that interested in her ... She's perceptive, and fast thinking, but this isn't her movie, and in the end, although she does get to choose her own husband, she doesn't really get a chance, like Ariel and Belle, to move out of her world. She can be shown the world, but she stays in her palace." In a retrospective review, Texas Public Radio's Nathan Cone was pleasantly surprised "by how much of a leap forward the character of Jasmine was for the Disney storytellers," praising her boldness and intelligence, and preferring her over Belle.

Other critics have been much less forgiving; common critiques have derided the princess as a spoiled, shallow, bland, and overly sexualized character. Common Sense Media criticized Jasmine for lacking an original predicament and premise, while Creative Loafing's Matt Brunson described the character as a "liberated" but "stiff" heroine. Janet Maslin of The New York Times panned Jasmine: "the sloe-eyed Princess Jasmine ... a nymph in harem pants, use[s] words like 'fabulous' and 'amazing' to express unremarkable thoughts," concluding, "Luckily, [she is] surrounded by an overpowering array of secondary characters who make the film's sidelines much more interesting than its supposed center." Time Out called the character disappointing, and TV Guide described her as "bland." Film critic Roger Ebert cited Jasmine among the film's weaknesses, dismissing the relationship between her and Aladdin as "pale and routine" in comparison to Belle and the Beast's. Additionally, Ebert wrote that the characters "look unformed, as if even the filmmakers didn't see them as real individuals." Ed Gonzalez of Slant Magazine derided the character as "another 'free-spirited' type in the Barbie-doll tradition, a faux feminist who wants everyone to know that she can do everything the boys can." Orange Coast's film critic Henry A. Giroux dismissed Jasmine as little more than "an object of [Aladdin]'s immediate desire" and a "stepping stone to social mobility."

=== Feminist analysis ===
The reverse cover of Aladdin's original home video release proudly touted Jasmine as "a heroine of the 1990s." However, It's Not the Media: The Truth about Pop Culture's Influence on Children author Karen Sternheimer strongly disagreed with this sentiment, writing that despite being "strong-willed and almost given feminist qualities," Jasmine nonetheless "resembles heroines of old, waiting for her 'prince' to come and rescue her and using traditional feminine wiles to get her out of trouble." The character continues to be heavily discussed among feminist critics. Bustle included Jasmine's first encounter with Aladdin on the website's ranking of the most feminist Disney Princess moments, with author Samantha Rullo crediting the scene with demonstrating "how strong-willed and independent she truly is." In a similar "Feminist Ranking Of All The Disney Princesses," Bustle's Chelsea Maze appreciated Jasmine for refusing "to let the men in her life boss her around," ultimately placing the character at number eight because she possesses "the agency to choose her own mate and follow her heart, all while financially supporting the guy she loves." Mize concluded that Jasmine is "a pretty strong woman with a solid feminist streak."

Both feminist and Muslim critics have accused Jasmine of being "an offensive role model unworthy of showcasing to impressionable young girls." According to Meghan O'Keefe of Overthinking It, Jasmine possesses "tremendous" yet "ineffectual ... potential to be a feminist heroine" due to her lack of interest in books, music, social interaction, and "thirst for learning" that Ariel and Belle share. O'Keefe concluded, "Jasmine's complaints to Aladdin about palace life sound less like a budding feminist finding her voice, and more like the spoiled muse of Pulp's 'Common People'." Charles I. Schuster, author of Speculations: Readings in Culture, Identity, and Values, agreed that the character offers very little feminism apart from her "defiance of an arbitrary law." Bust's Sholeh Hajmiragha began by praising Jasmine's progressiveness: "she challenges her ascribed life as a princess, is skeptical of marriage, and, by falling in love with poor Aladdin, upsets the class system." However, in the end the author criticized the character for being "very sexualized," explaining "while female sexuality is something to be proud and in control of, it maybe isn't the best message for young girls." Opening that Jasmine's role lacks significance, Feminist Fiction deemed her an example of how "Disney treats its female characters when they're not the protagonist of the story," elaborating "it looks like Disney put a lot of effort into giving Jasmine girl power and independence, at least in her dialogue and attitude," but "didn't follow through and give her strength in the plot itself." The website also observed that the character's feminism does not appear to extend beyond "lip service," ultimately criticizing Jasmine of using her sexuality instead of her intelligence to "save the day" before finally reverting to the role of a damsel in distress awaiting rescue. The Routledge Companion to Media & Gender author Cynthia Carter believes that Jasmine becomes "the possession of [her] husband" by the end of the film.

Within the realm of the internet, the scene during which Jasmine kisses Jafar in order to distract him from Aladdin is oftentimes viewed as a point of contention among feminist writers and bloggers; Meredith Ancret of The Snark Who Hunts Back argued that both the Sultan and Genie are similarly enslaved by Jafar. Ancret continued to defend Jasmine for being of her own mind, bravely defying Jafar on numerous occasions, and praised her distraction of the villain for being instrumental to Aladdin's success. Also defending Jasmine's decision to kiss Jafar, feminist critic Mari Rogers explained to The Daily Dot that "Jasmine was a strong character and I think in many ways the story's focus on Aladdin sort of makes us forget this," concluding, "Even in her own movie, she was always the force behind her decisions. She went out seeking things." Awarding Aladdin a "neutral" grade in terms of feminism, Fanny Pack wrote that "What stops Aladdin from being wholly negative ... is the sheer strength of Jasmine as a character," who "seems to take the best parts of Ariel and Belle and build them into an even better, stronger, and sassier princess."

BuzzFeed compiled a list citing "15 Times Jasmine From Aladdin Was The Most Feminist Disney Princess." The same website included Jasmine rejecting traditional standards of marriage second on its list of "27 Feminist Disney Moments That Unapologetically Smashed The Patriarchy." Sonia Saraiya of Nerve ranked Jasmine fifth in her article "Ranked: Disney Princesses From Least To Most Feminist." Saraiya praised her personality, likening her boldness, curiosity, and skepticism of marriage to that of Belle while commending her for "falling for a completely inadequate 'street rat' and whisking him out of poverty, instead of the other way around." However, Saraiya labeled Jasmine's use of sexuality her "only power," criticizing her for sending a negative message to young girls. When questioned about whether or not Jasmine is a positive role model because "all she wants to do is get married," Larkin herself defended her character, explaining, "That's not true. Jasmine says to a generation of little kids about marriage that the law is wrong. She risks everything—her safety, her comfort, everything she knows—and goes out and finds a way to change the marriage law ... Yeah, she's a good role model!' Really good! Whether it's connected or not, that person that the writers created that I got to portray, I'm so proud of her. And I feel like she was ahead of her time."

=== Racial controversy ===
Famously, Jasmine was Disney's first princess of color; her unprecedented ethnicity is credited with ultimately inspiring the studio to become more ethnically diverse, as evidenced by the subsequent introduction of their non-white princesses Pocahontas and Mulan. Universally accepted, the character's status as Disney's first Arab princess "won over hearts" upon the film's 1992 release, according to Andre Tartar of Vulture. However, while the fact that the princess is Middle Eastern is considered to be "a breakthrough," at the same time the characteristics of both Jasmine and Aladdin have been met with controversy; observers widely criticized the characters for being Westernized and Anglicized. In her book Thinking Class: Sketches from a Cultural Worker, author Joanna Kadi joked that Jasmine is "as Arab as baseball and apple pie." The American-Arab Anti-Discrimination Committee was particularly disgruntled by the treatment of the lead characters, with Don Bustany accusing Disney of teaching "that anyone with an accent is bad." The Arabian Nights Reader author Ulrich Marzolph observed that the character speaks "perfect American English" despite her "ostensibly Middle Eastern features," and have conveniently American accents in spite of their "alleged Arab ethnicity." In his book The Mouse that Roared: Disney and the End of Innocence, author Henry A. Giroux accused "the anglicized Jasmine and Aladdin" of communicating in American English, while the film's villains have strong foreign accents.

Critics have also derided that the film's "bad" characters appear to be exaggerated in appearance, overweight, drawn with dark skin, large noses and damaged teeth, while Jasmine's skin tone remains lighter in comparison. Slim in stature, Jasmine also lacks obvious character flaws in both her personality and speech. Uprooting Racism: How White People Can Work for Racial Justice Ð 3rd Edition author Paul Kivel dubbed this "racial coding," a practice also believed to have been used to differentiate the good from bad characters in The Lion King (1994). According to Debating Disney: Pedagogical Perspectives on Commercial Cinema author Douglas Brode, Aladdin "perpetuates the same racial pyramid" present in most of Disney's films, observing that Jasmine, Aladdin and the Sultan – characters at high up on the social hierarchy – appear to be the film's "whitest" characters, while the villainous Jafar speaks with a thick accent and exhibits far more Arabian features. Brode accused Jasmine of "perpetuat[ing] damaging stereotypes." Observing that "underneath their multicultural skin [Disney Princesses] all conform to the white, middle-class, thin, feminine ideal of beauty," Gary Burns, author of A Companion to Popular Culture, described Jasmine as "an American-accented girl ... who battles the traditions of older, heavily accented, traditional Arabs." Despite Disney's attempt to accurately portray the culture of the time period during which the film is set such as a lack of women in powerful positions, Isabel Santaolalla, author of "New" Exoticisms: Changing Patterns in the Construction of Otherness, agreed that Jasmine remains "a vehicle for contemporary gender politics in America" despite her Middle Eastern appearance, explaining, "the film's PC credibility is reserved for Jasmine, but this feistiness probably reflects developments in America more than the realities of 1990s Basrah or Baghdad." Critics also did not appreciate the scene in which Jasmine nearly gets her hand cut off by a merchant as punishment for unintentionally stealing an apple.

== Impact and legacy ==
According to The Fiscal Times, Aladdin is Disney's fourth most profitable princess film in terms of box office returns. Having successfully established herself as a popular character, Jasmine ultimately became one of the original members of the Disney Princess franchise, and remains the only member of the lineup who is not the main character of her film. Consequently, Aladdin remains the only Disney Princess film whose featured princess is not its protagonist, and Jasmine became the first Disney Princess to marry a character who is not a prince by birth. Chronologically, Jasmine is the Disney Princess franchise's sixth member, and is considered to be one of the "classic" members of the lineup. The film Aladdin and the character of Jasmine are credited with beginning an expansion of Disney's princess characters. Before the character debuted, all of Disney's princesses in the studio's 55-year history had been either white or European in appearance. As Disney's first non-white and Arab princess, Jasmine is credited with introducing both racial and ethnic diversity to Disney's animated fairy tale genre. The character has since been succeeded by four princesses of color: Pocahontas from the eponymous 1995 film, Mulan from the eponymous 1998 film, Tiana from The Princess and the Frog (2009), Moana from the eponymous 2016 film, ultimately "paving the way in letting children believe that anyone of any race can be a princess." The quintet is believed to have helped diversify the studio and introduce "new visions of what a 'Disney Princess' could be." Additionally, as one of only two Disney Princesses who wear pants (the other being Mulan), Jasmine remains Disney's only princess whose official costume is not a gown or dress. According to Vanity Fair, Jasmine was the first feminist Disney Princess, although author Alex Beggs admitted that this claim has been exaggerated to some degree.

There's real chemistry between Jasmine and Aladdin. There's a reason "A Whole New World" is still cited as one of the most romantic moments in movie history. Soaring over the rooftop palaces of Agrabah on the magic carpet, audiences fell in love with Jasmine just as Aladdin did.

— Screen Rant's Andrew Martin on Jasmine's influence.

Jasmine's song "A Whole New World," which she performs as a duet with Aladdin, won the Academy Award for Best Original Song at the 65th Academy Awards in 1993. Six years after Aladdin, Lea Salonga would be cast as the singing voice of Mulan in 1998. Salonga joked about being required to audition for the role despite having already voiced a Disney Princess: "Why do I have to audition? ... I was already a princess before. Wasn't that enough?" Meanwhile, Larkin would return to voice Jasmine several times in subsequent media appearances, including films, television series and video games. As the two actresses responsible for giving voice to the character, both Larkin and Salonga were honored with Disney Legends Awards for their contributions in 2011 at a ceremony recognized for awarding several other actresses who famously voiced Disney Princesses. In addition to songwriters Menken and Tim Rice, Salonga jokingly thanked Larkin in her acceptance speech for not being able to sing thus providing her with a job opportunity. Salonga became the Disney Legend Award's first Filipina recipient; her hand print is also imprinted at the Walt Disney headquarters in Burbank, California.

Jasmine is now revered as an iconic character and princess. Teen Vogue included Jasmine in an article recognizing the "10 Best Disney Princesses of All Time." BuzzFeed ranked Jasmine second on their "Definitive Ranking Of Disney Princesses" list, while E! placed character at number four. According to PureWow, Jasmine is the fifth best Disney Princess because she "was not OK with her family marrying her off to some random suitor." Seventeen placed the character at number nine on a similar countdown. Author Jelani Addams Rosa wrote, "Our favorite thing about Jasmine is that her and Aladdin take turns rescuing each other," but at the same criticized her for being too judgmental. On MTV's "Ultimate Ranking of the Best Disney Princesses of All Time," Jasmine finished 10th. Refinery29 readers voted Jasmine the eighth greatest Disney Princess, garnering 351 votes. Seventeen ranked Jasmine the hottest Disney Princess, crediting her with initiating several young boys' sexual awakenings during 1992. Complex placed Jasmine second in its article "The 25 Hottest Cartoon Women Of All Time," praising her hair and her eyes. Screen Rant ranked Jasmine the 14th best animated film character of all time, calling her "the cool idol that we aspired to be like" and concluding that "the movie would truly not be the same if it weren't for the Princess Jasmine." Cosmopolitan placed Jasmine's signature blue outfit at number eight on the magazine's ranking of "The 37 Best Disney Princess Outfits," praising her for pulling off "a wide, jeweled headband, statement earrings, and a heavy necklace all at once without becoming overwhelmed by them."

It was announced in April 2026 that Jasmine will appear in the sequel series to Sofia the First, entitled Sofia the First: Royal Magic, with Jasmine providing "wisdom and guidance" with the protagonist, Sofia.
