= Michael James Scott =

American actor and singer (born 1981)

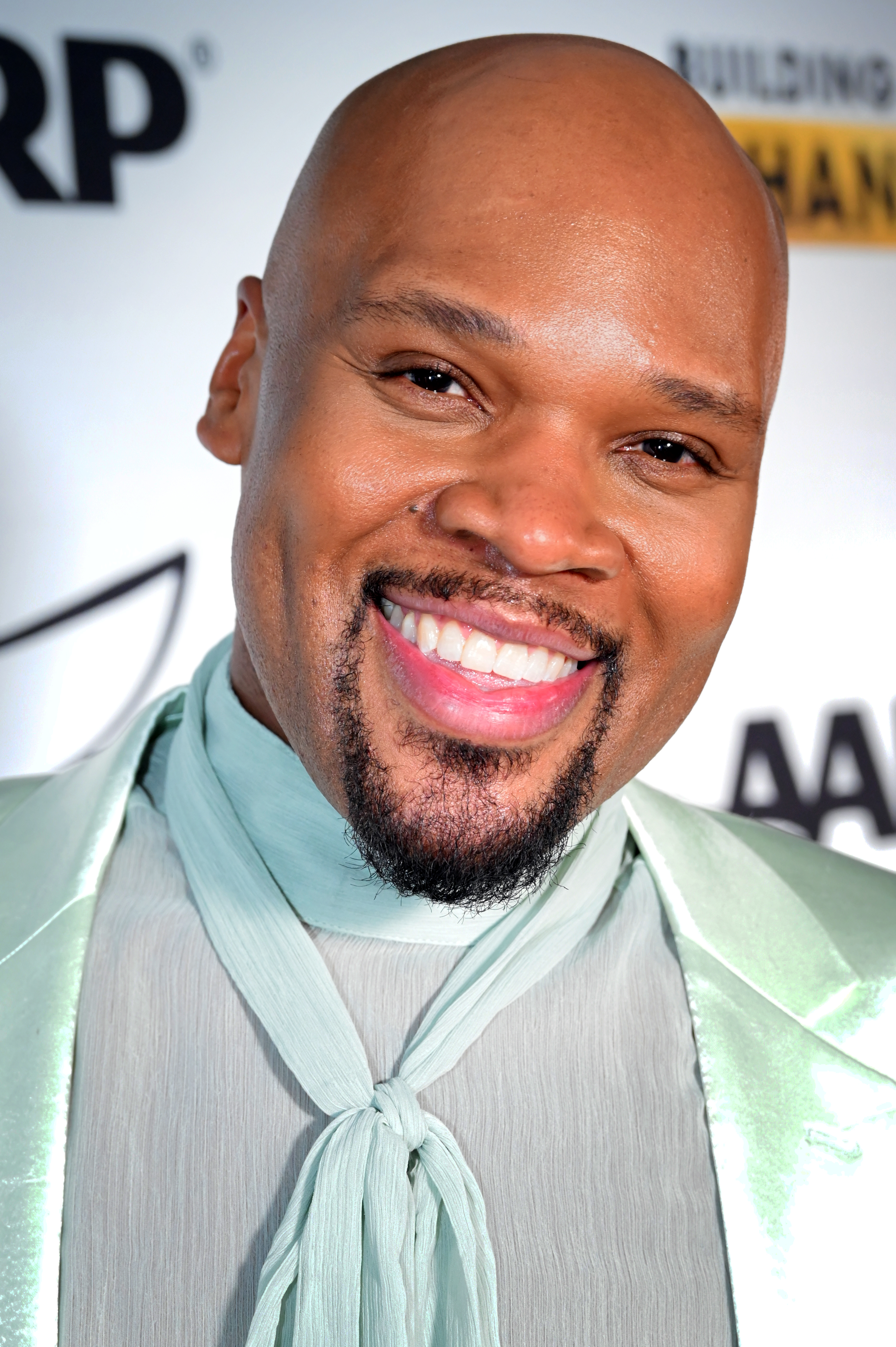
- Scott in 2026
- Born: May 24, 1981 (age 45); Baltimore, Maryland
- Years active: 2001–present
- Spouse: Jeremy Merrifield

Michael James Scott (born May 24, 1981) is an American actor and singer, known for his work on the Broadway stage. He is best known for playing the Genie in Disney's Aladdin musical in the Original Australian Cast, as well as in the West End, U.S. National Tour, and Broadway productions.

== Early life ==
Scott was born in Baltimore, Maryland, the son of Michael and Karen Scott. He attended Rock Springs Elementary school in Apopka, Florida, then Robinswood and Gotha Middle School. In high school, he attended the Dr. Phillips High School Visual and Performing Arts Program.

Michael worked as a child actor doing commercials, TV shows, and musicals; he also sang in concerts around the Central Florida area. He trained with Ann Reinking's Broadway Theatre Project for four years, two as an assistant.

== Career ==
As a young adult Michael got a string of TV work, theatre shows and singing engagements, before getting his BFA degree at The Conservatory of Theatre Arts program at Webster University in St. Louis, Missouri. While in college, he was the standby for Ben Vereen on the international tour of Fosse from 2003 to 2004. He joined the first National U.S. tour of Mamma Mia! from 2004 to 2005. In 2005, he made his Broadway debut in 2005 in the musical All Shook Up. He appeared off-Broadway opposite Donna McKechnie in Here's to the Public. In 2006, after a short stint in Disney's Tarzanon Broadway, he reprised his Mamma Mia! role of Eddie in the Broadway production. In 2007, he was in the original Broadway company for Boublil and Schönberg's new musical The Pirate Queen. In 2008, he was a part of the concert cast of Jerry Springer: The Opera at Carnegie Hall and shortly afterwards went on to originate Barry Belson (actor)in the Las Vegas production of Jersey Boys. He returned to Broadway in 2009 in a revival of Hair, continuing on to the West End production the following year, for which he was also associate choreographer. At the end of that year, he returned to Broadway in the original cast of Elf, until it closed in 2011. He then played Dr. Gostwana in the original Broadway company of The Book of Mormon. During his time in Book of Mormon, he took a short break to play Donkey in Shrek The Musical at the MUNY of St. Louis before finally leaving Mormon in 2013. He joined the original Broadway company of Disney's Aladdin musical as the Genie standby. In 2015, he left to originate the Minstrel in Something Rotten! on Broadway.

Scott cohosts the podcast HypeFriend with Ashley Eckstein, which began in 2025.

In 2026, Scott featured in the Scrubs revival series as Nurse Francois Dubois.

== Theatre credits ==
- Ragtime, North Carolina Theatre
- Cinderella, The Muny
- South Pacific, The Muny
- Fosse, standby for Ben Vereen, Tour, 2001–02
- Mamma Mia!, Eddie, Tour, 2003–04
- All Shook Up, Ensemble, Broadway, 2005
- Here's to the Public!, off-Broadway, 2005
- Tarzan, Swing, Broadway, 2006
- Aida, Mereb, The Muny, 2006
- Mamma Mia!, Eddie (replacement), Broadway, 2006–07
- The Pirate Queen, Ensemble, Broadway, 2007
- Jersey Boys, Ensemble/Barry Belson (u/s), Las Vegas, 2008
- Jerry Springer: The Opera, Carnegie Hall, 2008
- Hair, Swing/Margaret Mead (u/s)/Hud (u/s), Broadway, 2009
- Hair, associate choreographer/Hud (u/s)/Tribe Member, West End, 2010
- Elf, Ensemble/Macy's Manager (u/s), Broadway, 2010–11
- The Book of Mormon, Dr. Gostwana, Broadway, 2011–12
- Here's to Joe, off-Broadway, 2013
- Shrek the Musical, Donkey, The Muny, 2013
- Aladdin, Genie standby/Babkak standby, Broadway, 2014–15
- Something Rotten!, Minstrel, Broadway, 2015-16
- Aladdin, Genie, Australian Tour, 2016–2017
- Aladdin, Genie, North American Tour, Jan-Aug 2018, Jan-Feb 2020
- Aladdin, Genie, West End, Aug 2018-Feb 2019
- Aladdin, Genie, Broadway, Feb-Sept 2019, Feb 2020–May 2026
- Gutenberg! The Musical!, The Producer, Broadway, Dec 2023
- La Cage aux Folles, Albin, The Muny, 2025

== Filmography ==
- South Park, special thanks, 1 episode, 2011
- The Carrie Diaries, Hot Gay Guy No. 1, 1 episode, 2013
- The Broadway.com Show, himself, 1 episode, 2013
- Submissions Only, William Fox, 1 episode, 2014
- The Tonight Show Starring Jimmy Fallon, Minstrel, 1 episode, 2015
- For Real, Michael, TV movie, post-production, 2016 (also producer)
- Black Monday Chad, 1 episode, 2019
- General Hospital as himself

== Personal life ==
Scott married filmmaker Jeremy Merrifield after dating for ten years and knowing each other for about twenty.
