= Arielle Jacobs =

American actress and singer

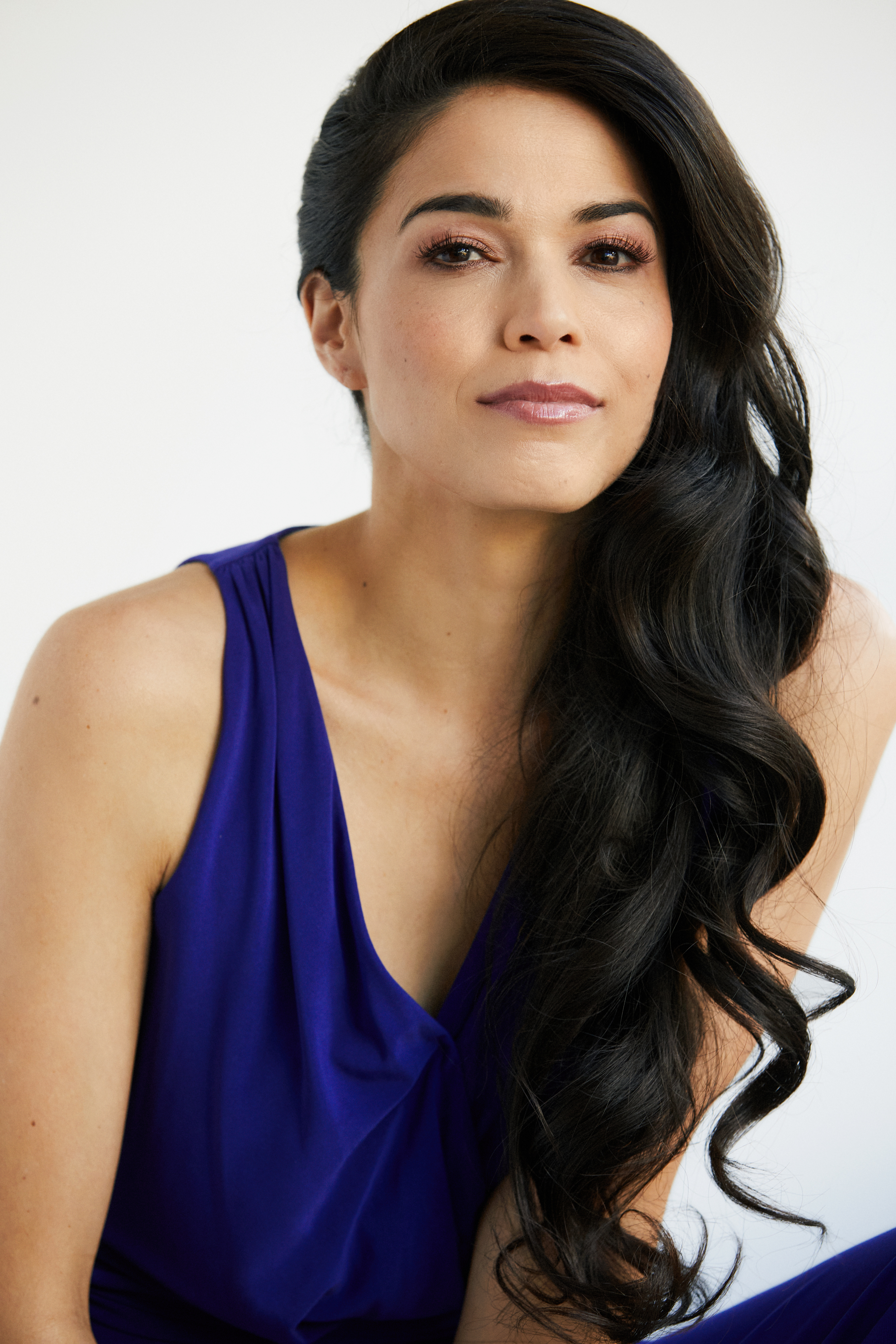
- Jacobs photographed by Nathan Johnson at Drift Studios
- Education: New York University - Steinhardt
- Occupations: Actress, singer
- Years active: 2007–present
- Spouse: J.J. Caruncho (m. 2020)
- Website: ariellejacobs.com

Arielle Jacobs is an American singer and actress, mostly seen on stage in musicals. She is best known for her roles as Nina Rosario in the US Tour and Broadway productions of In the Heights and as Princess Jasmine in the Australian and Broadway productions of Aladdin.

Jacobs originated the role of Gabriella Montez in the First National Tour of High School Musical on Stage!. She also originated the role of Imelda Marcos in the Broadway production of David Byrne and Fatboy Slim’s Here Lies Love.

== Biography ==
Dancing since the age of three, Jacobs studied ballet, tap, and jazz. Her first time in front of an audience was at the age of seven, portraying a Christmas present in a school play. After moving to Princeton, New Jersey in her early teens, Jacobs attended Princeton High School, where she performed with the Princeton High School Choir. She graduated from New York University with a Bachelor of Music Degree in Vocal Performance.

She began studying voice at the San Francisco Conservatory of Music, and later at the Westminster Conservatory of Music. Her first taste of professional theatre came at the age of ten when she was cast in a new musical called Honor Song for Crazy Horse at the Mountain View Center for Performing Arts in California.

Jacobs takes an active interest in environmentalism and animal rights, and created an environmental website called "Help Heal the Earth" to teach kids about living an eco-friendly life. She also founded a non-profit organization called The Girls Camaraderie Project, which aims to inspire camaraderie among girls ages 10–13, and runs this organization with Broadway star Lexi Lawson (who played Eliza in the musical Hamilton).

Jacobs married actor J.J. Caruncho on March 6, 2020, in Tulum, Mexico.

== Career ==
She has starred in several Broadway shows. Her Broadway debut was playing Nina Rosario in the closing cast of In The Heights, opposite creator Lin-Manuel Miranda. She played Jasmine in Disney's Aladdin on Broadway, after originating the role in the Australian Production in August 2016. Other musical productions include Wicked on Broadway, as well as Rent, Disney's High School Musical, Shakespeare's Two Gentleman of Verona, and Into the Woods where she performed opposite Tituss Burgess.

Off-Broadway, she has starred in two world-premiere plays by Nilo Cruz: Sotto Voce, and the one-woman show Farhad or the Secret of Being which was filmed for the Lincoln Center Public Library Archives. She performed in the Guggenheim Museum’s "Works & Process" series, singing songs from a new adaption of Georges Bizet's Carmen with the Tectonic Theater Project. In 2022, Jacobs reprised her role as Delilah in the off-Broadway premiere of Between the Lines based on the book of the same title by Jodi Picoult and Samantha Van Leer. The production recorded a cast album that was released in January 2023.

In April 2023 it was announced that she would be returning to Broadway in the role of Imelda Marcos in David Byrne and Fatboy Slim’s Here Lies Love.

She has been a frequent guest performer at Walt Disney World during the Epcot Festival of the Arts. Along with her brother they perform for the Broadway Concert Series at the America Gardens Theatre.

== Recordings ==
Her debut solo album A Leap in the Dark: Live at Feinstein's / 54 Below was released by Broadway Records in June 2018. It is a live recording of her autobiographical concert, telling the story of the most formative moments of her life. It includes music by Celine Dion and Sarah McLachlan along with songs from many of the musical theater roles that she's played; the album features Nicholas Christopher (Hamilton, Miss Saigon) and Javier Colon (The Voice season 1 winner).

Her voice is also featured on her brother Adam Jacobs debut solo album entitled Right Where I Belong, Daniel and Laura Curtis album Overture, as well as on both Carols For a Cure albums vol.17 and vol.21, and the Off-Broadway cast album of her solo performance in Inner Voice's Farhad or the Secret of Being.

== Stage credits ==
| Year | Title | Role | Theater | Notes |
|---|---|---|---|---|
| 2007 | Disney's High School Musical | Gabriella Montez | Various | National Tour |
| 2009 | In the Heights | Nina Rosario | Various | National Tour |
| 2010–2011 | In the Heights | Nina Rosario | Richard Rodgers Theatre | Broadway Debut She played the role from November 15, 2010, to the show's closing on January 9, 2011 |
| 2015 | Wicked | Nessarose | Gershwin Theatre | Broadway production |
| 2015 | Into the Woods | The Baker's Wife | Arsht Center | Miami, Florida |
| 2016 | Aladdin | Princess Jasmine | Capitol Theatre, Sydney; Her Majesty's Theatre, Melbourne | Australian production Jacobs performed her last show as Princess Jasmine on December 4, 2016 |
| 2017 | Between The Lines | Delilah | Kansas City Rep | World premiere musical based on book by Jodi Picoult and Samantha Van Leer |
| 2018–2020 | Aladdin | Princess Jasmine | New Amsterdam Theatre | Broadway production |
| 2022 | Between The Lines | Delilah | Second Stage Theatre | Off-Broadway Premiere |
| 2023 | Here Lies Love | Imelda Marcos | Broadway Theatre | Broadway production |
| 2025 | Into the Woods | Cinderella | Samsung Performing Arts Theater | Philippine production by Theatre Group Asia |
