= Pinewood Studios =

British film and television studio

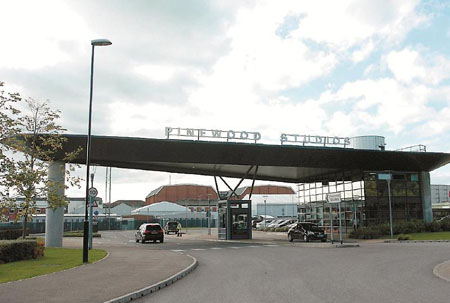
- Pinewood Studios gateway

General information
- Location: Iver, England, Pinewood Road, Iver, Buckinghamshire, SL0 0NH
- Coordinates: 51.548611°N 0.535°W
- Opening: 30 September 1936
- Owner: Pinewood Group (2001–present)

Website
- Pinewood Studios

Pinewood Studios is a British film and television studio located in the village Iver Heath, England, 18 miles (29 km) west of central London.

Opened in 1936, the studio has been the base for many productions from major films to television programmes, commercials, and pop promos, including the James Bond, Star Wars, Marvel Cinematic Universe and Carry On film franchises, as well as several of the works of Powell and Pressburger.

== History ==
Pinewood Studios was built on the estate of Heatherden Hall, a large Victorian country house which was purchased by Canadian financier and Member of Parliament (MP) for Brentford and Chiswick Lt. Col. Grant Morden (1880–1932). He added refinements such as a ballroom, a Victorian-style Turkish bath, and an indoor squash court. Due to its seclusion, it was used as a discreet meeting place for high-ranking politicians and diplomats: the agreement to create the Anglo-Irish Treaty was signed there.

In 1934, building tycoon Charles Boot (1874–1945) bought the land and turned it into a country club. The ballroom was converted into a restaurant and many of the bedrooms became furnished suites.

=== 1930s ===
In 1935, millionaire flour magnate J. Arthur Rank (1888–1972) went into partnership with Boot and they transformed the estate into a film studio. Boot based designs for the studio complex on the latest ideas being employed by film studios in Hollywood, California. Boot named the new studio Pinewood because "of the number of trees which grow there and because it seemed to suggest something of the American film centre in its second syllable". Construction began in December of that year, with a new stage completed every three weeks. The studios were finished nine months later, having cost £1 million (approx. £61.1 million at 2024 prices). Five stages were initially completed and there was provision for an enclosed water tank capable of holding 65,000 imperial gallons (300,000 L), which is still in use. In the years that followed, he also undertook further work on both the Pinewood Film Studios and the Denham Film Studios, both of which had by then become a part of the newly-formed Rank Organisation.

On 30 September 1936, the studio complex was officially opened by Dr Leslie Burgin, Parliamentary Secretary to the Board of Trade. The first film director to use the facilities was Herbert Wilcox, completing London Melody (1937) featuring Anna Neagle (his wife), portions of which had already been filmed at British and Dominions Imperial Studios in Elstree, before a fire there halted production. The first film to be made entirely at Pinewood was Talk of the Devil (1936), directed by Carol Reed.

There followed a prolific period of Pinewood and British film history, with Pinewood following the studios adopting the "unit system", an American industry practice. That enabled several pictures to be filmed simultaneously and, ultimately, Pinewood achieved the highest output of any studio in the world.

=== 1940s ===
During the Second World War, Pinewood was requisitioned, and the Crown Film Unit, No. 5 Army Film and Photographic Unit, Royal Air Force Film Production Unit, and Polish Air Force Film Unit were based there. The Crown Film Unit completed many classic wartime documentaries, and Roy Boulting's Desert Victory, Humphrey Jennings' Fires Were Started, Coastal Command and Pat Jackson's Western Approaches (all 1943) were filmed there during that period. As well as its use by the armed forces, the Royal Mint and Lloyd's of London were installed on sound stages at Pinewood, and were open for business for the duration of the war.

The Company of Youth, the Rank Organisation acting school, which launched several film careers, was founded in 1945. The next year, Pinewood re-opened for (non-war-related) business.

Two significant films produced at Pinewood were released within two months of each other in 1948: Oliver Twist, directed by David Lean, and Powell and Pressburger's The Red Shoes. Due to a shortfall in funds, brought about by financial overspends the previous year, Rank did not have enough money to market The Red Shoes sufficiently at first in the US, but it became Rank's biggest earner up to that point, grossing over £1 million by 1951 (the equivalent of £35.9 million in 2024 terms).

In the same year, John Davis was appointed managing director. By the following year, Rank had run up an overdraft of £16 million (the equivalent of £635 million in 2024), and announced a loss of £3.5 million, mainly due to big budget flops. One of the largest of these had been Caesar and Cleopatra (1945), which was originally budgeted at £250,000, but which eventually cost £1,278,000 (the equivalent of £61.8 million in 2024).

=== 1950s ===
The Doctor film series, produced by Betty Box and directed by Ralph Thomas, began with Doctor in the House (1954), the most successful film at the box-office of its year in Great Britain. All of the Doctor films, running until 1970, were shot at Pinewood. The Carry On franchise began in 1958, produced on behalf of Rank by Peter Rogers (who was married to Box), and directed by Gerald Thomas (brother of Ralph). The Norman Wisdom comedies, the last of which was released in 1966, were also filmed at the facility.

=== 1960s ===
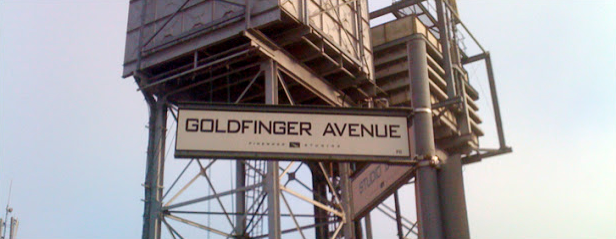
Goldfinger Avenue

During the 1960s, Pinewood was no longer solely dependent on the Rank Organisation to fill its stages. "Renters" (producers hiring the sound stages for a film-by-film agreement) were using half of the stages as Pinewood turned into a four walls facility. The James Bond franchise began at Pinewood with Terence Young directing Dr. No (1962), and has continued to be based at the studios since then.

J. Arthur Rank (by then Lord Rank) retired as chairman in 1962 and was succeeded by John Davis, who had begun to move the Rank Organisation away from mass film production and towards more profitable and less risky businesses such as bingo and holidays.

=== 1970s ===
During the 1970s, Pinewood studios were being used more for television programmes, including ITC Entertainment's UFO (1970), The Persuaders! (1971), starring Tony Curtis and Roger Moore, and Space: 1999 (1975–1977). Major films shot at Pinewood included Fiddler on the Roof (1971), Sleuth (1972), The Day of the Jackal (1973), Superman (1978) and Superman II (1980), Alien (1979) and Bugsy Malone (1976), and the James Bond films Diamonds Are Forever (1971), Live and Let Die (1973), The Man with the Golden Gun (1974), and The Spy Who Loved Me (1977).

=== 1980s ===
Four James Bond movies, For Your Eyes Only (1981), Octopussy (1983), A View to a Kill (1985), and The Living Daylights (1987), among several other large productions, such as Pink Floyd – The Wall (1982), Superman III (1983), Krull (1983), Legend (1985), Aliens (1986), Stanley Kubrick's Full Metal Jacket (1987), Santa Claus: The Movie (1985) and Tim Burton's Batman (1989), were all produced at Pinewood.

=== 1990s ===
The 1990s saw large-scale productions, such as Alien 3 (1992), Tomorrow Never Dies (1997), and The World Is Not Enough (1999) produced at the studios which kept Pinewood operating.

=== 2000s ===
The Rank Group owned the studio until 2001, when it sold Pinewood for £62 million to a group led by Michael Grade and Ivan Dunleavy and financed by private equity group 3i, who held an 80% stake. The purchase of Shepperton Studios from a consortium headed by Ridley and Tony Scott, gave rise to the Pinewood Group, eventually comprising Pinewood Studios, Shepperton Studios, Teddington Studios, Pinewood Toronto Studios, Pinewood Indomina Studios, Pinewood Studio Berlin, Pinewood Iskandar Malaysia Studios, and a joint venture in the US with Pinewood Atlanta Studios.

In 2009, Pinewood and Shepperton received a BAFTA Award for their Outstanding British Contribution to Cinema.

=== 2010s ===
The Pinewood Studios Group was subject to a hostile takeover approach in 2011. Manchester-based The Peel Group acquired a 73% stake, but Warren James Jewellers retained a 27% stake, so preventing a full takeover. In 2012 Financial Services Authority considered cancelling the stock market listing because nearly all the shares are held by two groups. In June 2016, five new stages and 10 new workshops were opened at Pinewood.

In 2019, the Walt Disney Studios announced a 10-year lease of most of the Pinewood Studios in September 2019, to start in 2020.

=== 2020s ===
In 2025, Marvel Studios moved their main production servers and offices to Pinewood Studios, starting predominantly with the productions of Phase Six films The Fantastic Four: First Steps, Spider-Man: Brand New Day, co-produced with Sony, and Avengers: Doomsday and Avengers: Secret Wars, as well as the show VisionQuest.

== Stages, studios and locations ==
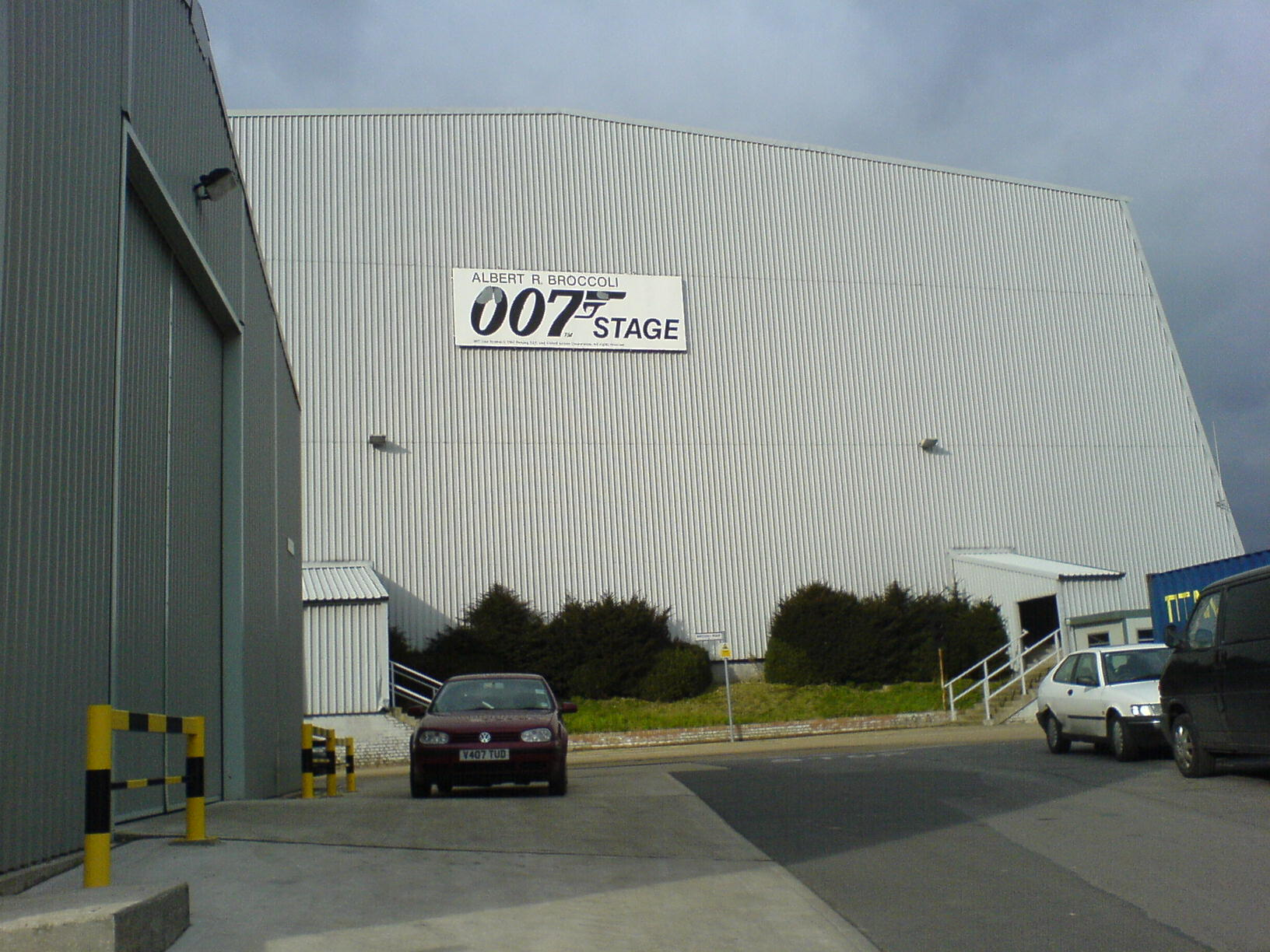
The 007 stage at Pinewood Studios in March 2006, before the July fire and rebuilding

The 007 Stage was originally built for the Bond film The Spy Who Loved Me (1977); it had one of the largest water tanks in Europe. The stage was destroyed by fire in 1984; it was rebuilt four months later and renamed Albert R. Broccoli's 007 Stage in time to film A View to a Kill. Another fire on 30 July 2006 seriously damaged the stage, causing the roof to partly collapse. Construction of a new stage began on 18 September and was completed in under six months. Since then, the stage has accommodated large productions including Prince of Persia: The Sands of Time (2010), Quantum of Solace (2008). The whole fishing village from Mamma Mia! (2008) was built on the stage.

As well as the 007 Stage, which is the largest stage at any of the studios under The Pinewood Studios Group at 5,500 m^{2} (59,202 sq ft), the studio has fifteen other stages ranging from just 160 m^{2} (1,722 sq ft), to cater for productions of all sizes. One of those studios, the T Stage, is a specialist stage for both television and film productions and the Studios second largest stage at 2,800 m^{2} (30,139 sq ft).

Pinewood Studios paid tribute to Richard Attenborough's body of work by naming a purpose-built film and television stage after him. The Richard Attenborough Stage has an area of 2,800 m^{2} (30,139 sq ft). In his absence because of illness, Lord Puttnam and Pinewood chairman Lord Grade officially unveiled the stage on 23 April 2012. Opposite it is a post-production block named in honour of Stanley Kubrick.

The studio also has two specialist TV studios, TV One and TV Two, complete with galleries, TV studio floors, TV lighting grids and SD or HD facilities. Both studios stand at just under 835 m^{2} (8,988 sq ft).

Pinewood sits on the old estate of Heatherden Hall. The mansion, its gardens, and other parts of the studios have been used in various productions over the years. Peeping Tom (1960) shows people driving out through the main gate and has various shots in the studios (showing things behind the camera), offices and corridors. Return to the Edge of the World (1978) includes shots of director Michael Powell driving into the studio. The main gate (no longer used due to the construction of a purpose-built security entrance 500 m (1,600 ft) further along the road) also features in My Week with Marilyn (2011) when Eddie Redmayne greets Judi Dench. This film also contains many shots of the dressing-room corridors in the main make-up block. Heatherden Hall (converted to production offices) has appeared in several films: it was made to look fire-damaged and derelict for the children's film The Amazing Mr Blunden (1972) and also appeared as the Indian residence of Governor Sir Sidney Ruff-Diamond in Carry On Up the Khyber (1969).

The studios have acres of backlots where large sets have been built, from castles to whole villages including the Baker Street set built for Billy Wilder's The Private Life of Sherlock Holmes and Godric's Hollow from the Harry Potter film series.

=== Burnham Beeches and Black Park ===
The proximity of the ancient woodland Burnham Beeches and Black Park to Pinewood (as well as to Shepperton and Bray studios) made Burnham Beeches a desirable filming location for productions being filmed at Pinewood. Burnham Beeches was used for Robin Hood Prince of Thieves, First Knight, Goldfinger, The Princess Bride, Harry Potter and the Order of the Phoenix, and Black Park used for Fahrenheit 451.

=== Former ===
==== Pinewood Atlanta Studios ====
The studios announced in April 2013 that its first film production facility in the United States would be located south of Atlanta at a complex consisting of 280 ha (690 acres) in Fayette County, Georgia. Pinewood Atlanta is a joint venture between Pinewood and River's Rock LLC, an independently managed trust of the Cathy family, founders of the Chick-fil-A fast-food chain.

In August 2019, Pinewood sold their shares in the Atlanta location. The studio officially ended its relationship with the location in October 2020 with the renaming of the studio to Trilith.

==== Pinewood Iskandar Malaysia Studios ====
Pinewood Iskandar Malaysia Studios is a studio complex located at a 20 ha (49 acres) site in Iskandar Puteri, Johor, managed by The Pinewood Studios Group. It targets the Asia-Pacific region. Pinewood Shepperton plc entered into a strategic agreement with Khazanah Nasional Berhad, the investment holding arm of the Government of Malaysia in connection with the development of a new film and television studio facility in Iskandar Malaysia.

Construction began towards the end of 2010, with completion expected by the end of 2012. The facilities being built as part of the studio complex include 9,300 m^{2} (100,000 sq ft) of film stages, ranging from 1,400 m^{2} (15,000 sq ft) to 2,800 m^{2} (30,000 sq ft). The first two at 1,400 m^{2} (15,000 sq ft) while the other two at 1,900 m^{2} (20,000 sq ft). The biggest stage at 2,800 m^{2} (30,000 sq ft) will have a water tank for productions that require work on or under water. There are 2 TV studios, each at 1,100 m^{2} (12,000 sq ft).

In July 2019, Pinewood Iskandar Malaysia Studios was rebranded to Iskandar Malaysia Studios and the affiliation with Pinewood Shepperton plc ended.

=== Water filming ===
Pinewood's water filming facilities include the Underwater Stage, and an Exterior Tank backed with a green screen measuring 73 m × 18 m (240 ft × 59 ft).

== Project Pinewood ==
In November 2007, Pinewood announced a £200m expansion plan, known as Project Pinewood. It would have included replicas of streetscapes and zones replicating locations from the UK, Europe and the United States. Planned zones included a college campus, Amsterdam, modern European housing, Venice, Lake Como, Paris, an amphitheatre, Prague, west coast American housing, warehousing and downtown New York sets, Chicago, Vienna, a castle, a UK canal, Chinatown and a London street market. In addition, it would have also been used as residential housing, with the proposed creative community, expected to be in the region of 2000 and 2250, being integrated with the film locations. Following consultations with the local community, the plans changed to reflect the community's opinions and suggestions. However, the planning application was rejected by South Bucks District Council in October 2009, following a opposition campaign by local residents, who formed a "Stop Project Pinewood" group.

Pinewood appealed against the decision and a public inquiry commenced on 5 April 2011 and on 20 January 2012, it was announced that the appeal had been turned down. On 15 May 2013, local councillors in South Buckinghamshire rejected a pared down version of the expansion plans. The chief executive of the studios, Ivan Dunleavy, said he expected to appeal against the latest decision to the Secretary of State, Eric Pickles, who rejected the previous application, a year earlier. On 19 June 2014 it was reported that Pinewood Studios had received approval to go ahead with the multimillion-pound expansion plans which would see it rival Hollywood film sets.

== Enter the Pitch ==
Pinewood Studios is one of the sponsors for the short film competition "Enter the Pitch," also known as the Pitch, which launched in 2009. The Pitch is an online short film pitching competition that invites film makers to submit a project that takes inspiration from any story, character, or theme in the Bible. The top ten finalists are invited to Pinewood Studios, where they pitch their film to a panel of industry professionals. The person giving the best pitch wins an apprenticeship with industry professionals and is mentored on how to turn their pitch into a short film.

The inaugural Pitch winner was Simeon Lumgair's Derelict (2009); the most recent as of 2020 was Oneikeh Campbell's Five Thousand Stars (2020).

== See also ==
- List of productions filmed at Pinewood Group facilities
- Pinewood Group
- Shepperton Studios
