= Lauren Brant =

South African-Australian television personality, singer, dancer and actress (born 1989)

Lauren Brant Hall
- Brant in 2012
- Born: Lauren Marie Brant; 24 February 1989 (age 37); Bloemfontein, South Africa
- Occupations: Television personality, actress, singer, dancer
- Years active: 2007–present
- Spouse: Barry Hall (m. 2021)
- Children: 4

Lauren Marie Brant Hall (born 24 February 1989) is a South African-Australian television personality, singer, dancer and actress. Brant was a member of the Australian children's musical group Hi-5 from 2009 to 2014.

== Early life ==
Brant was born in South Africa. She moved with her family to Australia's Gold Coast shortly after birth. She began singing, dancing, acting and modelling at the age of three.

== Career ==
Brant began her career as an actress with various roles in Australian television. In 2007, Brant appeared on H_{2}O: Just Add Water. She also featured on The Strip, Mortified, The Starter Wife and Are We There Yet? She also featured in various theatre productions and the travelling Humphrey Bear show in 2007.

Brant joined the Australian children's musical group Hi-5 in 2009 along with Fely Irvine and Tim Maddren, the trio joining Stevie Nicholson and Casey Burgess, forming the line-up known as the "second generation" of the group. Brant remained with Hi-5 for five and a half years, until her final performances with the group in July 2014 on an Australian tour, in which the cast wore costumes she designed under her new fashion label, Loliboli. She was replaced by Tanika Anderson. Brant stated she had "the most amazing journey".

Brant appeared as a contestant in the Australian reality series I'm a Celebrity...Get Me Out of Here! in January 2015. She was eliminated from the competition in February, becoming the fourth contestant to be eliminated. Brant became known for "speaking her mind" and spoke of the intensity of the competition upon elimination.

In March 2015, Brant was announced as part of the cast of Bonnie Lythgoe's pantomime production of Aladdin and His Wondrous Lamp, playing Princess Yasmina. The stage production ran during July in Sydney.

== Philanthropy ==
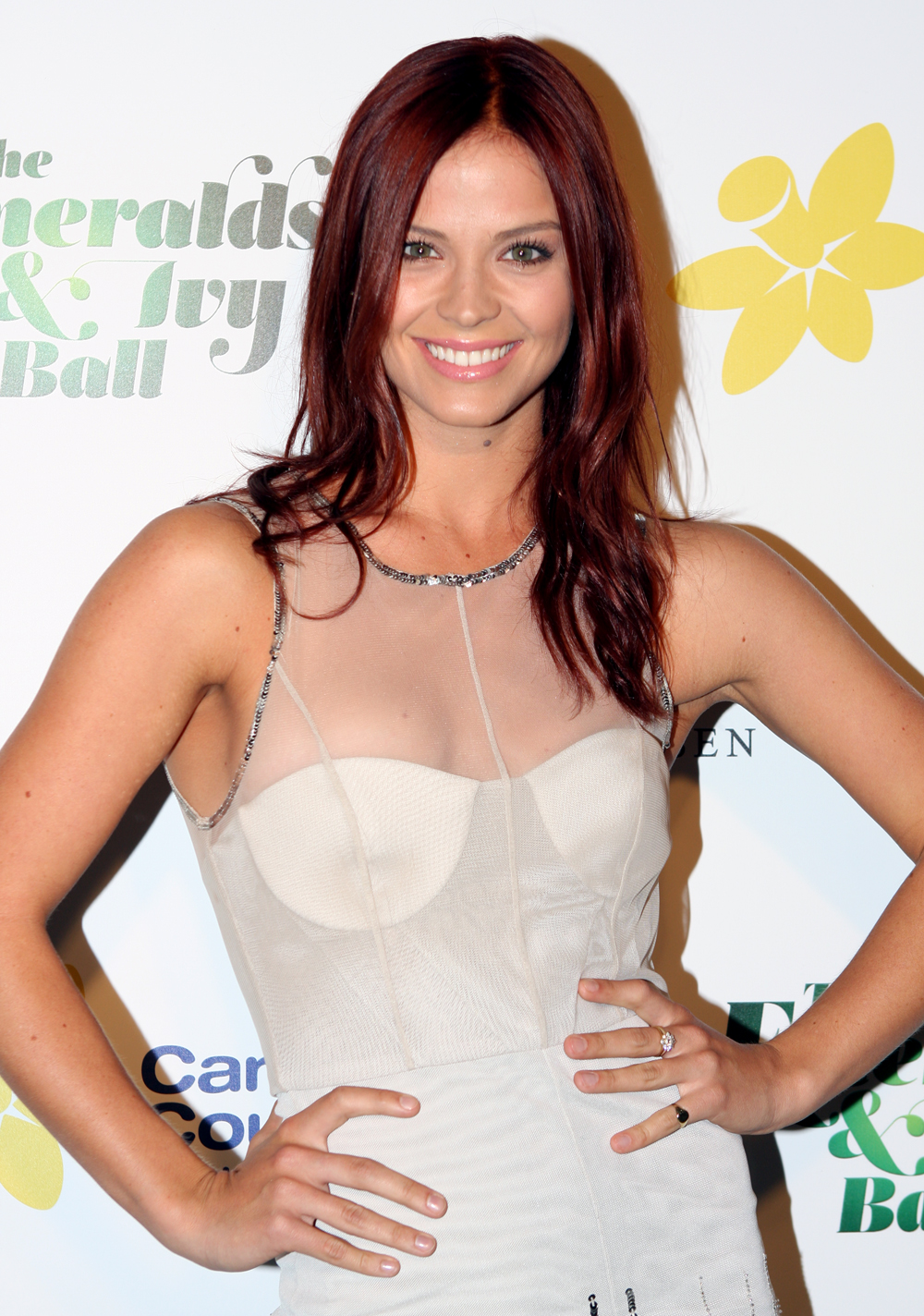
Brant in 2012

Brant is an ambassador for the McGrath Foundation.

== Personal life ==
Brant has an interest in fitness.

Brant moved back to the Gold Coast in 2014 after spending six years living in Sydney as part of her role in Hi-5.

In September 2015, Woman's Day reported that Brant had allegedly had an affair with ex-NRL player Beau Ryan while they were working on the stage production of Aladdin and His Wondrous Lamp in July. Her then fiancé, Warren Riley, had discovered an exchange of text messages between the pair.

Brant met former Australian rules footballer Barry Hall while filming I'm a Celebrity...Get Me Out of Here! in South Africa in 2015. The pair confirmed they were dating in November 2016. In May 2017 Brant and her partner Hall announced the birth of their baby boy, Miller Hall. The two secretly got married on 17 February 2021 (a week before Brant's birthday). The pair have since had three more sons: Houston (born May 2019), Samson (born October 2021) and Clay (born July 2024) .

== Filmography ==
Film roles
| Year | Title | Role |
|---|---|---|
| 2013 | Hi-5 Some Kind of Wonderful | Presenter |

Television roles
| Year | Title | Role | Notes |
|---|---|---|---|
| 2007 | H_{2}O: Just Add Water | Staff Member | 2.14: "Get Off My Tail" |
| 2008 | The Strip | Hannah | 1.5: "Weight Loss Queen" |
| 2009–11 | Hi-5 | Presenter | Series 11 to 13 |
| 2013 | Hi-5 House | Presenter | Series 1 |
| 2015 | I'm a Celebrity...Get Me Out of Here! | Contestant | Series 1, Fourth contestant eliminated |
