= Pinewood Group =

Film and television studio company

Pinewood Group Limited
- Company type: Private
- Traded as: LSE: PWS
- Industry: Film Television
- Founded: 2001; 25 years ago
- Headquarters: Iver Heath, Buckinghamshire, United Kingdom
- Key people: Paul Golding (chairman & Interim CEO)
- Revenue: £64.06 million (2014)
- Operating income: £4.88 million (2014)
- Net income: £5.35 million (2014)
- Total assets: £155.57 million (at 31 December 2014)
- Total equity: £84.71 million (at 31 December 2014)
- Owner: Aermont Capital (65.19%); Aviva (14.14%); Crystal Amber Fund (5.65%); Isle of Man Treasury (3.57%)
- Subsidiaries: List: Pinewood Studios Shepperton Studios Teddington Studios Pinewood Toronto Studios Pinewood Atlanta Studios Pinewood Dominican Republic Studios Pinewood Studio Berlin Pinewood Iskandar Malaysia Studios
- Website: pinewoodgroup.com

Pinewood Group Limited (formerly Pinewood Group plc and Pinewood Shepperton plc) is a British multinational film studio and television studio company with headquarters in Iver Heath, Buckinghamshire, England. The group runs Pinewood Studios and Shepperton Studios in the UK and Pinewood Toronto Studios in Canada, Pinewood Dominican Republic Studios in the Dominican Republic, Pinewood Studio Berlin in Germany, Pinewood Iskandar Malaysia Studios in Malaysia, and until 2020 it had a controlling stake in Pinewood Atlanta Studios in the US.

To date, over 1,500 productions have used facilities or services provided by Pinewood Group.

== History ==
=== Formation and expansion ===
The Pinewood Studios Group was formed by merger of Pinewood and Shepperton Studios at the start of the new millennium. The company floated on the London Stock Exchange in 2004 as Pinewood Shepperton Plc. In 2005, Teddington Studios was purchased by the Group.

A period of rapid international expansion began in 2009 when The Pinewood Studios Group took over sales and marketing of what was then Filmport (now Pinewood Toronto Studios). Then within three months, three new ventures were announced, two being completely new studio complexes. The first was Pinewood Iskandar Malaysia Studios in partnership with Khazanah Nasional Berhad (the investment holding arm of the Government of Malaysia). Next came the announcement of Pinewood Studio Berlin. Then in February 2011 the company announced that it was planning to open a 35-acre film and television studio in the Dominican Republic.

Later in 2011, The Peel Group acquired a controlling 71% interest in the company for £96 million.

=== Project Pinewood ===
In November 2007, Pinewood announced a £200m expansion plan, known as Project Pinewood. When built the development will see replicas of streetscapes and zones replicating locations from the UK, Europe and the USA. Planned zones include a college campus, Amsterdam, modern European housing, Venice, Lake Como, Paris, an Amphitheatre, Prague, West coast American housing, warehousing and downtown New York sets, Chicago, Vienna, a castle, a UK canal, Chinatown and a London street market built. In addition it will also be used as residential housing, with the proposed creative community, expected to be in the region of 2000 and 2250, being integrated with the film locations. Job creation is also a key part of the plan, helping to boost the economy of both the region and the nation as a whole.

An application for planning permission was formally submitted in June 2009. However, the planning application was rejected by South Bucks District Council in October 2009, following a prolonged opposition campaign by local residents, who formed a "Stop Project Pinewood" group. Pinewood have since appealed the decision and a public inquiry commenced on 5 April 2011. In June 2014 Pinewood won its appeal and began developing the expansion.

=== Recent developments ===
In February 2015, the name of the company changed from Pinewood Shepperton plc to Pinewood Group plc.

In June 2015, The Peel Group reduced its stake in the company to 39%.

In February 2016, the group confirmed it was considering options for its business, including a possible sale. In July 2016, its two largest shareholders, Goodweather Investment Management owned by The Peel Group and Warren James Holdings agreed to sell their respective holdings to Aermont Capital. Pinewood agreed to the £323 million deal in August 2016, which would take the group private. The sale was completed on 4 October 2016, and the company delisted from the London Stock Exchange the following day.

== Operations ==
=== United Kingdom ===
==== Pinewood Studios ====
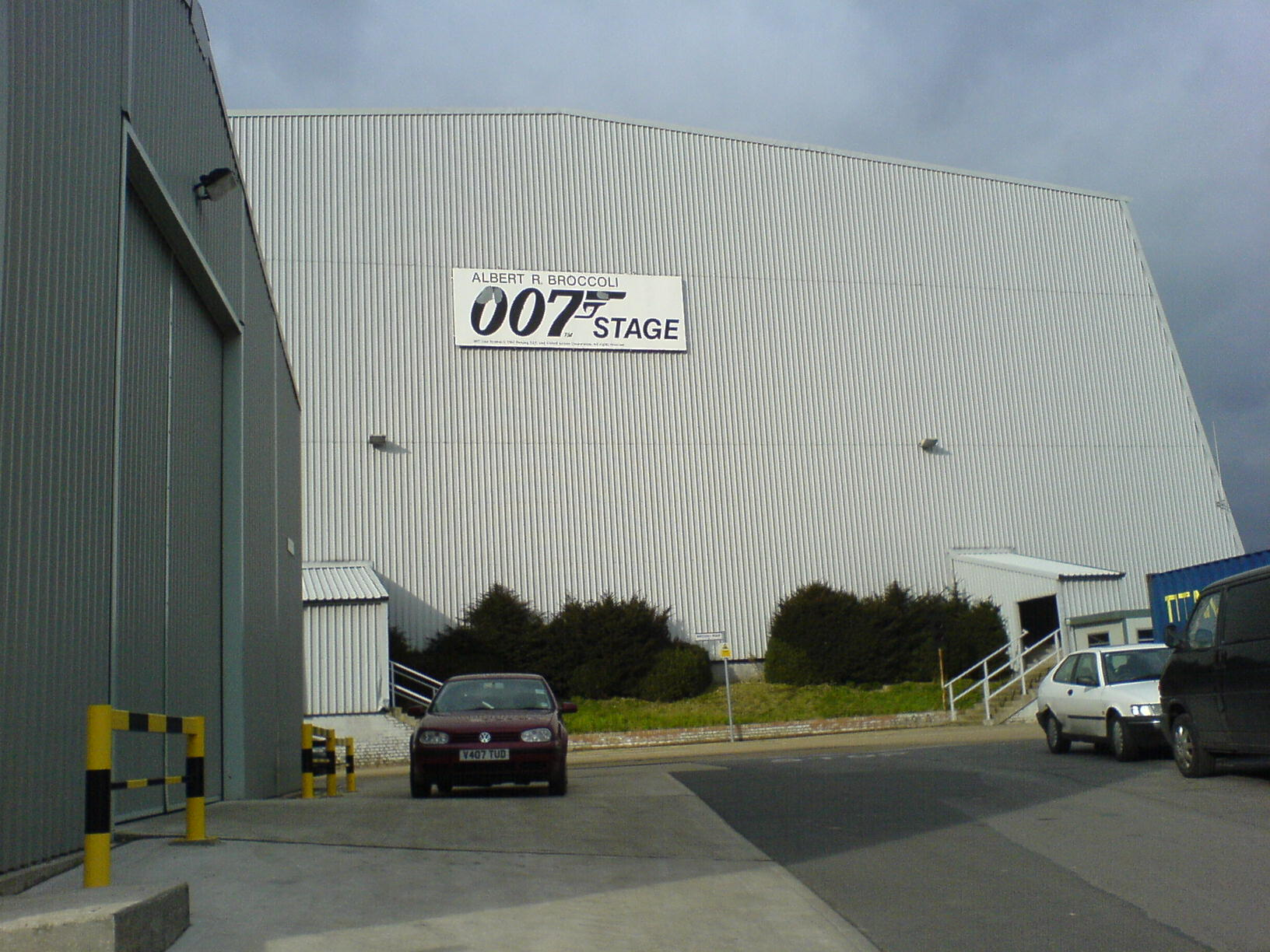
The 007 Stage at Pinewood Studios in 2006, prior to rebuilding.

Pinewood Studios is well-known for its connection with the James Bond film series. It has been the home for many other productions over the years, large and small. With a total of seventeen stages (including the 007 Stage, Underwater Stage and TV studios), Pinewood is the UK's largest and most prolific studio.

==== Pinewood Studio Wales ====
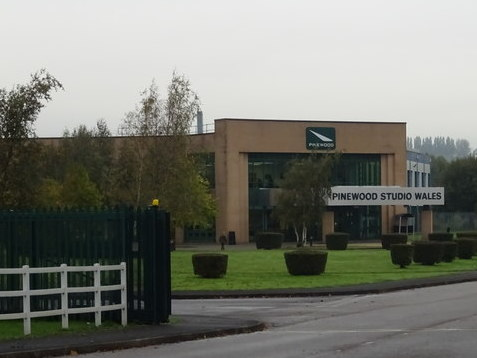
Pinewood Studio Wales, Cardiff

Pinewood Studio Wales opened in north-east Cardiff in January 2015. Television series The Bastard Executioner, Sherlock and A Discovery of Witches have been filmed there.

In October 2019, Pinewood announced its intention to terminate its lease and management agreement with the Welsh government in March 2020. The studio complex was rebranded as Seren Stiwdios and was acquired by Great Point in October 2020.

==== Shepperton Studios ====
Shepperton Studios is often described as the home for independent filmmaking in the UK but it has also been used for the production of a number of blockbuster films including Captain America: The First Avenger, which used eight of the fifteen stages at Shepperton.

==== Teddington Studios ====
Teddington Studios was a specialist television studio complex on the banks of the River Thames. It had eight television studios ranging from 383 sq ft to 8,891 sq ft. The first UK sitcom to be shot in high definition, The Green Green Grass was filmed at Teddington Studios.

The studios closed in 2014 and the site cleared for residential redevelopment.

==== Pinewood Films ====
In 2011, The Pinewood Studios Group created Pinewood Films to help fund and provide facilities to independent British films with budgets of approximately £2 million. Pinewood Films would invest equity up to 20% per film with the intention to support four films each year.

The first film to receive funding is A Fantastic Fear of Everything starring Simon Pegg. The film was shot at Shepperton Studios.

=== Elsewhere ===
==== Pinewood Toronto Studios ====
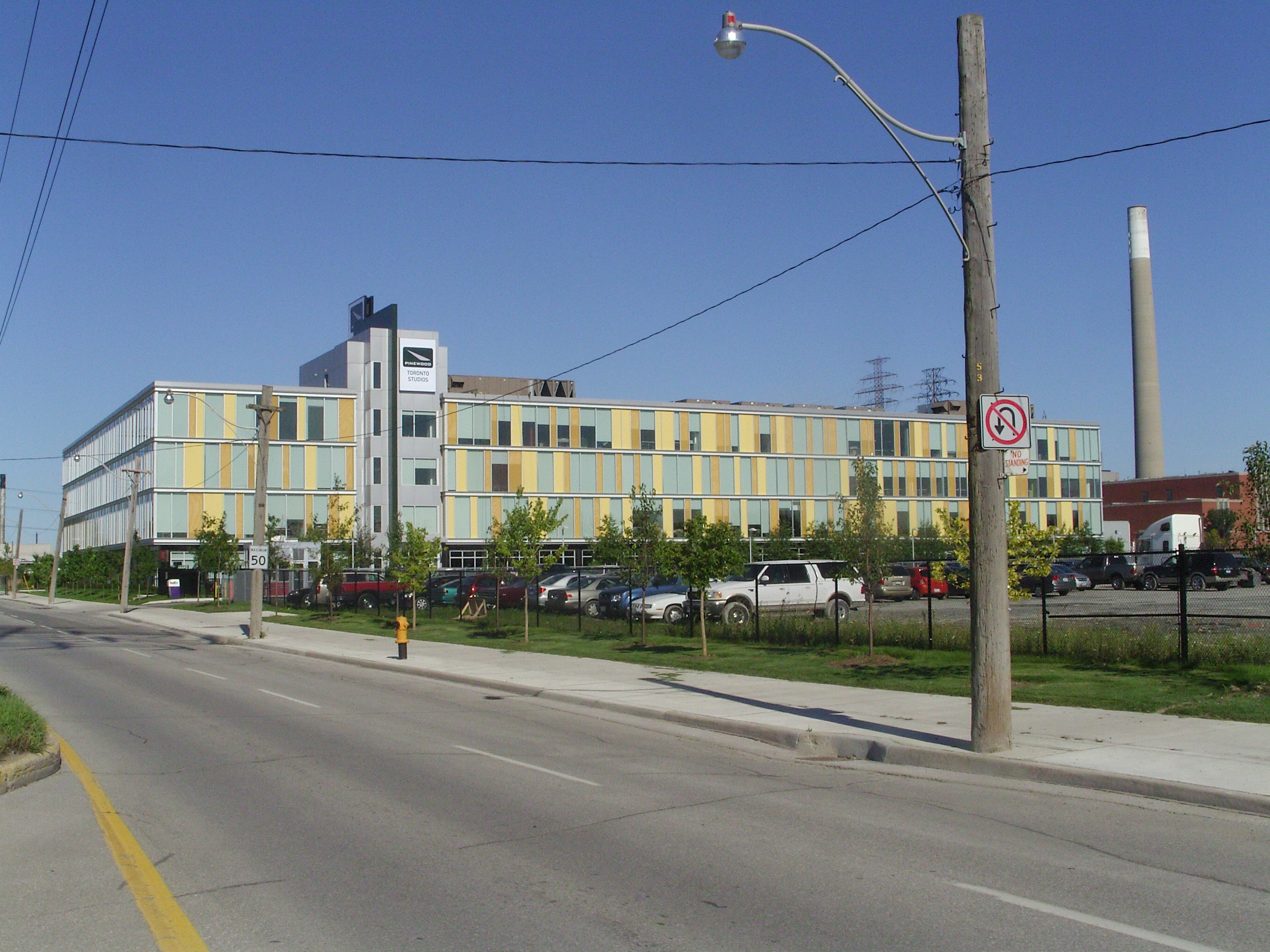
Pinewood Toronto Studios

Pinewood Toronto Studios is a major film and television studio complex in Toronto. The 11-acre site has over 250,000 sq ft of production space, comprising eight stages including North America's largest purpose-built soundstage.

==== Pinewood Dominican Republic Studios ====
Pinewood Dominican Republic Studios is a state-of-the-art studio facility located in the southern coast of the Dominican Republic. It is operated with direct management and supervision from the Pinewood Studios Group. It is a modern production facility that offers full-service capabilities for film, TV, and related media content, including the largest and most advanced water filming facility in the world.

In May 2024, Pinewood Group sold its minority stake in the operation to Lantica Media - the complex was subsequently renamed to Lantica Studios, with the new owners announcing an expansion of the complex, including a fourth soundstage.

==== Pinewood Studio Berlin ====
Pinewood Studio Berlin is a partnership between The Pinewood Studios Group and Studio Hamburg. The joint venture provides film production services and first class film and TV stages (ranging from 6,481 sq ft to 25,900 sq ft) to European and international filmmakers, making it easier to take advantage of the benefits of filming in Germany.

==== Pinewood Iskandar Malaysia Studios ====
Opened in June 2014, Pinewood Iskandar Malaysia Studios includes 100,000 sq ft of film stages, 24,000 sq ft of TV studios as well as offices, workshops and post production facilities.

In June 2019, Pinewood Group ended its involvement with the studios - the complex subsequently being renamed to Iskandar Malaysia Studios.

==== Pinewood Atlanta Studios / Trilith Studios ====
Located in Fayetteville, Georgia in south-southwestern metro Atlanta.

In October 2020, it was announced Pinewood Group sold its stake in the studios to Chick-fil-A CEO and businessman Dan Cathy. The Atlanta studio was subsequently re-branded as Trilith Studios. Ongoing development phases were also announced, expected to bring 7,000 jobs to the state of Georgia. Trilith Studios is currently the second-largest film and television studio in North America.

==== Los Angeles sales office ====
The Pinewood Studios Group has a US-based sales office located at Sony Pictures Studio in Culver City, Los Angeles.
