= Hi-5 discography =

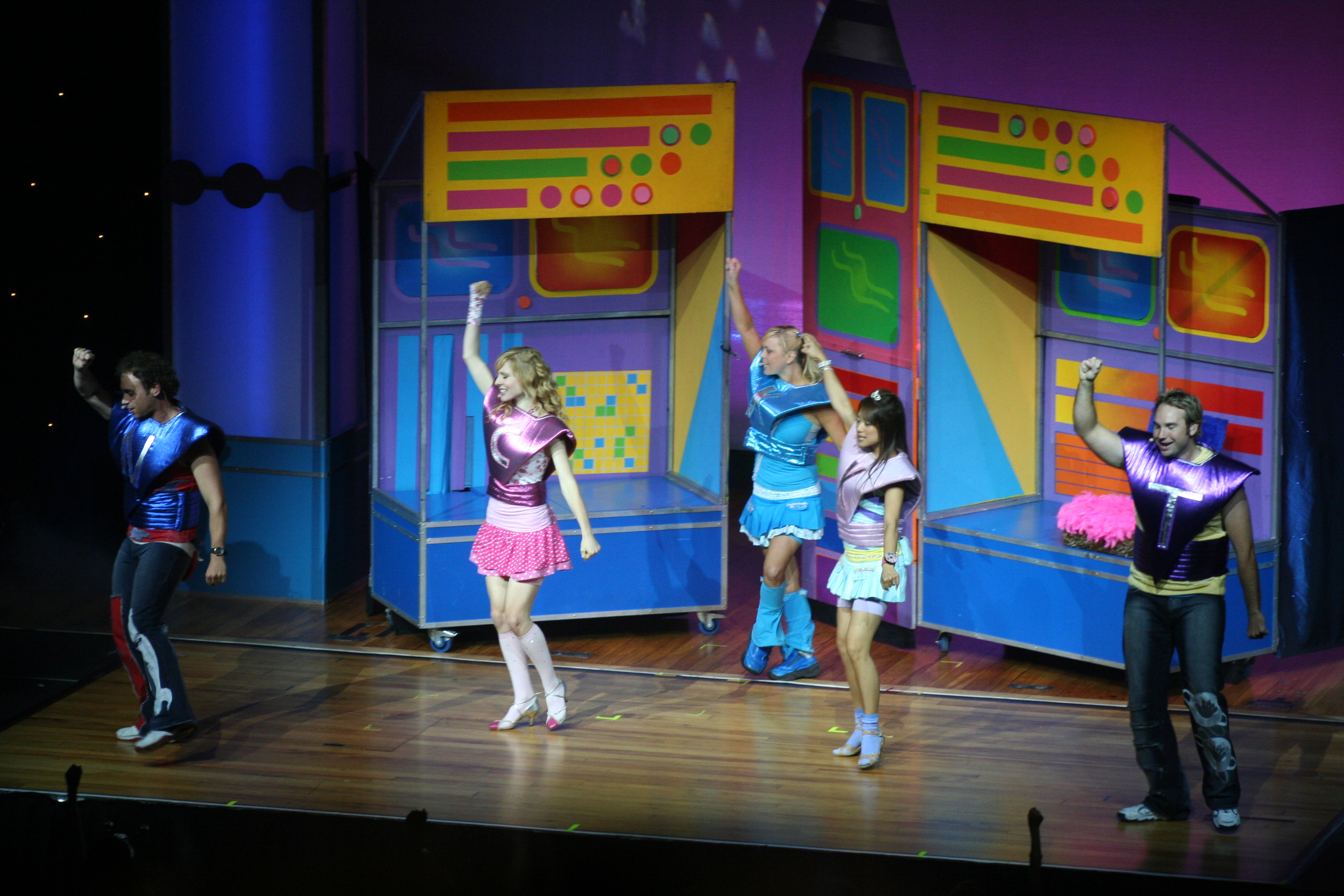
- The original members performing in Wellington, New Zealand in 2006 (L–R: Nathan Foley, Charli Robinson, Kellie Crawford, Kathleen de Leon Jones, and Tim Harding)
- Studio albums: 15
- Compilation albums: 3
- Singles: 3
- Reissues: 2

Australian children's musical group Hi-5 released fifteen studio albums, three compilation albums, two reissues, and three singles. Five of the group's albums were certified by the Australian Recording Industry Association (ARIA) as gold, platinum and double platinum. Four of their albums reached the top 10 on the ARIA Albums Chart.

The original line-up's debut studio album, Jump and Jive with Hi-5 (1999), charted at number 33 in Australia in December 1999, and was accredited as platinum in 2000. The quintet's first single, "Santa Claus Is Coming" (1999), reached number 52 on the singles chart when it was re-released in 2000. Their second studio album, It's a Party (2000) was the first release to reach the top ten, charting at number four in July 2000. It was certified double platinum in 2001 and was their only release to do so. Boom Boom Beat (2001), Hi-5's third studio album, peaked at number three in August 2001 and was certified as platinum.

It's a Hi-5 Christmas (2001) reached number four on the ARIA albums chart in December 2001 and was accredited as platinum. Hi-5 received a gold certification for their fifth studio album, Celebrate (2002). The group's first greatest hits compilation, Hi-5 Hits (2003), reached number ten in July 2003. By 2004, the group had received five consecutive ARIA Music Awards in the same category, Best Children's Album, which was a record at the time. It's a Hi-5 Christmas and Jingle Jangle Jingle with Hi-5 (2004) returned to the charts in 2009, debuting on the ARIA Catalogue Albums Chart in November and December respectively. The former peaked at number three in December 2012 and the latter reached number five in the same month.

== Albums ==
=== Studio albums ===
List of studio albums, with selected chart positions and certifications
Title	Album details	Peak chart position			Certifications	Sales
Title	Album details	AUS	NZL	UK	Certifications	Sales
Jump and Jive with Hi-5	Released: 24 September 1999; Label: Sony; Formats: CD, cassette	33	23	—	ARIA: Platinum	
It's a Party	Released: 14 July 2000; Label: Sony; Formats: CD, cassette	4	—	—	ARIA: 2× Platinum	
Boom Boom Beat	Released: 23 July 2001; Label: Sony; Formats: CD, cassette	3	27	92 (Note: Boom Boom Beat was released in the UK on 15 September 2003, and charted in February 2004.)	ARIA: Platinum	UK: 50,000
It's a Hi-5 Christmas	Released: 23 November 2001; Label: Sony; Formats: CD, cassette	4 (Note: It's a Hi-5 Christmas also debuted on the Catalogue Albums Chart in November 2009, and peaked at number three in December 2012.)	—	—	ARIA: Platinum	
Celebrate	Released: 14 October 2002; Label: Sony; Formats: CD, cassette	27	—	—	ARIA: Gold	
Hi-5 Holiday	Released: 19 September 2003; Label: Sony; Formats: CD, cassette	37 (Note: Hi-5 Holiday peaked at number 37 in October 2003. The re-issued album peaked at number 26 in April 2004.)	—	—		
Jingle Jangle Jingle with Hi-5	Released: 9 October 2004; Label: Sony; Formats: CD, cassette	55 (Note: Jingle Jangle Jingle with Hi-5 also debuted on the Catalogue Albums Chart in December 2009, and peaked at number five in December 2012.)	—	—		
Making Music	Released: 23 May 2005; Label: Sony; Formats: CD	61	—	—		
Wish Upon a Star	Released: 17 June 2006; Label: Sony; Formats: CD	29	—	—		
Wow!	Released: 30 June 2007; Label: Sony; Formats: CD	30	—	—		
Planet Earth	Released: 19 July 2008; Label: Sony; Formats: CD	—	—	—		
Spin Me Round	Released: 9 October 2009; Label: Sony; Formats: CD, digital download	—	—	—		
Turn the Music Up!	Released: 1 October 2010; Label: Sony; Formats: CD, digital download	—	—	—		
Sing It Loud	Released: 11 November 2011; Label: Sony; Formats: CD, digital download	—	—	—		
Hi-5 Hot Hits!	Released: 10 October 2014; Label: Sony; Formats: Digital download	—	—	—		
"—" denotes items which were not released in that country or failed to chart.

=== Compilation albums ===
List of compilation albums, with selected chart positions
Title	Album details	Peak chart position AUS
Hi-5 Hits	Released: 27 June 2003; Label: Sony; Formats: CD, cassette	10
All the Best	Released: 4 October 2008; Label: Sony; Formats: CD	—
Best of Hi-5	Released: 11 February 2015; Label: Sony; Formats: Digital download	—
"—" denotes items which were not released in that country or failed to chart.

=== Reissues ===
List of reissued albums, with selected chart positions
Title	Album details	Peak chart position AUS
Hi-5 Holiday: Hear It, See It	Released: 5 April 2004; Label: Sony; Formats: CD/DVD	26
Hi-5 House Party (Note: Hi-5 House Party was released as a reissue of Hi-5 Hot Hits! under a new title with additional tracks.)	Released: 21 May 2019; Label: Sony; Format: Digital download	—

== Singles ==
List of singles, with selected chart positions
Title	Details	Peak chart position AUS	Album
"Santa Claus Is Coming"	Released: 1999; Label: Sony; Formats: CD	52 (Note: "Santa Claus Is Coming" was re-released in 2000; it peaked at number 52 and remained in the top 100 for seven weeks.)	It's a Hi-5 Christmas
"Santa Claus Is Coming"	Released: 6 December 2013; Label: Myer Community Fund; Formats: Digital download	—	
"Santa Claus Is Coming!"	Released: 21 December 2016; Label: Hi-5 World; Formats: Digital download	—	
"—" denotes items which were not released in that country or failed to chart.
