= Hi-5 (2017 TV series) series 1 =

Hi-5
- Series 1 (2017 Revival)
- Starring: Courtney Clarke; Shay Clifford; Lachie Dearing; Joe Kalou; Bailey Spalding
- No. of episodes: 25

Release
- Original network: 9Go!
- Original release: 15 May – 16 June 2017

Season chronology
- ← Previous; Hi-5 House Series 3

The first series of the 2017 Hi-5 revival (also referred to as Series 17) aired between 15 May 2017 and 16 June 2017 on 9Go! in Australia. The series was produced independently with Julie Greene as executive producer.

The series began production after the Nine Network renewed its partnership with the Hi-5 franchise in October 2016. This was the only series to feature an entirely new cast, introducing Courtney Clarke, Shay Clifford, Lachie Dearing, Joe Kalou, and Bailey Spalding.

== Production ==
The original Hi-5 television series aired its final series in 2011, as a result of the Nine Network selling the Hi-5 brand in 2012, following Nine's reported financial difficulties. The franchise was sold to Asian equity group, Asiasons (later Tremendous Entertainment Group), who produced a new television series entitled Hi-5 House, from 2013 to 2016, with no involvement from Nine.

On 14 October 2016, it was announced that the Nine Network had renewed its partnership with the Hi-5 franchise, revealing plans to revive the television series with an entirely new cast in 2017. The new series would feature a new cast and set, but retain the original team of producers and writers. Julie Greene, who had previously been a series producer of the original series, was announced as the executive producer of the revival. Greene became the brand's executive creative director in 2012 and was the executive producer for Hi-5 House. She stated "we're really excited to be working with Nine to develop a reinvigorated Hi-5 show". Auditions for the cast were held in November 2016, and the successful auditionees were revealed in December. Courtney Clarke, Shay Clifford, Joe Kalou, and Bailey Spalding were announced to be joining Lachie Dearing to form the next generation Hi-5 group, chosen from over 450 applications. Dearing had previously joined the group in January 2016, and had to re-audition for his role. The quintet made their public debut at Carols by Candlelight on Christmas Eve.

The revival began production in January 2017 and was filmed at Pinewood Iskandar Malaysia Studios over six weeks. The series premiered on Nine's multichannel, 9Go!, on 15 May, airing at 9:00 AM weekdays. The premiere run averaged a viewership of 10,000. The series was released on online streaming service Stan on 1 October 2017.

Four of the five feature songs ("Abracadabra", "Stop and Go", "Living in a Rainbow", and "Party Street"), were previously featured throughout the show's original run. The fifth song, "Hi-5 Dance Off", made its debut in the new episodes. The series also featured new puppet characters, the Jupsters, who were introduced as the family of previously established character Jup Jup. The revival also retained a segment introduced in Hi-5 House, entitled The Chatterbox. This segment focuses on the discovery of language through simple words and phrases, and features the puppet Chatterbox, who teaches a toy robot named Tinka how to speak.

A second revived series was planned for 2018, with 45 episodes ordered by Nine. Production of the series halted before the Australian production office was closed, and filming did not resume. The five cast members later announced their departures from the group.

== Cast ==
=== Presenters ===
- Courtney Clarke – Word Play
- Shay Clifford – Puzzles and Patterns
- Lachie Dearing – Shapes in Space
- Joe Kalou – Making Music
- Bailey Spalding – Body Move

== Episodes ==
No. overall	No. in series	Title	Song of the Week	Theme	Original release date
571	1	"Making Music"	Hi-5 Dance Off	Music and Dance	15 May 2017
Joe pretends to be a whistling canary who tries to find a new whistle sound. Shay practises playing the guitar so she can play in a band. Bailey conducts an imaginary orchestra. Courtney and Chats write a pop song about things that pop. Bailey does a popping popcorn dance. Lachie runs a musical barbershop and gives his customers some hairstyles of different shapes. Bailey uses imaginary scissors to cut and style the hair of a woolly mammoth. Sharing Stories: Bailey tells a story about three African animals (Joe, Shay, and Courtney) who are preparing for a dance festival, and are joined by a new member; an Australian kangaroo (Lachie) who helps them prepare for the performance.
572	2	"Ballet, Tap, and Jazz"	Hi-5 Dance Off	Music and Dance	16 May 2017
Courtney and Chats practise dancing ballet and think of silly new names to describe the movements. Bailey pretends to be a tap dancing tarantula. Lachie assembles a life-sized music box and asks Shay to act as the ballerina doll dancing inside. Bailey performs a ballet dance featuring circular movements. Joe makes music with gardening equipment while working outside. Shay does some tap dancing, before Jup Jup helps her change her moves to an old-time jazz style. Bailey uses her fingers as dancing puppets in a tiny ballet. The Chatterbox: Chats and the bookworms teach Tinka how to dance fast and slow, and imagine performing the moves on stage at a concert.
573	3	"World Dance & Music"	Hi-5 Dance Off	Music and Dance	17 May 2017
Shay sets up a store selling shoes for different kinds of dance from around the world. Bailey dances with bare feet. Lachie, Samba Man, does the samba dance from Brazil. Bailey dances the tango with a teddy bear. Joe tries to find an instrument to play at a German folk music festival. Courtney teaches Chats words from the Zulu language of Africa. Bailey dresses up as a gorilla for a jungle dance. Sharing Stories: Bailey tells a story about three African animals (Joe, Shay, and Courtney) who are preparing for a dance festival, and are joined by a new member; an Australian kangaroo (Lachie) who helps them prepare for the performance.
574	4	"Hip Hop"	Hi-5 Dance Off	Music and Dance	18 May 2017
Lachie spells "hip hop" and makes the shapes of the letters with his body. Bailey pretends to be a hippo wiping the mud off her shoes with a hip hop dance. Courtney and Chats write a rap to go with their hip hop dance moves. Bailey does some hip hop dance moves. Joe learns to beatbox by using some ordinary words as inspiration for the sounds. Shay finds some fancy jewellery and uses it to create a clock costume for hip hop dancing. Bailey and the rest of Hi-5 have a hip hop dance competition. The Chatterbox: Chats and the bookworms teach Tinka how to dance fast and slow, and imagine performing the moves on stage at a concert.
575	5	"Rock and Roll"	Hi-5 Dance Off	Music and Dance	19 May 2017
Lachie visits a guitar workshop and makes a new guitar with his old skateboard. Bailey stomps the recycling flat while singing rock and roll music. Shay records a rock song using her tablet. Bailey plays the drums. Joe the musical robot uses electro-rock music to re-energise his robot friends. Courtney and Chats dress up as rock and roll rabbits, roosters, and a reindeer. Bailey the rock and roll rat does a jive. Sharing Stories: Bailey tells a story about three African animals (Joe, Shay, and Courtney) who are preparing for a dance festival, and are joined by a new member; an Australian kangaroo (Lachie) who helps them prepare for the performance.
576	6	"Fantasy Fun"	Abracadabra	Dream Wishes	22 May 2017
Lachie imagines a world of circles where everything is made of round shapes. Bailey pretends to be a roly-poly bug who rolls and bounces. Shay makes fairy bread in the hope of meeting a fairy. Pirate Joe and his crew set sail rowing across the ocean in search of musical treasure. Bailey sends a cork dressed as a pirate on a sailing adventure. Courtney and Chats visit an aquarium in their imagination. Bailey pretends to be a little fish and a big fish. Sharing Stories: Lachie tells a story about a girl (Courtney) who finds a golden whistle, and summons three magic genies (Shay, Bailey, and Joe) who grant her three wishes.
577	7	"Imaginary Adventures"	Abracadabra	Dream Wishes	23 May 2017
Lachie goes on an African safari and discovers different animals along the way. Bailey the elephant cools off with some water. Joe imagines visiting the Land of the Brass Blowers, where they speak using brass instruments. Shay digs and searches for treasure using picture messages on stones, like in Ancient Egypt. Bailey puts on hats for different jobs and performs the associated action of each occupation. Courtney and Chats paddle a canoe in search of a crocodile. Bailey pretends to paddle into crocodile country. The Chatterbox: Tinka learns what a holiday is when Chats travels to the beach, the bookworms visit the snow, and Tinka holidays to the jungle.
578	8	"Wishing"	Abracadabra	Dream Wishes	24 May 2017
Shay makes a snowman without using snow, using rocks to build a "rockman". Bailey does a winter warm-up. Lachie pretends to be an astronaut landing on the Moon and playing a space ball game with a Moon creature. Bailey pretends to be a space traveller walking on the Moon. Joe sings a magical song while playing the flute in the forest, and attracts a phoenix and a dragon. Bailey pretends to be a magical bush creature. Courtney helps Chats become a racing car driver using a cardboard box as her racing car. Sharing Stories: Lachie tells a story about a girl (Courtney) who finds a golden whistle, and summons three magic genies (Shay, Bailey, and Joe) who grant her three wishes.
579	9	"Big Dreams"	Abracadabra	Dream Wishes	25 May 2017
Joe imagines being the conductor of an orchestra, with the others imagining being singing stars of other music styles. Courtney and Chats imagine going on holiday to a destination where the beach and the snow exist together. Bailey fantasises about going to the bush for her next holiday. Lachie imagines being a superhero with the power of ironing clothes, who decides to flatten some mountains. Bailey practises her superhero moves. Shay tells a bedtime story to two babies at a daycare for fairies. Bailey sings about diamond stars. The Chatterbox: Tinka learns what a holiday is when Chats travels to the beach, the bookworms visit the snow, and Tinka holidays to the jungle.
580	10	"Magic in Me"	Abracadabra	Dream Wishes	26 May 2017
Lachie becomes a magician, creating different shapes using everyday objects. Bailey makes animal shadows using her hands. Courtney and Chats brighten up their day with a magical lamp which produces colourful light. Bailey practises her magical genie movements. Joe uses symbols to help Courtney and Lachie write down the music playing through their minds, before they play the song on their imaginary instruments. Shay tries to perform a magic hat-trick and make a rabbit appear from inside her empty top hat. Bailey finds a real rabbit inside a magician's top hat. Sharing Stories: Lachie tells a story about a girl (Courtney) who finds a golden whistle, and summons three magic genies (Shay, Bailey, and Joe) who grant her three wishes.
581	11	"Saving Energy / Natural Energy"	Stop and Go	Energy	29 May 2017
Lachie explores how wind power makes sailing boats move. Bailey pretends to be a windmill spinning in the breeze. Joe explores the different types of energy needed to play musical instruments. Shay imagines being a butterfly using wing power to fly around. Bailey dresses up as a bee for a dance featuring bee movements. Courtney and Chats use stormy words and sounds to create a powerful storm performance. Bailey practises moving like a lightning bolt. Sharing Stories: Joe tells a story about four inventors (Bailey, Courtney, Shay, and Lachie) who each create a machine that uses natural energy, before combining the inventions together to create a super energy machine.
582	12	"How to Feel Energetic"	Stop and Go	Energy	30 May 2017
Courtney is feeling flat, so Chats gives her a pick-me-up as an energy coach. Bailey does some yoga stretches. Joe and his rock band try to find instruments to play which have a loud, energetic sound. Lachie cleans his space and turns his chores into a fun challenge. Bailey plays a game of bin basketball with the paper recycling. Shay waters the flowers in the backyard to give them energy, before Jup Jup gives her an energy workout of her own. Bailey gets the jiggles and tries to sit still. The Chatterbox: Chats and the bookworms teach Tinka about breakfast, leading Tinka to make an overabundance of toast for the group to eat.
583	13	"Science"	Stop and Go	Energy	31 May 2017
Shay performs an experiment, trying to discover which animal sound can be made with a cup. Bailey plays with slime. Nurse Courtney and Doctor Chats check in with their teddy bear patient. Bailey the nurse looks after her patients. Scientist Lachie conducts an experiment in his laboratory to find the best fizzy lava for his volcano. Bailey pretends to be a fizzy volcano. Joe makes musical chimes at a café with his drinking glasses. Sharing Stories: Joe tells a story about four inventors (Bailey, Courtney, Shay, and Lachie) who each create a machine that uses natural energy, before combining the inventions together to create a super energy machine.
584	14	"Inventions"	Stop and Go	Energy	1 June 2017
Courtney and Chats use a bicycle-powered blender to make an ABC smoothie. Bailey invents a dance with moves inspired by the fruit salad. Shay invents a new way to blow bubbles when she misplaces her bubble wand. Bailey blows bubbles and tries to pop them. Joe becomes a one man band and tries to find a way to carry all of his instruments at the same time. Lachie invents a balloon rocket, powered by the air of a deflating balloon. Bailey builds a rocket using three large boxes. The Chatterbox: Chats and the bookworms teach Tinka about breakfast, leading Tinka to make an overabundance of toast for the group to eat.
585	15	"Vehicles"	Stop and Go	Energy	2 June 2017
Courtney and Chats travel on a steam train powered by coal. Bailey pretends to be an old steam train and a new electric train. Lachie runs a service station for electric cars, powering them with energy from bouncing on a trampoline. Bailey rows an imaginary boat using wooden spoon oars. Joe writes a musical jingle while selling ice cream on his bicycle. Shay finds an outfit to wear to a natural power parade, dressing as something that creates energy. Bailey does a dance for the Sun and the Moon. Sharing Stories: Joe tells a story about four inventors (Bailey, Courtney, Shay, and Lachie) who each create a machine that uses natural energy, before combining the inventions together to create a super energy machine.
586	16	"Your World"	Living in a Rainbow	Colours	5 June 2017
Lachie paints a rainbow coloured spider web while dressed as a colourful spider. Bailey moves her body to create a kaleidoscope of patterns and colours. Courtney and Chats pretend to visit Planet Pumpkin, where everything starts with P. Bailey finds words that start with P. Joe works as a weather presenter and uses instruments to report the weather forecast. Shay arranges some flowers in a vase. Bailey makes potpourri by plucking dried rose petals. Sharing Stories: Courtney tells a story about a chameleon (Joe) who camouflages when he feels nervous, and his animal friends (Shay, Bailey, and Lachie), who try to help him feel better about his special feature.
587	17	"The World"	Living in a Rainbow	Colours	6 June 2017
Lachie hosts The Hungry Games, a game show where the aim is to match a dish of food to the country of its origin. Bailey prowls around like a hungry bear searching for food. Courtney shows Chats some red sand from the Australian desert. Bailey uses her beach towel to hop across the hot sand and get to the water. Joe watches his new musical flowers bloom; a pop music flower (Bailey), a blues flower (Lachie), and a marching music flower (Courtney). Shay makes a special picture of the world and its shapes from the grass to outer space. Bailey draws a circle and turns it into different things. The Chatterbox: Chats and the bookworms teach Tinka about body parts while dressing up in colourful costumes for a carnival.
588	18	"Making and Mixing"	Living in a Rainbow	Colours	7 June 2017
Shay has been invited to a mix-up costume party, and looks for an outfit to wear. Bailey mix-and-matches clothes from the dress-up box. Lachie experiments with coloured paint and tries mixing different colours. Bailey pretends to be a colourful butterfly. Joe mixes different coloured instruments together to make an orchestra of rainbow sounds. Courtney paints a picture of Chats in front of Uluru before the sky changes colour. Bailey paints using her fingers and hands. Sharing Stories: Courtney tells a story about a chameleon (Joe) who camouflages when he feels nervous, and his animal friends (Shay, Bailey, and Lachie), who try to help him feel better about his special feature.
589	19	"Favourites and Feelings"	Living in a Rainbow	Colours	8 June 2017
Lachie makes a tray of fruity ice cubes for Hi-5, in different shapes and colours. Bailey serves some imaginary frozen yoghurt cones from a cart. Courtney imagines being a colourful fairy who changes the colour of Chats's flowers to a rainbow mix. Bailey pretends to be a fairy sprinkling magic dust. Joe plays blues music to match his blue mood, and invents "greens music" for Lachie's green style. Shay makes a colourful patchwork blanket for her teddy bear. Bailey dances with her blanket. The Chatterbox: Chats and the bookworms teach Tinka about body parts while dressing up in colourful costumes for a carnival.
590	20	"Wonderful"	Living in a Rainbow	Colours	9 June 2017
Lachie puts on a pretend firework show using streamers. Bailey pretends to be a party sparkler. Shay gets ready for her little cousin's birthday with a colourful cake and candles. Bailey tries to jump up and touch a rainbow. Joe writes a song about a peacock (Lachie) using instruments which express its grand colours. Courtney and Chats get ready for sleep by looking at diamond stars in the night sky. Bailey pretends to be a silver star. Sharing Stories: Courtney tells a story about a chameleon (Joe) who camouflages when he feels nervous, and his animal friends (Shay, Bailey, and Lachie), who try to help him feel better about his special feature.
591	21	"Country Fair"	Party Street	Fairs and Festivals	12 June 2017
Lachie tries to find a pumpkin in his patch which is big enough for the pumpkin growing contest. Bailey dances to rock and roll music while dressed as a pumpkin. Joe pretends to be a dog preparing for a musical dog show by searching for an instrument to play. Courtney plays some of Chats's country fair carnival games. Bailey does a country square dance with Joe, Shay, and Lachie. Shay finds a way to display her jars of fruit jam to sell at the country fair. Bailey arranges a platter of fruit. Sharing Stories: Shay tells a story about a clown (Lachie) who can't find a clown skill for his act, leading his family (Bailey, Courtney, and Joe) to try and help him discover his special talent.
592	22	"Animal Fun"	Party Street	Fairs and Festivals	13 June 2017
Courtney and Chats dress up as a butterfly and bee for a bug-themed ball, and try to figure out where the ball will be held. Bailey pretends to be a dragonfly. Lachie practises moving around in a long Chinese dragon costume for a festival, with the help of Joe and Shay. Bailey performs a cheer for dragons. Joe pretends to be an owl conducting his orchestra of owl friends in preparation for a musical performance at the bird festival. Bailey wears two swan sock puppets on her hands and performs a dance. Shay makes some biscuits decorated as animals to sell at her local fair. The Chatterbox: Chats and the bookworms take Tinka on a surprise trip to the fun fair, where they ride on the attractions.
593	23	"Circus"	Party Street	Fairs and Festivals	14 June 2017
Courtney and Chats make up a story about a circus acrobat who balances on the high wire. Bailey balances like a circus acrobat. Shay pretends to be a circus clown who stands still to form surprising statue poses. Bailey gives herself a balancing challenge. Lachie tries to find the right set of bicycle wheels for his circus act. Bailey dresses up as a clown and juggles balloons in the air for her act. Joe finds different percussion sounds to accompany Hi-5's circus acts. Sharing Stories: Shay tells a story about a clown (Lachie) who can't find a clown skill for his act, leading his family (Bailey, Courtney, and Joe) to try and help him discover his special talent.
594	24	"Holidays"	Party Street	Fairs and Festivals	15 June 2017
Courtney and Chats holiday in Paris and meet a French mime artist, who tries to act out a message using body language. Bailey rides around the countryside of France on a bicycle. Lachie goes skiing down the mountains while on a holiday in the snow. Bailey plays in the snow and makes snowflake shapes with her hands. Shay packs her bags for a weekend holiday to a music festival. Joe meets some dancing dragons in the mountains of Tibet, after playing magical music upon a full moon. Bailey does a dragon dance. The Chatterbox: Chats and the bookworms take Tinka on a surprise trip to the fun fair, where they ride on their attractions.
595	25	"Cultural Festivals"	Party Street	Fairs and Festivals	16 June 2017
Lachie holds a festival of colours in the garden, like in India. Bailey celebrates nature's festivities by dancing with colourful ribbons. Joe practises for an air guitar competition in Finland. Shay paints a picture of pink Japanese cherry blossoms. Bailey does a fan dance with a Japanese cherry blossom fan. Courtney and Chats decorate their space with lanterns, like the festival of light in Thailand. Bailey pretends to be a shooting star powered by wishes. Sharing Stories: Shay tells a story about a clown (Lachie) who can't find a clown skill for his act, leading his family (Bailey, Courtney, and Joe) to try and help him discover his special talent.

== Awards and nominations ==
List of awards and nominations received by Hi-5 (2017 TV series, series 1)
Award	Year	Recipient(s) and nominee(s)	Category	Result	Ref.
Asian Television Awards	2017	Hi-5 (2017, series 1)	Best Preschool Programme	Nominated	
Asian Academy Creative Awards	2018	Hi-5 (2017, series 1) (for "Vehicles")	Best Children's Entertainment or Drama	Won	
Asian Academy Creative Awards	2018	Hi-5 (2017, series 1) (for "Cultural Festivals")	Best Preschool Programme	Won	
