= Trilith Studios =

Film studio in Fayetteville, Georgia

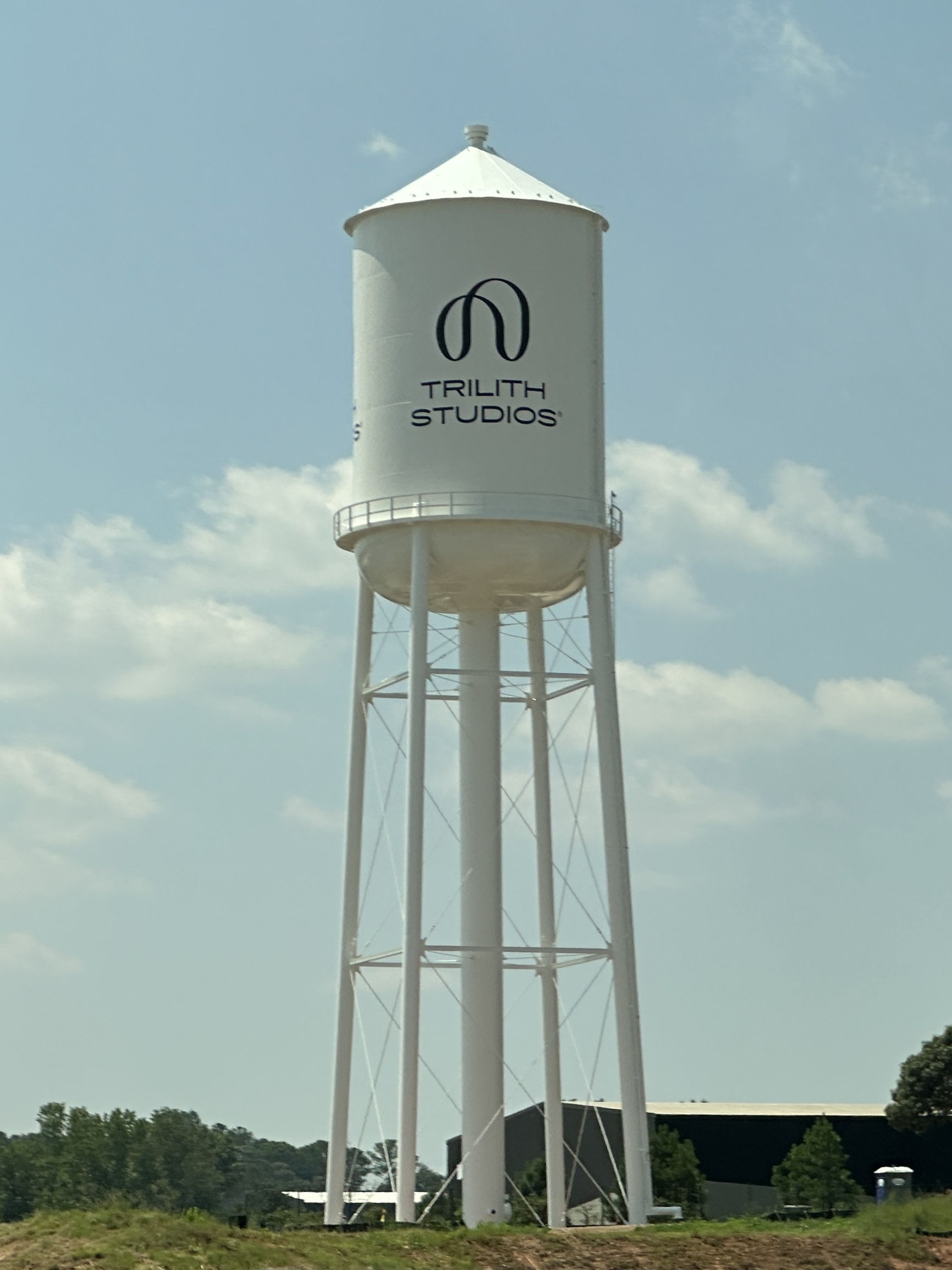
- Water tower at Trilith Studios

General information
- Location: 461 Sandy Creek Road; Fayetteville, Georgia 30214, United States
- Coordinates: 33.4724084°N 84.513209°W
- Owner: River's Rock, LLC (2013–present); Pinewood Group (2013–2020)

Website
- www.trilithstudios.com

Trilith Studios is an American film and television production studio located south of Atlanta in Fayette County, Georgia. Originally known as Pinewood Atlanta Studios, the studio has been used to produce many films and television programs, particularly those produced by Marvel Studios. Trilith Studios encompasses a 700-acre site, with a 400-acre backlot and 32 soundstages. A virtual production volume, Prysm Stage, opened in early 2022. As of 2024, Trilith Studios is the largest production facility in the state of Georgia and the largest outside of Hollywood.

== History ==
In 2009, Len Gough and Rick Halbert planned a film studio in Fayette County, Georgia. The next year, Gough and Halbert contacted Dan Cathy to expand a pre-existing studio at the Atlanta Regional Airport. Cathy did not accept the proposal until 2012, where he met the leaders of Pinewood Studios in London during the 2012 Olympic Games. When Pinewood leadership arrived at Fayette county, they preferred a 288-acre patch of farmland instead of the Atlanta Regional Airport.

The Pinewood Group announced in April 2013 that its first film production facility in the United States, Pinewood Atlanta Studios, would be located south of Atlanta at a complex consisting of 280 ha (690 acres) in Fayette County. The studio was a joint venture between Pinewood and River's Rock LLC, an independently managed trust of the Cathy family, founders of the Chick-fil-A fast-food chain. One of the earliest studios was built from an old airplane hangar owned by Cathy. Pinewood Atlanta would feature at least five sound stages. The Pinewood Group was attracted to Georgia for the studio because of the state's film tax credit.

The first production to film at the studio was Marvel Studios' film Ant-Man (2015), which began in September 2014. Marvel primarily shot their films at the facility for nearly a decade until 2025, where they changed their primary filming location to London. Notable Marvel films that were shot in the facility include Captain America: Civil War (2016), Spider-Man: Homecoming (2017), Black Panther (2018), Avengers: Infinity War (2018), Avengers: Endgame (2019), and Spider-Man: No Way Home (2021). In August 2019, Pinewood sold their shares of Pinewood Atlanta to River's Rock LLC, with Frank Patterson expected to remain to run the studio.

In October 2020, the studio was renamed Trilith Studios. Trilith was chosen as the studio's name as "a nod to our U.K. heritage” according to Patterson; its name originated from trilithon, an architectural term referring to a structure consisting of two large vertical stones supporting a third stone laid horizontally across the top such as the structures in Stonehenge. In November 2021, it was announced that Trilith, in collaboration with NEP Virtual Studios, would open the virtual production volume Prysm Stage facility in early 2022.

In August 2022, Trilith filed a proposal to add an additional 4.7 million sq. ft. of studio, production, office, warehouse, retail, and residential space south of the existing property by 2032. From 2022 to 2023, the 168 Film Project was held at the Trilith Town Stage. In October 2024, in a joint effort with the Fayette County Water System, Trilith Studios installed a 162-foot water tower. The tower was installed as a tribute to the Warner Bros. Water Tower in Burbank, California.

In August 2025, The Wall Street Journal reported that Trilith was "largely empty" given the rising production costs in Georgia, leading many production companies, including Marvel Studios, to choose to film projects elsewhere such as the United Kingdom where it was cheaper to shoot. Trilith Chief Executive Frank Patterson called the decrease in production "cyclical" believing a "new normal" would settle in by 2027. Patterson also stated Trilith was investing in startups that would make content exclusively at the studio.

=== Town at Trilith ===
On July 21, 2016, plans for a mixed-use complex called Pinewood Forest were unveiled. Located across the street from the studio, Pinewood Forest features homes along with plans for "a movie theater, restaurants, boutique hotels, retail and office space", built using environmentally friendly building materials. In preparation for the master-planned community, Dan Cathy was inspired by places like Seaside, Florida, Ponce City Market, and the Chick-Fil-A headquarters. In 2020, when the studio was renamed Trilith Studios, Pinewood Forest was renamed the Town at Trilith. In April 2021, Atlanta magazine ranked the community ninth in their top ten metro Atlanta vibrant city centers list; the community was also the newest featured on the list. In January 2024, the studio's first hotel opened, Trilith Guesthouse, part of Marriot's Tribute Portfolio series.

==== Racial discrimination lawsuit ====
In July 2022, BuzzFeed News covered a story on African Americans alleged unequal racial treatment around Trilith, including complaints in 2018 and 2022. Trilith issued a statement, alleging that five residents who filed the lawsuit "never had any employment or other relationship with Trilith Studios", and condemned the 2022 incident.

=== Trilith Live ===
A movie theater was announced in a press release in December 2018, set to be open in 2020. It was later pushed back to 2021. In 2023, the unbuilt theatre was redesigned into an entertainment complex called "Trilith Live". The complex will include an 1,800-seat auditorium, two live television stages, and various food and retail shops. In addition, two Soundstages were built adjacent to the building – in order to accommodate shows that feature live audiences. Some of the earliest productions that the Soundstages at Trilith Live hosted included a March Madness commercial, a rehearsal spot for Usher, and an unnamed game show. In an interview with The Atlanta Journal-Constitution, Trilith president Rob Parker hoped that the complex would become an international attraction and serve the greater community.

The first phase, which consists of studio spaces, offices, and parking, launched in January 2025. The second phase opened in December 2025. The facility also contains Trilith Cinemas, a nine-screen movie theater operated by the Georgia Theatre Company. Trilith Cinemas is the first theater in the United States to utilize a large-format Samsung Onyx LED screen.

=== Education ===
In 2016, a soundstage at Pinewood Studios was open for educational use by the Georgia Film Academy. The site was formerly occupied by Rivers Elementary School. In late 2020, the Georgia Film Academy partnered with Trilith and the University of Georgia to launch its Master of Fine Arts film program; students would work and live in Trilith during their second year. Trilith also has a small K-12 school called "The Forest School", which was established in 2018.

== Stages, studios, and locations ==
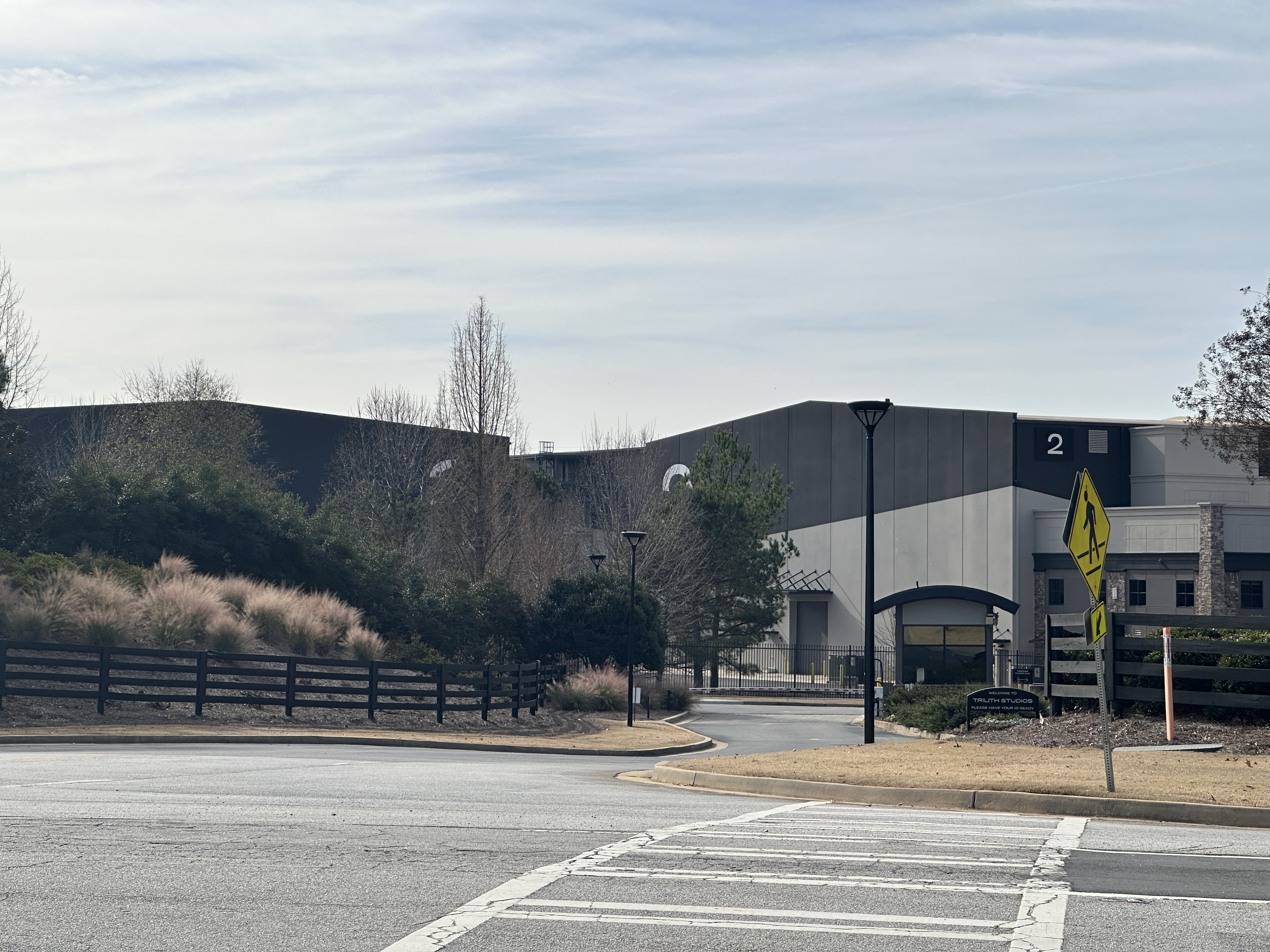
Sound stages at Trilith Studios in 2023.

Trilith Studios encompasses a 700-acre site, with a 400-acre backlot. It features 1 million square feet of production facilities, with 34 soundstages, 40 on-site production vendors, and 75,000 square feet of stages equipped for virtual production technologies. Trilith Studios is the largest production facility in the state of Georgia, and is considered the second largest film and television studio in North America, and the largest outside of Hollywood.

Soundstages at Trilith Studios
Number	Size (in sq ft)
1	15,000 (100x150)
2	15,000 (100x150)
3	20,000 (120x166)
4	20,000 (120x166)
5	30,000 (200x150)
6	30,000 (200x150)
7	20,000 (120x165)
8	20,000 (120x166)
9	18,150 (165x110)
10	15,000 (135x110)
11	15,000 (135x110)
12	15,000 (100x150)
14	15,000 (100x150)
15	20,000 (120x165)
16	20,000 (120x166)
17	40,000 (241x166)
18	18,000 (164x110)
19	15,000 (100x150)
20	15,000 (100x150)
21	18,000 (165x110)
22	18,000 (165x110)
23	18,000 (165x110)
24	20,000 (120x166)
25	20,000 (120x166)
26	30,000 (200x150)
27	20,000 (120x166)
28	20,000 (120x166)
29	20,000 (120x166)
30	20,000 (120x166)
31	40,000 (241x166)
Live A	25,000 (149x164)
Live B	25,000 (149x164)
Stage A	15,000 (135x110)
Town Stage	18,000 (164x110)

=== Prysm Stage ===
The Prysm Stage is a virtual production volume in a purpose-built 18,000 square feet (1,700 m^{2}) stage, featuring 360 degrees of LED panels and ceiling. It is able to accommodate large set pieces, in-camera visual effects, and is equipped for game-engine-driven video playback. Additionally, it has a dedicated process stage designed for automotive shoots. The Prysm Stage is located in Stage 22 of Trilith.

== Productions ==
=== As Pinewood Atlanta Studios ===
==== Films ====
- Ant-Man (2015)
- Captain America: Civil War (2016)
- Passengers (2016)
- Guardians of the Galaxy Vol. 2 (2017)
- Spider-Man: Homecoming (2017)
- Krystal (2017)
- Black Panther (2018)
- Avengers: Infinity War (2018)
- Ant-Man and the Wasp (2018)
- Captain Marvel (2019)
- Avengers: Endgame (2019)
- Zombieland: Double Tap (2019)
- The Tomorrow War (2021)
- The Suicide Squad (2021)

==== Television series ====
- Moon and Me (2019)
- The Walking Dead (S9E16: "The Storm") (2019)
- Love Is Blind (season 1) (2020)
- WandaVision (2021)
- The Falcon and the Winter Soldier (2021)
- Loki (season 1) (2021)

=== As Trilith Studios ===
==== Films ====
- Spider-Man: No Way Home (2021)
- Black Adam (2022)
- Black Panther: Wakanda Forever (2022)
- Devotion (2022)
- Guardians of the Galaxy Vol. 3 (2023)
- Haunted Mansion (2023)
- Megalopolis (2024)
- Saturday Night (2024)
- Captain America: Brave New World (2025)
- The Electric State (2025)
- Thunderbolts* (2025)
- Superman (2025)
- The Breadwinner (2026)
- Moana (2026)
- Man of Tomorrow (2027)
- Lizard Music (TBA)
- Hal (TBA)

==== Television series ====
- Family Feud (seasons 23–25; 28) (2021–2024; 2026)
- Hawkeye (2021)
- Steve on Watch (2021)
- Capital One College Bowl (season 2) (2022)
- Ms. Marvel (2022)
- She-Hulk: Attorney at Law (2022)
- Judge Steve Harvey (2022)
- Werewolf by Night (2022)
- The Guardians of the Galaxy Holiday Special (2022)
- I Can See Your Voice (season 3) (2024)
- Echo (2024)
- Agatha All Along (2024)
- Ironheart (2025)
- Peacemaker (season 2) (2025)
- American Idol (season 25) (2027)
