= Fely Irvine =

Australian actress, singer and dancer

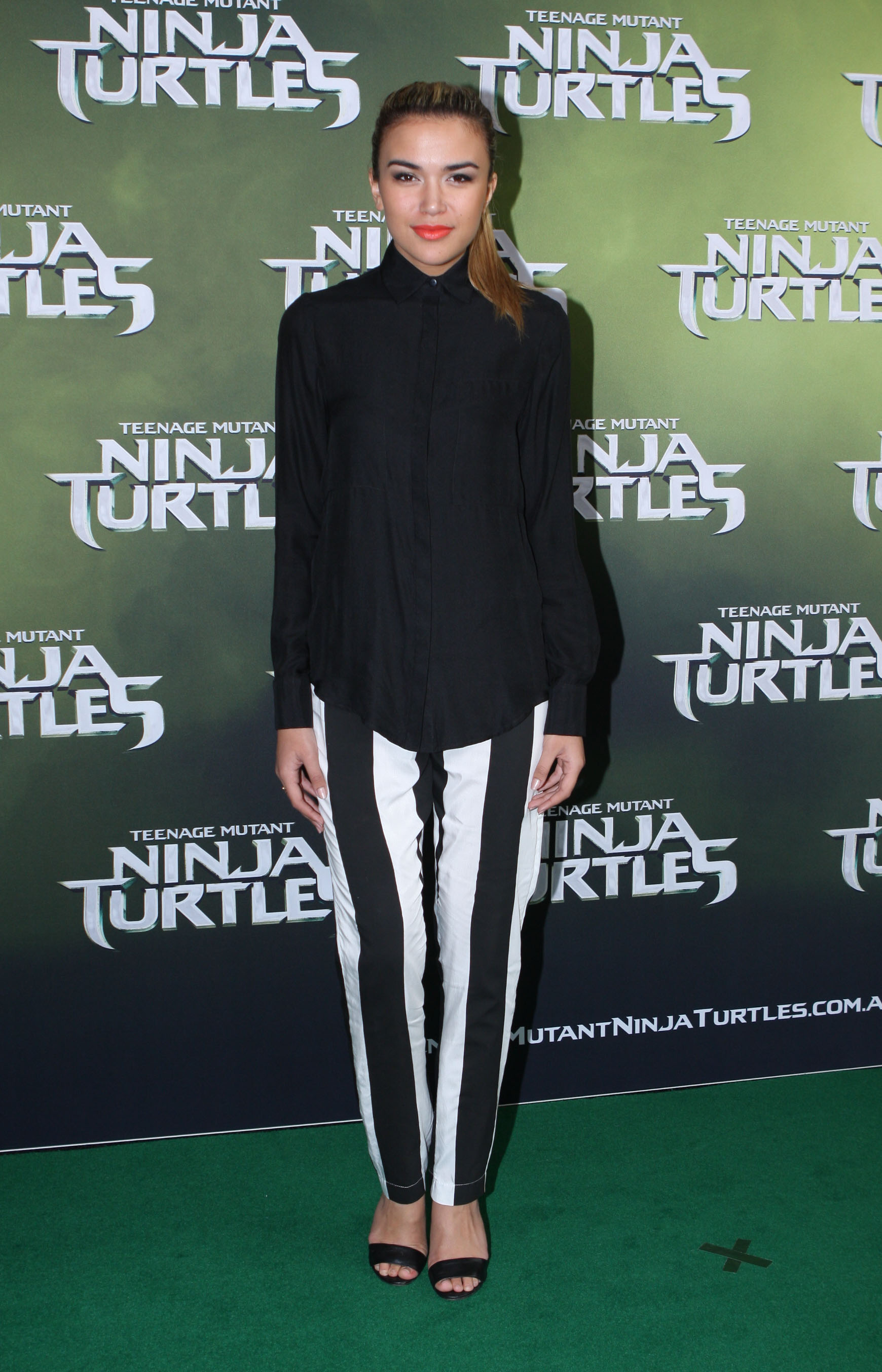
- Irvine in 2014
- Born: 9 January 1989 (age 37); Australia
- Occupations: singer, actress, dancer
- Years active: 2003–present
- Spouse: Tai Hara (m. 2017)
- Children: 2
- Musical career
- Genre: Pop, children's music

Fely Irvine (born 9 January 1989) is an Australian actress, singer and dancer. She was a former member of Hi-5 between 2009 and 2011 after three years with the group and became a contestant in The Voice.

== Personal life ==
Irvine became engaged to Home and Away star Tai Hara in January 2015, and the couple married in Bali in January 2017. Their first child, a daughter, was born in late 2020. She went on the live in the U.S. where she sings on the Mastros circuit. She was a contestant on American Idol and made top 60. She is of Filipino and Scottish ancestry.

== Filmography ==
Film roles
Year	Title	Role	
2010	Operation: Endgame	Sadie	Uncredited

Television roles
Year	Title	Role	Notes
2009–11	Hi-5	Herself	Series 11 to 13
