= Iskandar Malaysia Studios =

Studio complex in Malaysia

Coordinates: 1.4083774°N 103.6370128°E

- Interactive map of the Iskandar Malaysia Studios area

General information
- Status: Operational
- Type: Film Studios
- Architectural style: Modernism
- Completed: 2014

Website
- iskandarmalaysiastudios.com

Iskandar Malaysia Studios (IMS) is a studio complex located at a twenty hectares (49 acres) site in Iskandar Puteri, Johor Bahru District, Johor, Malaysia. It targets the Asia-Pacific region.

== History ==
Pinewood Shepperton plc (now Pinewood Group) entered into a strategic agreement with Khazanah Nasional Berhad (the investment holding arm of the Government of Malaysia) in connection with the development of a new film and television studio facility in Iskandar, Malaysia. Construction began towards the end of 2010, with completion initially expected by the end of 2012. The project designers were GDP Architects, Kuala Lumpur and structural engineer Hossein Rezai of Web Structures. The facility officially opened on 14 June 2014.

In July 2019, Pinewood Iskandar Malaysia Studios was rebranded to Iskandar Malaysia Studios following its affiliation with Pinewood Shepperton plc ended.

In March 31, 2023, Singaporean entertainment company, GHY Culture & Media announced its intent in a filing on the Singapore Exchange to acquire 80% of majority stake in Iskandar Malaysia Studios. Later, on April 9, Khazanah Nasional's wholly owned special-purpose vehicle, Granatum Ventures, has entered into a definitive share sale agreement to divest its 100% stake in the studio to Studio Management Services (SMS), a consortium led by its current Malaysian management team in partnership with GHY, to attract foreign investment as well as to brought the economic and social benefits to Malaysia.

In June 2023, Deputy Finance Minister, Steven Sim said that Khazanah only divest its shares in Iskandar Malaysia Studios to looking for a new partner which could better manage the studio, but did not sold the studio's assets.

== Stages, TV studios and facilities ==
The facilities in the studio complex include 9,300 m^{2} (100,000 sq ft) of film stages, ranging from 1,400 m^{2} (15,000 sq ft) to 2,800 m^{2} (30,000 sq ft). The first two at 1,400 m^{2} (15,000 sq ft) while the other two at 1,900 m^{2} (20,000 sq ft). The biggest stage at 2,800 m^{2} (30,000 sq ft) has a water tank for productions that require work on or under water. There are 2 TV studios, each at 1,100 m^{2} (12,000 sq ft). The studio holds Southeast Asia's largest paddock tank measuring 65 m (213 ft) x 65 m (213 ft) and 1.4 m (4 ft 7 in) deep and a deep water tank with a diameter of 18 m (59 ft) and depth of 5.6 m (18 ft).

== Productions ==
- Marco Polo (Netflix)
- Lost in the Pacific (2015)
- Projek Komedi Warna (2015) Astro Warna / Mustika HD / On the Go
- Elak-Elak (2015) Astro Warna
- Star Quest (2015) Astro Wah Lai Toi
- Asia's Got Talent Season 1 (Auditions & Semi-finals Episode) (2015)
- Astro Classic Golden Melody (2015) Astro AEC
- Gempak Superstar (2016)
- Sembang Teh Tarik Kaw (2016)
- CS Go: Minor Championship Asia (2016)
- Hi-5 (2017)
- Crazy Rich Asians (2017)
- The Voice 决战好声 (Singapore/Malaysia edition) (2017)
- T2 Asia-Pacific Table Tennis League Season 1 (2017)
- Gegar Vaganza (Final) (2017)
- Asia's Got Talent Season 2 (Auditions & Semi-finals Episode) (2017)
- Hello, Mrs. Money (2018)
- Asia's Got Talent Season 3 (Auditions & Semi-finals Episode) (2019)
- Strike Back Season 7 (2019)
- Enemy Within (2019)
- Sembilan (2019)
- Disney's Wizards of Warna Walk (2019)
