= Underwater Stage =

British underwater film studio

The Underwater Stage is an underwater film and television studio stage at Pinewood Studios in Iver, Buckinghamshire, United Kingdom. It is the only one of its kind in Europe. The stage was opened in 2005 after four years of planning and development. The stage's tank is permanently filled, and the water is constantly heated, maintained at 30 ˚C (87 ˚F). The water is filtered using an ultraviolet system which creates crystal clear water and a comfortable environment to work in, for both cast and crew.

Plans for the construction of the stage were first announced in April 2004. The stage was opened on 18 May 2005, by Gordon Brown, the then Chancellor of the Exchequer. Brown opened the stage by pressing a button that dropped a car into the water tank.

The stage has been used for television, film, commercials, pop videos and photo shoots. The stage has hosted: The Da Vinci Code, Basic Instinct 2, Scoop, Silent Witness, a music video for James Blunt, and a Water Aid promotion with actress Keira Knightley. It has also been utilised for scientific experiments involving imaging sonar.
