= Hi-5 (Australian group) =

Australian children's musical group

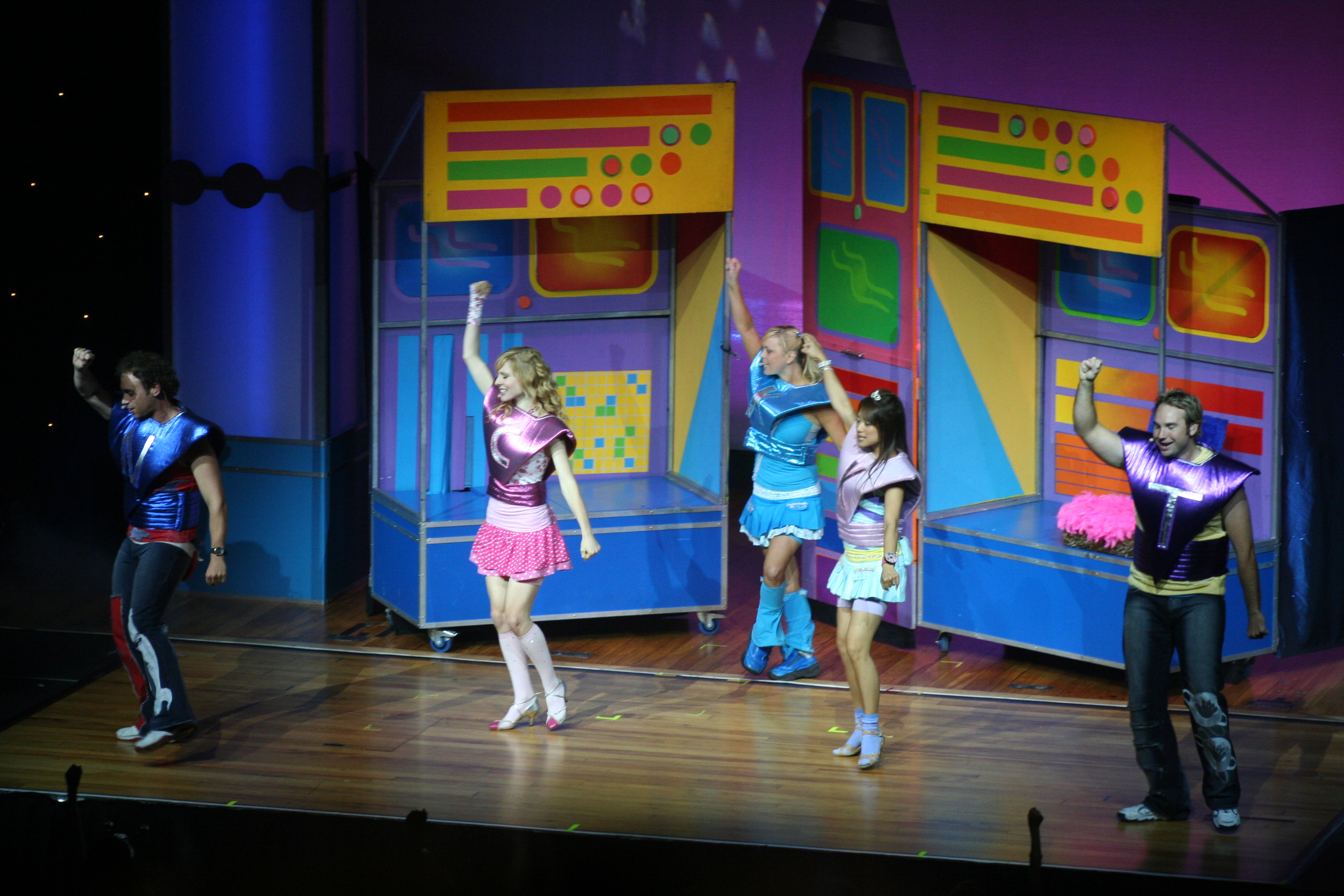
- Hi-5 in Wellington in 2006. From left to right: Nathan Foley, Charli Robinson, Kellie Crawford, Kathleen de Leon Jones and Tim Harding

Background information
- Origin: Sydney, New South Wales, Australia
- Genres: Children's; edutainment; pop
- Years active: 1998–2019
- Label: Sony
- Past members: See Members below

Hi-5 were an Australian children's musical group formed in 1998 in association with the children's television series of the same name. Helena Harris and Posie Graeme-Evans created the television series for the Nine Network, which premiered in 1999. The group were made up of five performers who entertained and educated preschool children through music, movement, and play. Kellie Crawford, Kathleen de Leon Jones, Nathan Foley, Tim Harding and Charli Robinson were the founding members. By the end of 2008, all of the original line-up had left, and the group's membership changed several more times after that. They collectively starred in several television series, released albums, and performed on worldwide tours. The television series features puppet characters Chatterbox and Jup Jup, who were included in the group's live stage shows.

Hi-5 were one of Australia's highest paid entertainment groups, placing in the Business Review Weekly's annual list several times, earning an estimated A$18 million in 2007. As employees of the brand, once owned by the Nine Network, the members of Hi-5 did not hold equity. The Australian Recording Industry Association (ARIA) certified their albums as double platinum (It's a Party), platinum (Jump and Jive with Hi-5, Boom Boom Beat, It's a Hi-5 Christmas) and gold (Celebrate). Four of them reached the top 10 on the ARIA Albums Chart; It's a Party (number four, July 2000), Boom Boom Beat (number three, August 2001), It's a Hi-5 Christmas (number four, December 2001) and Hi-5 Hits (number ten, July 2003). By 2004, the original line-up had received three Logie Television Awards for Most Outstanding Children's Program and five consecutive ARIA Music Awards for Best Children's Album.

The group's later iterations did not enjoy the same popularity or critical success as its original line-up. Hi-5 were last nominated for a major Australian award in 2012 and last released an album in 2014. The Nine Network sold the brand in 2012 to Malaysian-based group Asiasons, who shifted its commercial focus to the Southeast Asian market. After a short-lived television revival in 2017, the group's production company wholly relocated to Singapore and began employing a roster of temporary performers for touring purposes until 2019.

== History ==
=== 1998–1999: Formation ===
Hi-5 were formed in September 1998 in Sydney, Australia, as a children's musical group. Television producer Helena Harris, who had worked on Bananas in Pyjamas, co-created Hi-5 as a concept for a new television show of the same name for the Nine Network. She and co-producer Posie Graeme-Evans developed the series as preschool entertainment, blending educational theories with a musical appeal to capture children's attention. The name of the series and featured group was derived from the high five gesture. Harris said that while Hi-5 was predominantly a television series, its music was able to be differentiated from the show. Featuring five performers, the cast were intended to act as the audience's older siblings or friends, rather than adults teaching children. Harris was inspired to develop a show with broad appeal and accessible themes such as family and animals. She modelled the group's style on the fast-paced nature of contemporary music videos and strove to allude to items of current interest (such as relevant curriculum as well as popular jokes, films and music) to keep children engaged. Harris recalled watching the Spice Girls, whose dance moves she believed preschoolers could copy. The creators saw the need for "life-affirming" television for rapidly maturing preschoolers and found most children learn from programs which use music and movement.

After auditions for the group in June 1998 (narrowing down around 300 people to only five), the television pilot for Hi-5 was produced in mid-1998. The original cast consisted of Kellie Crawford (née Hoggart), Kathleen de Leon Jones, Nathan Foley, Tim Harding and Charli Robinson. After being commissioned, production began in October 1998. The first series premiered in April 1999 on the Nine Network. In September, Sony Music released their debut album, Jump and Jive with Hi-5, which reached number 33 on the Australian Recording Industry Association (ARIA) Albums Chart.

=== 2000–2006: Early success ===
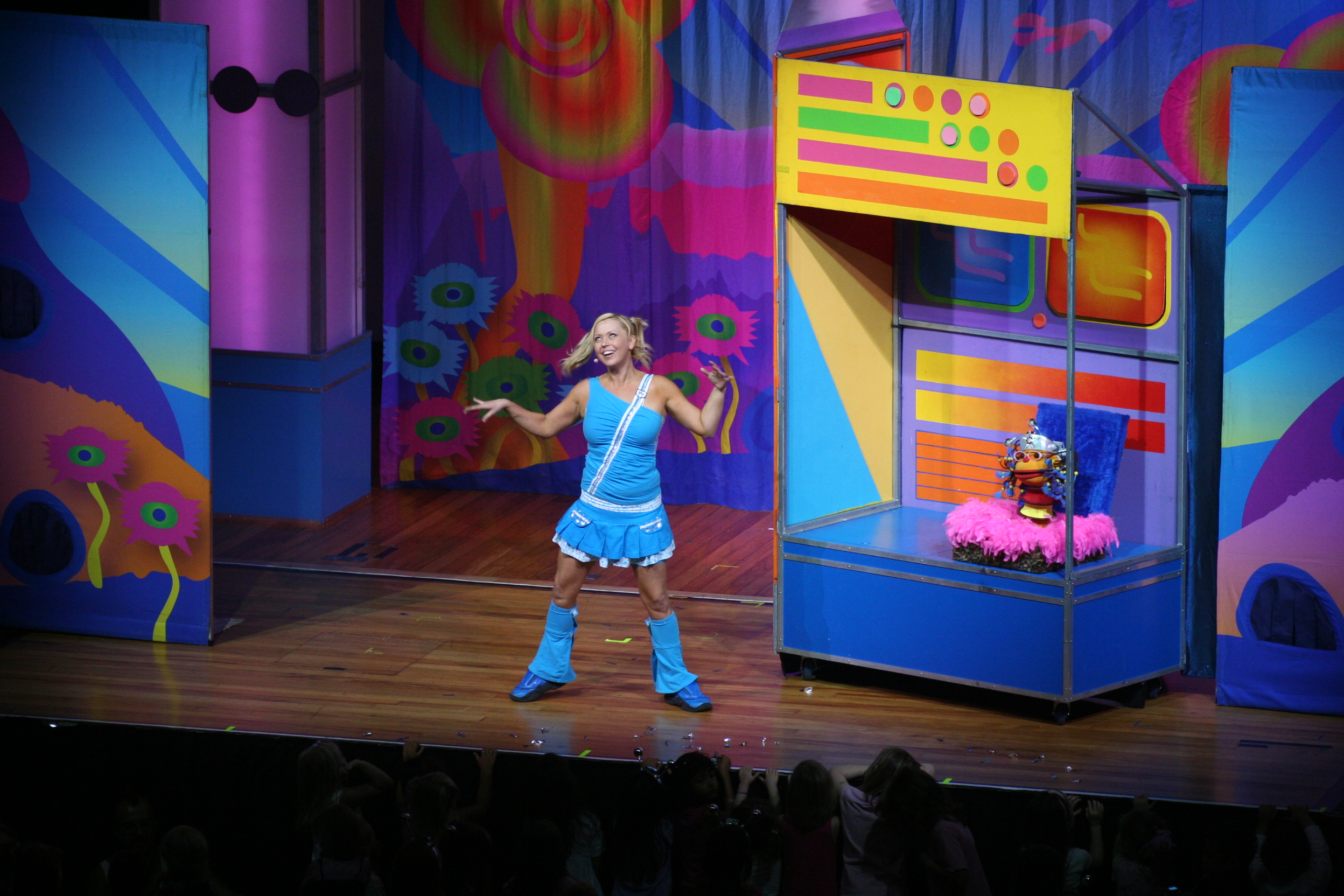
Kellie Crawford and puppet character Chatterbox, January 2006

Hi-5 won the 2000 Logie Award for Most Outstanding Children's Program in recognition of their television program, and the ARIA Award for Best Children's Album for Jump and Jive with Hi-5. Their releases consistently received album accreditations; Celebrate was certified as gold, while Jump and Jive with Hi-5, Boom Boom Beat and It's a Hi-5 Christmas went platinum, and It's a Party received double platinum status. Four of their albums reached the top 10 on the ARIA Albums Chart; It's a Party (number four, July 2000), Boom Boom Beat (number three, August 2001), It's a Hi-5 Christmas (number four, December 2001) and Hi-5 Hits (number ten, July 2003). It was reported in 2005 that a feature film starring the group was in early development, as well as arrangements for a single release.

Hi-5 toured nationally for up to eight months of every year, with sell-out concerts in venues such as the Sydney Opera House. The quintet's production of Hi-5 Alive won the 2002 Helpmann Award for Best Presentation for Children, while their Space Magic production was nominated in the same category in 2006. The group first toured the UK in 2004, and in 2005 performed in arenas around Australia to maximise the audience capacity. In addition to their regular tours, Hi-5 appeared annually at Vision Australia's Carols by Candlelight in Melbourne, broadcast live by the Nine Network on Christmas Eve.

=== 2006–2008: Replacement of original members ===
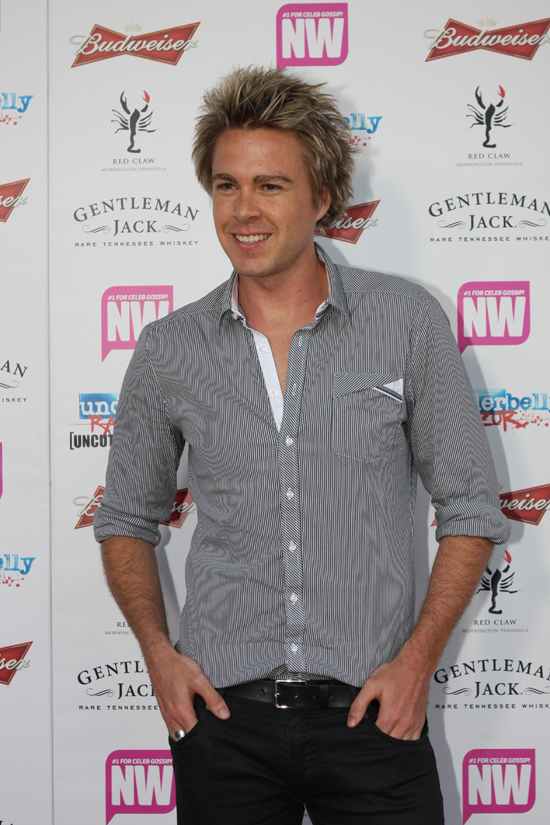
Stevie Nicholson, Surry Hills, November 2011

In early 2006, de Leon Jones announced she was pregnant, and would take maternity leave from April onwards. Sun Park was introduced as her temporary replacement; de Leon Jones gave birth to her first child in July. Park was part of the television series filming in 2006 and toured with the group across Australia. In July 2006, de Leon Jones said she was intent on returning to Hi-5; however, in July 2007, made the decision to leave the group permanently to focus on being a mother. Park took her place as a full-time member.

A serious motorcycle accident in June 2007 left Harding unable to keep up with the pace of Hi-5's performances. Just a few days before this, Stevie Nicholson had been hired as an understudy and was put straight to work as a temporary replacement for Harding. The group toured the Hi-5 Circus Stageshow in 2007; the show adopted a circus theme and incorporated tricks such as trapeze, tightrope walking, and gymnastics. They had only one week of training; some members benefitted from prior experience. Nicholson debuted on tour with the Circus show in Singapore. Harding permanently departed in November after recovering from his injuries and was replaced by Nicholson.

Robinson (then referred to as Delaney) exited from the group in February 2008. She expressed an interest in proving herself as an actor for an adult audience and said she would help find a replacement member. After leaving, she established a career in the Australian media industry as a presenter. In April, Casey Burgess was revealed as Robinson's replacement and began touring with the group.

In March 2008, the Nine Network, along with production company Southern Star, purchased the Hi-5 brand. The change of ownership saw Harris and Graeme-Evans end their involvement with the franchise, which was placed under the direction of Martin Hersov and Cathy Payne, Nine and Southern Star executives.

By November 2008, the remaining original cast members had stated their intent to withdraw from the group. Crawford reported in October that she would be leaving at the end of the year to explore other options, and a month later, Foley outlined his plan to exit and focus on his adult music career. In December, Park also stated she would be departing the group since she had expected only to be a temporary replacement. The Daily Telegraph's Sydney Confidential reporter alleged that Hi-5's production company had asked Crawford and Foley to leave, and that the producers were "opting to recruit younger, cheaper performers". Neither of them responded to these reports, but Park denied the industry rumours, saying that there had been no pressure for any of them to resign. The departing members gave their final performance at Carols by Candlelight on Christmas Eve in Melbourne.

=== 2009–2013: Second generation ===
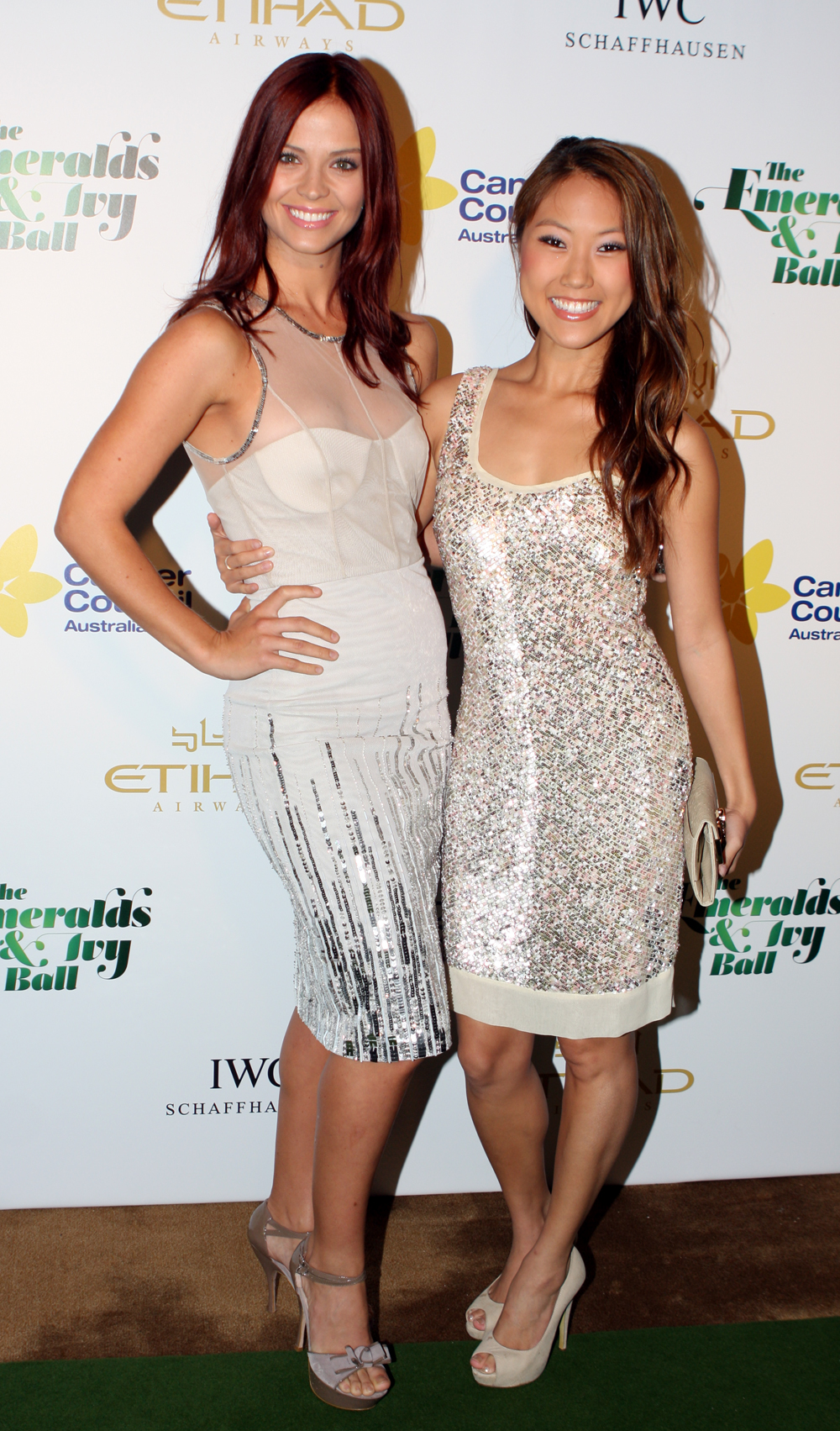
Lauren Brant and Dayen Zheng, The Ivy Ballroom, Sydney, November 2012

In February 2009, Lauren Brant, Fely Irvine, and Tim Maddren joined Nicholson and Burgess to complete the group's new line-up. Burgess described the change as a difficult transition period that led to uncertainty over their future. They toured regional Australian locations in early 2010 to build a new audience. The group celebrated the 500th episode of the television series in 2010, and in 2011, they rerecorded several of the original line-up's songs. They did not receive the same positive critical reception as the original members; one reviewer found fault with the new line-up's vocal abilities. The group joined World Vision Australia as ambassadors in 2009, beginning their work in the Philippines while on a promotional tour, and completing a volunteer trip to Cambodia in 2012. They also became representatives of the Starlight Children's Foundation in 2009; their work included regular visits to hospitals while on tour.

Irvine's final performance as part of Hi-5 was at Carols by Candlelight on Christmas Eve 2011. Nine Network representatives said she would leave to explore "other career options". Her replacement, Dayen Zheng, joined the group in January 2012. Burgess and Maddren departed in early 2013; Maddren had secured a role in the Australian musical production of The Addams Family, while Burgess had decided to further her solo music career.

In June 2012, the Nine Network announced that because of their ongoing financial difficulties, they had sold the Hi-5 brand in its entirety to Malaysian-based equity group, Asiasons. Datuk Jared Lim, Asiasons's managing director, described plans to expand Hi-5 throughout Southeast Asia, while keeping the group's presence in Australia intact. Julie Greene, former producer of the television series, assumed the role of executive creative director.

=== 2013–2016: Third generation, shift to Southeast Asia ===
New members Mary Lascaris and Ainsley Melham joined Nicholson, Brant, and Zheng in early 2013. The audition process was filmed and turned into a documentary-style film, Some Kind of Wonderful, which premiered exclusively through Hoyts Cinemas in Australia in March. The press branded this line-up as a "new generation" of the group.

Throughout this period, the production company shifted the commercial focus of the group to the Southeast Asian market, with an increase in Asian touring locations. In 2014, the group debuted in the Middle East with a Dubai show and toured Bangkok for the first time in ten years. They returned to the Philippines in 2015 for an encore season after a sold-out run of concerts the previous year. A new television series entitled Hi-5 House was filmed in Singapore and Malaysia between 2013 and 2015, and aired on pay-TV channel Nick Jr. in Australia and Disney Junior in Asia; its success in Asia resulted in an Asian Television Award for Best Preschool Program in 2015. The program premiered worldwide on online television streaming service Netflix in March 2016.

Brant's final performances were in July 2014 for the Australian House Hits tour, in which the cast wore costumes she designed under her new fashion label, Loliboli. Her successor, Tanika Anderson, was already working with the group as an understudy and puppeteer. Nicholson departed in December 2015 to further his performing career and promote his children's book, Superdudes. He was replaced by Lachie Dearing, who was introduced on tour in January 2016. After being cast in an Australian musical production of Xanadu in January 2016, Melham left the group, and new member Gabe Brown took his place in February. Brown was later succeeded by Chris White.

=== 2016–2019: Fourth generation, short-lived television revival ===
The Nine Network renewed its partnership with the Hi-5 franchise in October 2016 and expressed plans to revive the original television series with a new cast in 2017. As a result, Zheng, Lascaris, Anderson and White gave their last performances in December 2016. After auditions were held in November 2016, new members Courtney Clarke, Shay Clifford, Joe Kalou and Bailey Spalding were revealed in December, joining Dearing to form the fourth generation of the group. The quintet debuted at Carols by Candlelight on Christmas Eve, Hi-5's first appearance at the Nine event since 2012. The new television series was filmed in Malaysia and premiered in May 2017 on Nine's multichannel, 9Go! in Australia. Additional filming in 2018 was halted before the Australian production office was closed and the brand was relocated to Singapore. All five members departed the group, and the brand used temporary touring members for the remainder of 2018. The franchise continued employing non-permanent performers for touring purposes in 2019.

== Musical style ==
Hi-5 were described as "a pop group for kids" by Foley in 2004. Chris Harriott was the group's primary composer, writing thousands of their tracks. Graeme-Evans and Harriott had worked together when he scored the themes for the teen dramas series, The Miraculous Mellops (1991) and Mirror, Mirror (1995), and he had worked on his own in Australian theatre. The creators approached him and tasked him with writing top ten songs for an age range of two to six. Harriott worked regularly with a group of lyricists, including Chris Phillips, Leone Carey and Lisa Hoppe. Foley cited the Wiggles as an influence of Hi-5, but noted the respective groups had different musical styles, with Harriott's compositions resembling top 40 rather than nursery rhymes. Original member of the Wiggles and classical musician Phillip Wilcher commended the gentle educational appeal of Hi-5's music, and declared that they seemed to "know the subtle difference between childlike and childish."

=== Educational value ===
"We are a pop group but with educational values and we push this as much as possible. We take on a big brother or sister role as opposed to a parental role and just try to have fun."

— Nathan Foley, 2004

Hi-5, and the related television series, blended educational aspects with music and movement, while regularly updating the music and costumes to remain "abreast of the times". The members were presented as older siblings or friends to their young audience, rather than appearing as adults teaching them. The series' creators loosely based it on an underlying educational structure influenced by Howard Gardner's theory of multiple intelligences. The producers recognised that most children have a preferred style of learning, and structured the group's work to have each member modelling skills in a specific area such as kinesthetic learning and musicality. Harris observed most children would identify with the presenter who demonstrated their favoured learning style. According to the group's website, Hi-5 incorporated Piaget's theory of cognitive development. The educational theory caters to a wide range of ages in the audience while being aimed primarily at children aged two to eight. Harris intended for the central themes promoted to be universally accessible, as she believed children are essentially the same around the world. The pace and design of the group's performances were influenced by that of contemporary music videos. They encouraged participation at their live stage shows through interactive elements with which the children engage. Group members expressed that performances were adapted to include more songs and physical elements in countries where English is not the main spoken language.

== Brand and finances ==
Hi-5 brand creators, Harris and Graeme-Evans, originally owned it under their joint production company Kids Like Us. In contrast to their peer entertainers, the Wiggles, the cast of Hi-5 did not hold equity, but were employees of the brand. Crawford noted, "the money system has to go a long way around before it gets to us". In March 2008, the Nine Network and production company Southern Star purchased the Hi-5 brand. The franchise was placed under the direction of Martin Hersov and Cathy Payne, Nine and Southern Star executives, while Harris and Graeme-Evans ended their involvement with the company with the sale. (Note: Graeme-Evans only served as a co-producer for the first two series of the television show.)

The brand dropped from a net worth of A$18 million in 2009 to A$9.7 million in 2010. In June 2012, the Nine Network sold the Hi-5 brand to Asian equity group, Asiasons, through a private fund. The company planned to expand the brand throughout Southeast Asia, while maintaining its presence in Australia. Former series' producer Julie Greene became the brand's executive creative director. The Hi-5 brand was consolidated under Tremendous Entertainment in 2014, after the equity fund was sold. The Nine Network renewed its partnership with the Hi-5 franchise in October 2016 and participated in the production of a new television series in 2017. In September 2018, the Australian production office was closed; the entire franchise relocated to Singapore.

The franchise launched a series of international versions; each group toured and produced local adaptations of the television series. In 2002, an American version of Hi-5 was created; the group filmed for television, recorded albums and toured. By 2005, franchises local to India, South America and Germany were planned, but these did not eventuate. A television series and a tour introduced the UK group in 2008. After the brand's sale in 2012, there was a return to licensing international groups. In 2014, a Latin American group was created, followed by a local version for the Philippines in 2015, and the introduction of an Indonesian group in 2017.

== Reception ==
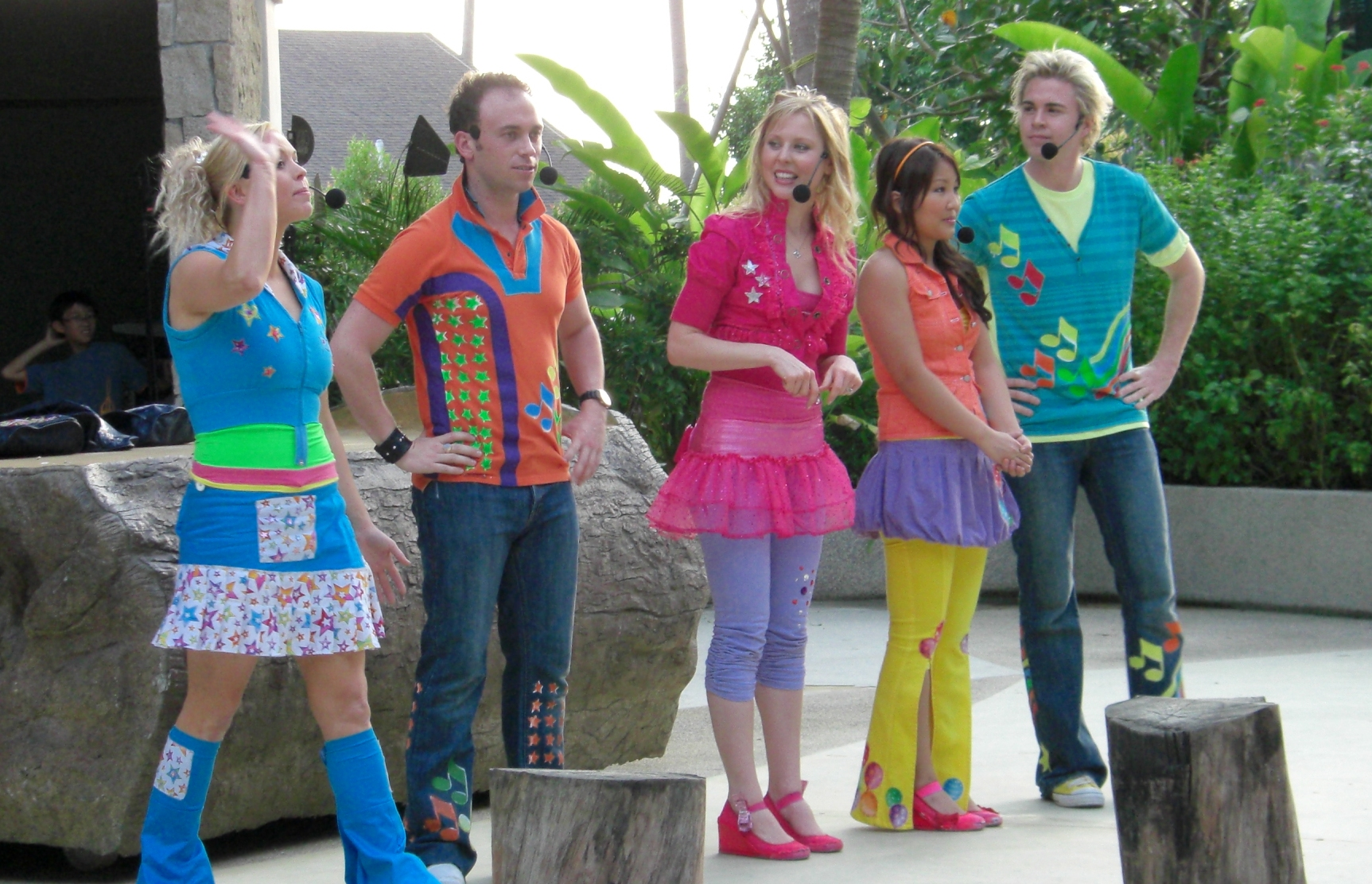
Group members in 2007 (L-R): Kellie Crawford, Nathan Foley, Charli Robinson, Sun Park, and Stevie Nicholson

=== Commercial performance ===
Business Review Weekly's annual Australian income list recognised the group as one of the country's highest paid entertainment groups, estimating annual earnings of A$18 million in 2007. The franchise was reported as Australia's highest selling children's music property in 2007. The original quintet consistently received album ARIA accreditations for their releases: Celebrate was accredited as gold, while Jump and Jive with Hi-5, Boom Boom Beat and It's a Hi-5 Christmas went platinum. It's a Party received double platinum status. Four of the original line-up's albums reached the top 10 on the ARIA Albums Chart – It's a Party peaked at number four in July 2000; Boom Boom Beat reached number three in August 2001; It's a Hi-5 Christmas at number four in December 2001; and their greatest hits album, Hi-5 Hits, reached number ten in July 2003.

=== Critical reviews ===
Critics in the Australian press often described Hi-5 as quality children's entertainment. The original line-up were praised both as a cohesive ensemble, and for their talents at singing and dancing. Reviewers highlighted the group members' energy and enthusiasm. Hi-5's music has been described as simple, "infectious", and inspired by pop music. The brand's employment of diverse performers, to serve as positive role models for children, was well-received. The group's concert tours were admired for the fast pace of the shows and the bright colours of the staging design. Reviewing the Circus Stageshow in 2008, Nicole Bittar of The Age described the members as versatile and cheerful, and commended their circus skills. A 2015 concert was viewed by The Daily Telegraph as "well-choreographed and performed". The group's productions have also been noted for their humour, incorporating slapstick elements inspired by pantomime comedy. Reporters said they had a teenage and adult following, with dedicated older fans; adult followers in the Philippines would use the group's songs to learn English.

Later iterations of the group were criticised for their performances, and the brand was criticised for frequent membership changes. In her blog for The Daily Telegraph in 2011, Sarrah Le Marquand found fault with Brant's musical abilities, claiming that while she was an enthusiastic entertainer, she had limited vocal talent. The reporter went on to suggest the entire line-up at the time were "melodically challenged". A business blog argued that the group's target audience was unclear; while the franchise was aimed at preschoolers, the music and choreography seemed too complicated and like it was designed for an audience of older children. The writer stated that the group had undefined member roles and that the performers attempted to upstage each other. Similarly, in a 2011 survey by the Australian Council on Children and the Media, parents condemned the costuming of the group, stating it was inappropriate for the audience and "premature sexualisation". Commentators have expressed disapproval of the franchise frequently replacing its performers with new talent; the newer line-ups were described as unrecognisable. Critiquing the debut of a new line-up at Carols by Candlelight in 2016, David Knox wrote that the performance was unmemorable, and suggested that their strengths were not demonstrated at the event.

== Members ==
Original members

- Kellie Crawford (1998–2008)
- Kathleen de Leon Jones (1998–2006)
- Nathan Foley (1998–2008)
- Tim Harding (1998–2007)
- Charli Robinson (1998–2008)

Former members

- Sun Park (2006–2008)
- Stevie Nicholson (2007–2015) (Note: Nicholson returned as a guest performer in December 2018 and November 2019.)
- Casey Burgess (2008–2013)
- Lauren Brant (2009–2014)
- Fely Irvine (2009–2011)
- Tim Maddren (2009–2013)
- Dayen Zheng (2012–2016)
- Mary Lascaris (2013–2016)
- Ainsley Melham (2013–2016)
- Tanika Anderson (2014–2016) (Note: Anderson joined as an understudy in October 2013 before becoming a regular member in July 2014. She returned as a guest performer in December 2018 and November 2019.)
- Lachie Dearing (2016–2018)
- Gabe Brown (2016)
- Chris White (2016)
- Courtney Clarke (2016–2018)
- Shay Clifford (2016–2018)
- Joe Kalou (2016–2018)
- Bailey Spalding (2016–2018)

== Discography ==
- Jump and Jive with Hi-5 (1999)
- It's a Party (2000)
- Boom Boom Beat (2001)
- It's a Hi-5 Christmas (2001)
- Celebrate (2002)
- Hi-5 Holiday (2003)
- Jingle Jangle Jingle with Hi-5 (2004)
- Making Music (2005)
- Wish Upon a Star (2006)
- Wow! (2007)
- Planet Earth (2008)
- Spin Me Round (2009)
- Turn the Music Up! (2010)
- Sing it Loud (2011)
- Hi-5 Hot Hits! (2014)

== Awards and nominations ==
List of awards and nominations received by Hi-5
Award	Year	Recipient(s) and nominee(s)	Category	Result	Ref.
ADVIA Awards	2006	Action Heroes	Best DVD Marketing Campaign	Won	
Apollo Awards	2015	Chris Harriott, Various (for Hi-5 House)	Best Music Composition (Full Length)	Nominated	
APRA Screen Music Awards	2000	Chris Harriott, Leone Carey (for "Ready or Not")	Most Performed Children's Work	Won	
APRA Screen Music Awards	2002	Chris Harriott, Lisa Hoppe, Chris Phillips (for "Opposites Attract")	Best Music for Children's Television	Nominated	
APRA Screen Music Awards	2002	Chris Harriott, Various (for songlets)	Best Music for Children's Television	Nominated	
APRA Screen Music Awards	2003	Chris Harriott, Lisa Hoppe (for "Celebrate")	Best Music for Children's Television	Nominated	
APRA Screen Music Awards	2005	Chris Harriott, Leone Carey (for "Making Music")	Best Original Song Composed for a Feature Film, Telemovie, TV Series or Mini-Series	Nominated	
ARIA Music Awards	2000	Jump and Jive with Hi-5	Best Children's Album	Won	
ARIA Music Awards	2001	It's a Party	Best Children's Album	Won	
ARIA Music Awards	2002	Boom Boom Beat	Best Children's Album	Won	
ARIA Music Awards	2003	Celebrate	Best Children's Album	Won	
ARIA Music Awards	2004	Hi-5 Holiday	Best Children's Album	Won	
ARIA Music Awards	2005	Making Music	Best Children's Album	Nominated	
ARIA Music Awards	2006	Wish Upon a Star	Best Children's Album	Nominated	
ARIA Music Awards	2007	Wow!	Best Children's Album	Nominated	
ARIA Music Awards	2008	Planet Earth	Best Children's Album	Nominated	
ARIA Music Awards	2011	Turn the Music Up!	Best Children's Album	Nominated	
ARIA Music Awards	2012	Sing it Loud	Best Children's Album	Nominated	
Asian Academy Creative Awards	2018	Hi-5 (for "Vehicles")	Best Children's Entertainment or Drama	Won	
Asian Academy Creative Awards	2018	Hi-5 (for "Cultural Festivals")	Best Preschool Programme	Won	
Asian Television Awards	2007	Hi-5	Best Children's Programme	Runner-up	
Asian Television Awards	2010	Hi-5	Best Children's Programme	Nominated	
Asian Television Awards	2015	Hi-5 House	Best Preschool Programme	Won	
Asian Television Awards	2016	Hi-5 House	Best Preschool Programme	Nominated	
Asian Television Awards	2017	Hi-5	Best Preschool Programme	Won	
Helpmann Awards	2002	Hi-5 Alive	Best Presentation for Children	Won	
Helpmann Awards	2006	Space Magic	Best Presentation for Children	Nominated	
Logie Awards	2000	Hi-5	Most Outstanding Children's Program	Won	
Logie Awards	2001	Hi-5	Most Outstanding Children's Program	Won (Tied) (Note: Hi-5 was tied with Round the Twist.)	
Logie Awards	2002	Hi-5	Most Outstanding Children's Program	Nominated	
Logie Awards	2003	Hi-5	Most Outstanding Children's Program	Nominated	
Logie Awards	2004	Hi-5	Most Outstanding Children's Preschool Program	Won	
Logie Awards	2005	Hi-5	Most Outstanding Children's Program	Nominated	
Logie Awards	2006	Hi-5	Most Outstanding Children's Program	Nominated	
Logie Awards	2008	Hi-5	Most Outstanding Children's Program	Nominated	
Logie Awards	2010	Hi-5	Most Outstanding Children's Program	Nominated	
Logie Awards	2011	Hi-5	Most Outstanding Children's Program	Nominated	
