= Pinewood Toronto Studios =

Filming location

Coordinates: 43°38′57.94″N 79°20′30.98″W

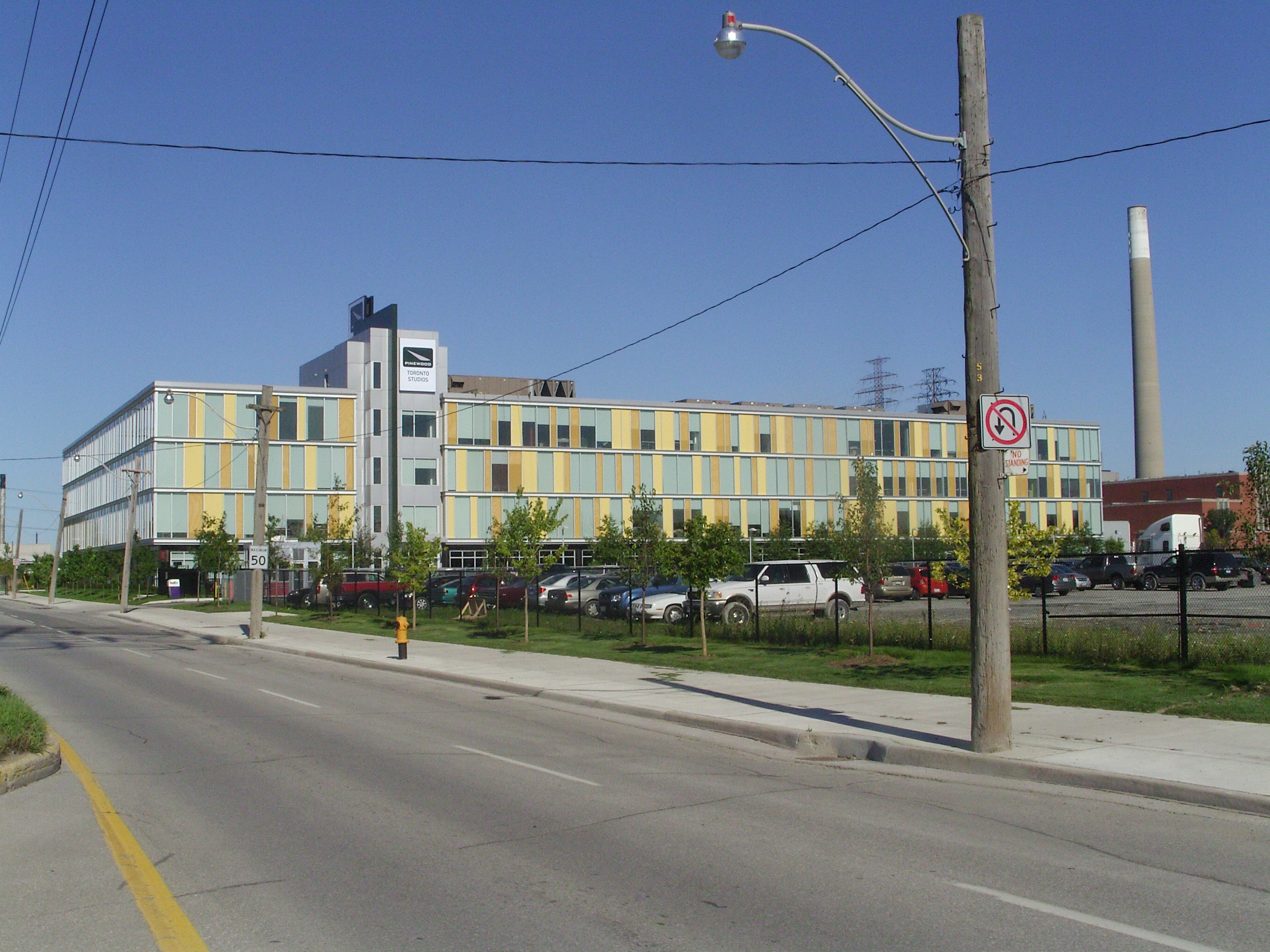
Exterior view, Commissioners Street

Pinewood Toronto Studios (formerly known as Filmport) is a major film and television studio complex in Toronto, Ontario, Canada and is the largest of its kind in Canada. It is the first in Toronto capable of accommodating the production of large-scale films. The studio is named for the British Pinewood Studios Group. In March 2018, it was announced that Bell Media would be buying a controlling stake in the studio.

It is located across the shipping channel from Hearn Generating Station along Commissioners Street.

== History ==
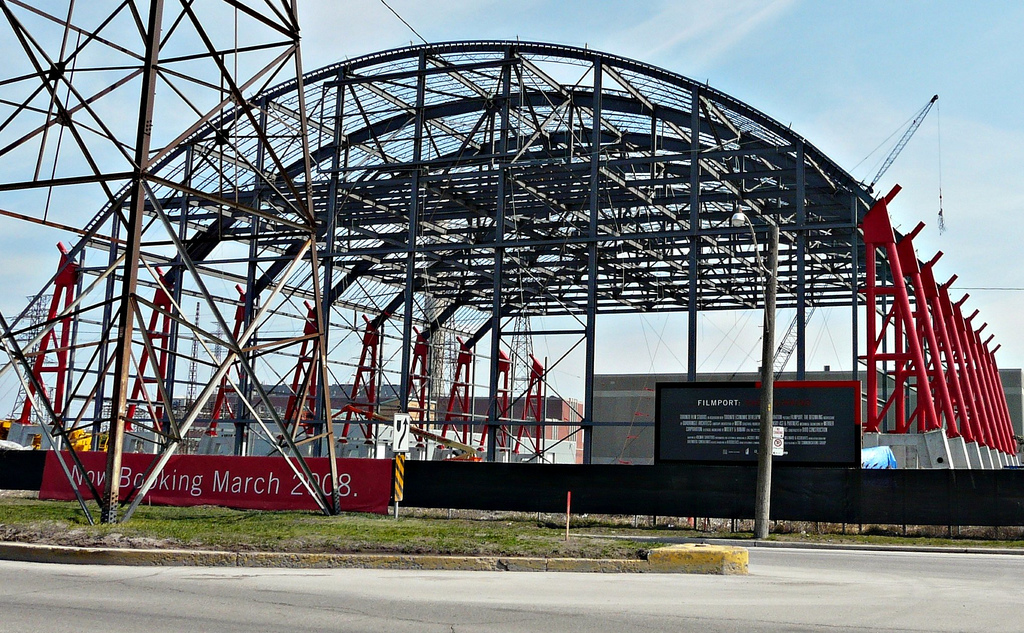
The Mega Stage under construction in 2008

The project covers 4.5 hectares (11 acres) of land in the Port Lands area of Toronto, a former industrial area, that is already home to a number of smaller studios. The Port Lands site was originally a brownfield site owned by Imperial Oil, and required considerable cleanup prior to reuse.

Initial work on the complex began in August 2006.

In June 2009, the studio entered into a comprehensive sales and marketing agreement with the Pinewood Studios Group, resulting in the facility being renamed Pinewood Toronto Studios.

Pinewood Toronto Studios was constructed to be a "green" facility with a number of environmental considerations.

In March 2018, Bell Media reached a deal with the UK-based Pinewood studios group, the City of Toronto government, and several holdings companies to purchase a controlling stake in the studio. As part of the deal, Bell Media announced that an additional 170,000 square feet of sound stages would be built at Pinewood Toronto to ease scarcity of production space in Toronto.

== Stages and facilities ==
The 11-hectare lot features seven purpose-built sound stages and one converted warehouse, ranging from 10,000 square feet (930 m^{2}) to 46,000 square feet (4,300 m^{2}). The largest sound stage, called the Mega Stage, is more than 46,000 square feet (4,300 m^{2}) and until 2016, was the largest purpose-built sound stage in North America.

In May 2024, it was announced one of the studios sound stages would be named "The Star Trek Stage", on which the television series Star Trek: Discovery and the film Star Trek: Section 31 were shot. In January 2025, another sound stage was named "The Norman Jewison Stage" in honor of the filmmaker.

=== Expansion ===
In November 2020, the company reported that an expansion has commenced, with a plan of adding over 200,000 square feet to the campus. The announcement specified that the expansion would "include five new sound stages (totaling 102,000 square feet), 58,000 square feet of office and support space, and 15,000 square feet dedicated to a mill shop and workshop". When the work is finished, the Toronto location will offer a total of 16 sound stages.
