= Hi-5 series 4 =

Hi-5
- Series 4
- Starring: Kellie Crawford; Kathleen de Leon Jones; Nathan Foley; Tim Harding; Charli Robinson
- No. of episodes: 45

Release
- Original network: Nine Network
- Original release: 1 July – 30 August 2002

Season chronology
- ← Previous; Series 3 Next → Series 5

The fourth series of the children's television series Hi-5 aired between 1 July 2002 and 30 August 2002 on the Nine Network in Australia. The series was produced by Kids Like Us for Nine with Kris Noble as executive producer.

== Cast ==
=== Presenters ===
- Kellie Crawford – Word Play
- Kathleen de Leon Jones – Puzzles and Patterns
- Nathan Foley – Shapes in Space
- Tim Harding – Making Music
- Charli Robinson – Body Move

== Episodes ==
No. overall	No. in series	Title	Song of the Week	Theme	Original release date
136	1	"Garden"	Going Out	Outside	1 July 2002
Nathan combines a collection of skipping ropes to create a picture of a flower. Charli skips with an imaginary skipping rope. Kathleen plants five pots of flowers outside in a colourful pattern. Charli pretends to be a seed growing into a flower. Tim sings a Spanish song to explore how an egg grows into a tadpole, and then becomes a frog. Charli jumps and swims like a frog and a duck. Kellie and Chats prepare a garden salad using food from their vegetable patch. Charli pretends to be a cob of corn growing in the garden. Sharing Stories: Charli tells a story about a boy (Nathan) who visits his grandfather's garden and meets a magical talking scarecrow (Tim), lorikeet (Kathleen), and a fairy (Kellie).
137	2	"Beach"	Going Out	Outside	2 July 2002
Nathan practises surfing in preparation for a day at the beach. Charli practises throwing and catching an imaginary frisbee. Tim explores the musicality of the waves at the beach while painting a picture of the sea. Charli pretends to jump over waves at the beach. Kellie and Chats discover things starting with S while sitting on the sand, from sandcastles to starfish. Charli puts on sunscreen before heading to the beach. Kathleen sorts her beach equipment into groups of colours. Charli plays on the sand and looks for shells before going for a swim. Sharing Stories: Kellie tells a story about a forgetful family (Charli, Nathan, Kathleen, and Tim) who arrive for an outing at the beach and unpack their belongings from the car.
138	3	"Outdoor Games"	Going Out	Outside	3 July 2002
Kellie and Chats play a skipping game with a rope. Charli jumps over a snaking rope on the ground. Tim plays a game of musical rounds on stepping stones outside with the rest of Hi-5. Charli jumps across the flower designs on the floor. Kathleen sets up an obstacle course outside using the garden equipment. Charli completes an outdoor obstacle course. Nathan plays a game of skittles using different balls to knock over a stack of tin cans. Charli pretends to be a tin can being knocked over by a ball. Sharing Stories: Kathleen tells a story about a boy (Nathan) who builds a sandcastle, and imagines that a princess (Kellie) lives there, waiting for a royal guard (Tim) to rescue her from a dragon (Charli).
139	4	"Great Outdoors"	Going Out	Outside	4 July 2002
Kellie and Chats observe animals outside while sitting in their treehouse. Charli searches for animals while bushwalking. Nathan installs an outdoor water feature in Charli's space. Charli performs a rain dance. Tim goes camping in the bush and listens to the sounds of nature around him. Charli sets up an indoor cubby house for camping. Kathleen builds a pretend shell to help her move around like a snail. Charli pretends to be a snail and an elephant. Sharing Stories: Nathan tells a story about a girl (Kathleen) who goes on a camping holiday with her mother (Kellie), where she meets a turtle (Charli) and a fellow camper (Tim), who both show her how they sleep outside.
140	5	"Outside Living"	Going Out	Outside	5 July 2002
Kathleen works as a ranger and goes on patrol in a national park. Charli acts as a ranger helping a hurt bird. Nathan goes on an African safari and discovers different animals along the way. Charli adventures in the Congo rainforest. Tim climbs a mountain and listens to the echo of his voice at the summit. Charli plays a copycat game with Tim matching her movements. Kellie and Chats paddle a canoe in search of a crocodile. Charli pretends to paddle into crocodile country. Sharing Stories: Charli tells a story about a silly pair of explorers (Tim and Kellie) who challenge themselves to find the silliest town in Australia, where they meet the mayor (Nathan) and a kangaroo (Kathleen) along the way.
141	6	"Hi-5 Fair"	Celebrate	Around Us	8 July 2002
Nathan works in a stall at a fete selling glasses of different shapes and colours. Charli tries on different shoes from a fete stall. Tim runs a carnival game which measures the dynamics of the player's singing. Charli relaxes after a big meal at the fete. Kathleen works at a stall selling items and clothes from faraway countries. Charli hides behind a handheld fan. Kellie and Chats sell lemonade made with freshly squeezed lemons. Charli plays a game of bowls using oranges. Sharing Stories: Kellie tells a story about a family of ants (Tim, Charli, Kathleen, and Nathan) who visit the grounds of a school fete in the hope of finding some crumbs to eat, before getting stuck in fairy floss.
142	7	"Fruits and Vegetables"	Celebrate	Around Us	9 July 2002
Nathan dresses up as a scarecrow to and protect his vegetable garden from birds. Charli tries to scare away some birds. Kellie and Chats make pesto sauce to be served with pasta. Charli identifies mystery fruits using only the sense of touch. Kathleen cuts a passion fruit and a custard apple into pieces for a snack. Charli performs a dance inspired by the fruit salad. Tim sings to the plants in his garden in before using them to make an Asian salad. Charli eats an imaginary dinner with different cutlery. Sharing Stories: Kathleen tells a story about a boy (Tim) who plants a tomato seed, which soon becomes a plant (Kellie) after growing under the sun (Charli) and a rain cloud (Nathan).
143	8	"Around the World and Celebrations"	Celebrate	Around Us	10 July 2002
Tim plays an Indian sitar and celebrates musical instruments from all around the world. Charli dances to flamenco music. Nathan decorates a picture of the Earth to celebrate its wonders. Charli sings about the world using sign language. Kathleen prepares decorations and a game for Chats's birthday party. Charli choreographs a dance to match a birthday song. Kellie celebrates Chats's birthday party with some surprise guests. Charli tries to hit open a piñata. Sharing Stories: Tim tells a story about two girls (Charli and Kellie) who prepare to attend a wedding with their mother (Kathleen), but are magically turned invisible by a leprechaun (Nathan) before they leave.
144	9	"Dancing and Costumes"	Celebrate	Around Us	11 July 2002
Kellie and Chats dress up in colourful costumes for a Brazilian carnival parade. Charli practises dancing the Brazilian samba. Nathan performs some Aboriginal dance movements that represent different Australian animals. Charli pretends to be a brolga dancing gracefully in the wetlands. Tim plays a gong from China and makes music using the pentatonic scale. Charli manoeuvres a long Chinese dragon costume for a dance. Kathleen dances to different music from around the world while wearing matching costumes. Charli and Nathan perform a Greek dance. Sharing Stories: Nathan tells a story about four different handbags (Kathleen, Charli, Kellie, and Tim) who live in a shop window and wait to be purchased.
145	10	"Animals"	Celebrate	Around Us	12 July 2002
Kellie pretends to be a frog from Jamaica who befriends Chats. Charli pretends to be a cobra snake. Kathleen wears a kanga from Africa and makes her own with painted animal footprints. Charli pretends to be a yodeling cow. Tim makes music with singing cats from around the world. Charli pretends to be a Siamese cat and a Persian cat. Nathan uses old clothes to dress up as animals from different habitats around the world. Charli moves like a creeping fox. Sharing Stories: Charli tells a story about a baby rhinoceros (Tim) who struggles to find his balance due to the horn on his head, and seeks help from his mother (Kellie) and two tickbirds (Kathleen and Nathan).
146	11	"Inventions"	Give it a Go	Ideas	15 July 2002
Tim builds a kennel for his dog which contains ways of making music inside. Charli makes up a dance for a dog. Nathan invents a "mood-ometer" which displays the particular emotions he may be feeling. Charli adds a goofy face to the mood-ometer and acts out feeling silly. Kellie invents a musical mat which allows her to dance along to three different styles of music. Charli dances like a floating cloud. Kathleen invents a clock which helps her keep track of the tasks she has to do during the day. Charli hangs her washing in time with the ticking of a clock. Sharing Stories: Charli tells a story about a girl (Kathleen) who creates a robot (Tim) to help with the cleaning, and assist her parents (Kellie and Nathan).
147	12	"Imagination"	Give it a Go	Ideas	16 July 2002
Kathleen sings opera while matching the pitches of musical glasses filled to different levels. Charli pretends to be an opera singer. Kellie and Chats visit an aquarium in their imagination. Charli pretends to be a fish. Tim finds an over-sized music staff and learns the notes that occupy its spaces, which spell "face". Charli imagines stepping up and down a music staff. Nathan pretends to be an astronaut landing on the Moon and playing a space ball game with a Moon creature. Charli imagines playing football on the Moon. Sharing Stories: Kathleen tells a story about two children (Kellie and Nathan) who find a seesaw at a park with their mother (Charli), and imagine travelling to a land full of zig-zag shapes with a whimsical host (Tim).
148	13	"Find Any Way"	Give it a Go	Ideas	17 July 2002
Kellie tries on hats worn for different jobs, and tries to decide which would be the best job for her. Charli plays a guessing game with hats for different jobs. Tim pretends to be a Tyrannosaurus rex making music with prehistoric landmarks. Charli dresses up as a dancing dinosaur. Nathan collects a group of special items to send to a friend living overseas. Charli practises different ways of greeting people using her hands. Kathleen choreographs a dance and uses symbols to represent the movements on instruction cards. Charli practises a cha cha dance using footprint outlines. Sharing Stories: Nathan tells a story about a wobbly wall (Charli) who comes together with three other walls (Kellie, Tim, and Kathleen) to form a stable building.
149	14	"Creativity"	Give it a Go	Ideas	18 July 2002
Nathan builds two-dimensional sculptures using different items from around the house. Charli goes for a ride on an imaginary bicycle. Kathleen creates a picture of a fish using blocks. Charli tries to have a rest on a pile of cushions. Tim plays a rhythm on the bongo drums, while the rest of Hi-5 each add a new percussion beat to the song. Charli forms a conga line with the rest of Hi-5. Kellie and Chats make up a story about a pig using pictures to tell the tale. Charli builds a house of cards by stacking playing cards. Sharing Stories: Tim tells a story about a man (Nathan) who tries to build a table, which his tools (Charli, Kellie, and Kathleen) later fix when it turns out wobbly.
150	15	"Adventure"	Give it a Go	Ideas	19 July 2002
Nathan goes on a pretend deep sea diving adventure and discovers sunken treasure. Charli pretends to be a dolphin diving in the deep sea. Kellie and Chats search for animals that start with the letter A. Charli pretends to be an albatross. Tim imagines visiting the Land of the Brass Blowers, where they speak using brass instruments. Charli mimes the actions of playing different instruments. Kathleen prepares a dress-up game for Kellie, with the pieces of an adventuring outfit hidden in her wall. Charli practises swimming strokes. Sharing Stories: Kellie tells a story about a boy (Tim) who dresses up as his favourite superhero for a birthday party planned by his mother (Charli), before his friends (Nathan and Kathleen) arrive wearing the same costume as him.
151	16	"House"	Inside My Heart	Inside	22 July 2002
Kathleen wonders if a mouse is in the house and searches for a way to hide her fruit. Charli pretends to be a mouse scurrying around the house. Kellie and Chats sort pieces of furniture into the most suitable rooms of a dollhouse. Charli demonstrates her bathroom routine. Nathan explores how a washing basket could become a home for different animals. Charli pretends to be a snail with a washing basket for a shell. Tim imagines having a house full of furniture that provide interesting noises for a song. Charli tidies up her room. Sharing Stories: Kellie tells a story about a girl (Charli) who struggles to join in with the other children at preschool (Kathleen, Nathan, and Tim) until she proposes that they all play together.
152	17	"Special Places"	Inside My Heart	Inside	23 July 2002
Kellie relaxes in a hammock and thinks of other words that start with H. Charli tries to fit herself underneath a table. Kathleen creates an imaginary beach indoors with pretend sand and sea. Charli moves around in a silly way. Tim plays instruments by himself in his special place. Charli stretches on the floor. Nathan turns a cardboard box into a special place and fills it with his favourite items. Charli dresses her hands up in a glove and a mitten. Sharing Stories: Nathan tells a story about a girl (Kellie) who dreams of travelling down a jungle river on her bed, where she meets a hippopotamus (Tim), a toucan (Kathleen), and a jungle girl (Charli).
153	18	"Body"	Inside My Heart	Inside	24 July 2002
Nathan works as a doctor and attends to his first patient, Tim. Charli claps to a rhythm and follows along with her tap dancing feet. Kathleen finds a new and creative way to exercise the muscles in her body. Charli explores how joints help her arms and legs to bend. Kellie is given a necklace as a present from Chats, with a photograph of herself inside. Charli feels anxious as she tries to complete a long jump. Tim collects different sounds made by the body and compiles them into a song using a recording machine. Charli pretends to be the rumble of a stomach. Sharing Stories: Charli tells a story about a professor (Tim) and a doctor (Kathleen) who decide to investigate an ancient tribe of people called the "Yuck Yucks", and find out why they were inclined to laugh a lot.
154	19	"Head"	Inside My Heart	Inside	25 July 2002
Kellie and Chats explore the different types of ears that a range of animals have. Charli stomps her feet to loud music. Tim uses symbols to help Kellie and Nathan write down the music playing through their minds, before they play the song on their imaginary instruments. Charli actualises the dance moves from inside her head. Kathleen uses a thermometer to measure her temperature when she is sick with a cold. Charli gives Kathleen a massage to make her head feel better. Nathan plays a video game in which he is transported into his computer to become a superhero. Charli practises a taekwondo routine. Sharing Stories: Tim tells a story about three teeth (Charli, Kellie, and Nathan) from inside a mouth, who work together to remove a piece of spinach (Kathleen) which is stuck between them.
155	20	"Natural World"	Inside My Heart	Inside	26 July 2002
Nathan explores how volcanoes erupt, using cooking ingredients to recreate the lava. Charli moves around like bubbling water. Kathleen pretends to be a joey living inside a kangaroo pouch. Charli bounds around the bush like a kangaroo. Tim finds termites inside the branch of an old gum tree, which they have hollowed out to look like a didgeridoo. Charli pretends to be a magical bush creature. Kellie and Chats find a cicada shell on a tree. Charli pretends to be a cicada breaking out of its shell. Sharing Stories: Kathleen tells a story about a slug (Kellie), who is left out of a game with the other insects (Tim, Nathan and Charli) when they believe she isn't capable of participating, before they later find a way to appreciate her talents.
156	21	"Trying Something New"	One Step Forward	Can Do	29 July 2002
Nathan uses his hands and feet to do things they wouldn't usually do. Charli paints a picture using her feet. Kathleen practises juggling with soft balls and hacky sacks. Charli bounces and catches a basketball. Kellie helps Chats read a book by herself for the first time by acting out the story. Charli re-enacts the movements from a rhyming story. Tim leads a rehearsal for the Hi-5 marching band while trying to play all of the instruments at once. Charli tries to play the drums for the first time. Sharing Stories: Tim tells a story about a girl (Charli) who tries to learn the difference between left and right, with the help of her family and friends (Kathleen, Nathan, and Kellie).
157	22	"Asking for Help"	One Step Forward	Can Do	30 July 2002
Nathan asks Tim to assist him as he builds a teepee, using a sheet to wrap around bamboo poles. Charli and Kathleen practise for a three-legged race. Kathleen makes up a story about a sock puppet using props to tell the tale. Charli uses a sock puppet to spell a word in the air. Tim asks the rest of Hi-5 to help him play the instruments for his new song. Charli gets her two hands to work together and clap. Kellie helps Chats become a racing car driver using a cardboard box as her racing car. Charli practises cartwheeling. Sharing Stories: Kathleen tells a story about a girl (Kellie) who decorates her Christmas tree with a little drummer boy (Tim), an angel (Charli), and a miniature Santa Claus (Nathan), who come alive and help her choose where to place them.
158	23	"In a Different Way"	One Step Forward	Can Do	31 July 2002
Nathan becomes a magician when he uses the same shapes to create different pictures. Charli makes different shapes with her body while stretching. Tim tries to work out how to play a pretend harp with rainbow strings, that the rest of Hi-5 create for him. Charli dances while wearing slippers. Kathleen decorates two cakes with matching patterns of fruit for her friends who are twins. Charli tries to carry a piece of cake without dropping it. Kellie feels angry after dropping a cake she baked, and finds ways to calm herself down with Chats. Charli moves around in a grumpy way. Sharing Stories: Kellie tells a story about a boy (Nathan) with a messy bedroom, who is encouraged by his father (Tim) to find a fun way to clean it, which leads him to transform his room into an amusement park with his sister (Kathleen).
159	24	"I Can Do Anything"	One Step Forward	Can Do	1 August 2002
Kellie and Chats do the cancan and discuss the names that other dances have. Charli dances with high kicks and jumps. Tim plays funky punk music in his space, but is not sure if the rest of Hi-5 will enjoy it too. Charli plays punk music on an imaginary electric guitar. Kathleen uses problem solving to complete different fix-it jobs. Charli stretches to ease her stiff shoulder. Nathan imagines travelling around the world while exploring artifacts from different countries. Charli pretends to explore the jungle and swim under the sea. Sharing Stories: Charli tells a story about a girl (Kellie) who decides to teach her dog (Nathan) to do tricks, and trains him with the help of her family (Tim and Kathleen).
160	25	"I Can Do What I've Said"	One Step Forward	Can Do	2 August 2002
Kellie repurposes Nathan's old superhero costume as a new one for herself. Charli wears a cape which gives her super powers. Kathleen crafts a farm made of paper when her toy ducks go missing. Charli sings about a pig who is stuck in the mud. Tim is challenged by Kellie to make up a song about anything that she chooses. Charli makes up a dance about breakfast. Nathan tries to build a tower using colourful boxes of different sizes. Charli makes her hands look like a house. Sharing Stories: Nathan tells a story about a girl (Kathleen) who meets a talking rabbit (Tim), who tries to grant wishes for her, along with her friend (Charli) and sister (Kellie).
161	26	"Moves and Workout"	E-N-E-R-G-Y	Energy	5 August 2002
Kathleen feels cold and tries to find her winter clothes as Jup Jup takes them away. Charli uses her energy to skip with a rope. Nathan paddles down an imaginary river in a pretend boat. Charli practises her tennis moves. Tim uses his energy to play the trombone after having a nap. Charli feels flat and is cheered up by her friendship with Tim. Kellie teaches Chats about static electricity using a balloon to pick up torn pieces of paper. Charli scrubs the floor using "elbow grease". Sharing Stories: Tim tells a story about a herd of ordinary cows (Kellie, Kathleen, and Nathan) who grow tired of their usual routine, and are inspired by an energetic new cow (Charli) to find a new groove.
162	27	"Renewable Energy"	E-N-E-R-G-Y	Energy	6 August 2002
Nathan explores the wind energy needed to power windmills. Charli moves her arms around like a windmill. Kathleen finds ways to use magnetic power and static electricity to play a fishing game. Charli imagines that her hand is a magnet. Tim invents a solar-powered robot which plays musical instruments. Charli pretends to be a robot that is powered by the sun. Kellie and Chats build a weather vane to test the direction of the wind. Charli goes for a stroll beneath the sun. Sharing Stories: Kathleen tells a story about a girl (Charli) who builds a snowman (Nathan), and witnesses it come to life while her father (Tim) is busy working.
163	28	"Machines"	E-N-E-R-G-Y	Energy	7 August 2002
Kellie and Chats pretend to pilot a helicopter around the world. Charli moves her arms like the rotors of a helicopter. Nathan explores springs of different sizes and bounces on a pogostick. Charli moves her body like a spring. Tim repairs a bicycle and makes music with it in the process. Charli imagines riding a bicycle while lying on the ground. Kathleen builds a miniature train by finding materials to use as wheels and place on axles. Charli drives an imaginary car. Sharing Stories: Nathan tells a story about a slow snail (Tim) who journeys to a caryard for bugs (Kellie, Kathleen, and Charli) to buy a new car to help him travel faster.
164	29	"House"	E-N-E-R-G-Y	Energy	8 August 2002
Nathan finds a way to wear all of his cleaning items at once to help him clean his space. Charli pretends to be a washing machine. Kathleen designs a curtain to hang across her window. Charli pretends to be a sunflower growing in the sunlight. Tim explores how a metronome uses its energy to help him keep to the beat of music. Charli exercises her fingers to the beat of a metronome. Kellie and Chats explore the energy that is required to use a toothbrush. Charli runs a pretend hair salon. Sharing Stories: Kellie tells a story about a lonely picture frame (Nathan) living in the room of a girl (Kathleen), who searches for other collectable items (Tim and Charli) to befriend.
165	30	"Food"	E-N-E-R-G-Y	Energy	9 August 2002
Kellie and Chats make energy biscuits and decorate them with sultanas spelling the word "energy". Charli performs an energetic dance. Kathleen dresses up as a rabbit and searches for carrots to eat. Charli pretends to be a rabbit. Tim bakes a cake and thinks about the ingredients he needs to make music. Charli makes imaginary porridge. Nathan challenges the rest of Hi-5 to dance in a way which represents different fruits and vegetables. Charli moves like a pumpkin and a celery stick. Sharing Stories: Charli tells a story about three pieces of jelly (Nathan, Kathleen, and Tim) from a grocery store, who come to life to compete in a contest, which is judged by a slice of cheese (Kellie).
166	31	"Babies"	Move It!	Patterns	12 August 2002
Nathan explores the shape of a shark egg and its spiraling pattern. Charli pretends to be a shark trying to scare the fish. Kellie and Chats play a game with egg, baby chick, and hen costumes. Charli remembers when she had chicken pox. Tim pretends to be a baby magpie learning to warble. Charli tries to whistle for the first time. Kathleen pretends to be a honey bee checking on the baby bee eggs in the hive. Charli plays a guessing game about fruit. Sharing Stories: Charli tells a story about a young girl (Kathleen) who learns to become a good sibling to her new baby brother (Nathan), with the help of her parents (Kellie and Tim).
167	32	"Recycling"	Move It!	Patterns	13 August 2002
Tim repurposes old tin cans and cookware as a drum kit. Charli sorts lids of different sizes to their matching jars. Nathan uses rubbish to craft a junkyard puppet. Charli pretends to be a puppet made of recycled clothes. Kathleen tidies up her space and sorts out her rubbish. Charli recycles an old song; "Move Your Body", by changing its lyrics. Kellie and Chats hold a garage sale and sell items starting with G. Charli puts on her reading glasses. Sharing Stories: Charli tells a story about an aging dining table (Kellie), who worries that her owners (Nathan and Kathleen) will replace her when her legs begin to wobble.
168	33	"Routines"	Move It!	Patterns	14 August 2002
Kathleen prepares for a weekend trip away and makes a list to remember the things she needs to pack. Charli pretends to brush her hair, fingernails and shoes. Tim organises visual cues to remind himself of his morning routine and when to practise playing the saxophone. Charli stretches her muscles before dancing. Nathan practises relaxing tai chi exercises. Charli performs tai chi stretches. Kellie and Chats read a story about a baby bunyip as part of their bedtime routine. Charli demonstrates her different sleeping positions. Sharing Stories: Kathleen tells a story about the prince (Tim) of a palace, who is rude to his servants and friends (Nathan, Charli, and Kellie), and fails to respect them, leading them to feel unappreciated.
169	34	"Nature Cycles"	Move It!	Patterns	15 August 2002
Tim uses a snare drum to replicate the sounds of ocean waves rolling onto the beach. Charli pretends to be a wave rolling into the shore. Kellie and Chats use dress-ups to explore the colour and movements of the ocean during a storm. Charli uses her arms to represents rolling waves out at sea. Kathleen uses a globe and a lamp to explore how daytime and nighttime is created around the world. Charli spins a hula hoop around her arms. Nathan explores how the moon changes shape and demonstrates its different shapes. Charli pretends to be a moon in its changing phases. Sharing Stories: Kellie tells a story about an astronaut (Nathan), who invites two aliens (Tim and Nathan) from outer space to visit him and his daughter (Charli) on Earth for a dinner party.
170	35	"Pictures"	Move It!	Patterns	16 August 2002
Kellie and Chats receive a postcard from a friend in New Zealand, and talk about the meaning of "Aotearoa". Charli dances using poi originated with the Māori people of New Zealand. Tim hears a musical rhythm and imagines visiting a city where the rhythm is continuously repeated. Charli pretends to be a post officer delivering the mail while moving to a rhythm. Kathleen follows four instruction cards to perform a dance pattern. Charli claps a rhythm using her hands. Nathan creates a pattern using paintings of hand prints and foot prints. Charli creates kaleidoscope patterns in the air using her fingers. Sharing Stories: Nathan tells a story about four shoes (Charli, Kellie, Kathleen, and Tim) living in a wardrobe who rehearse for a performance together.
171	36	"My Special Things"	Hand in Hand	Teamwork	19 August 2002
Nathan practises bush dancing in the shape of a square along with Kellie, Kathleen, and Tim. Charli practises a bush dance. Kathleen and Nathan work together to make lamingtons. Charli stirs an imaginary mixture with a wooden spoon. Tim pretends to be a magician and practises a special magic trick. Charli performs a magical disappearing trick. Kellie and Chats explore alliteration while talking about a little ladybird. Charli explores the difference between the wings of a ladybird, a chicken, and an eagle. Sharing Stories: Kathleen tells a story about a girl (Charli) who spends time playing with her new doll (Kellie), leading her old toys (Nathan and Tim) to feel neglected.
172	37	"Games"	Hand in Hand	Teamwork	20 August 2002
Kellie completes her soccer training inside on a rainy day, while Chats acts as her coach. Charli practises her soccer skills and competes in a game against Kellie. Nathan invents a guessing game involving freezing in silly statue poses. Charli plays musical statues and dances in a silly way. Tim and Kathleen play a musical game where they must sing in opposite ways to each other. Charli explores opposite movements. Kathleen and Kellie use playing cards to build houses of cards like pyramids in the desert. Charli makes diamond shapes with her fingers and body. Sharing Stories: Tim tells a story about three yellow pencils (Kellie, Charli, and Nathan) colouring a drawing together, who reject the help of a blue pencil (Kathleen), until they realise that they need her help.
173	38	"Memories"	Hand in Hand	Teamwork	21 August 2002
Kellie shows Chats her memory book and reminisces about when she was a baby. Charli pretends to be a baby, dancing and crawling around. Tim writes a song about feeling happy and asks the rest of Hi-5 how his music makes each of them feel. Charli sings about feeling proud and happy to be herself. Kathleen sorts photographs of herself on different sporting teams, to display in a special frame. Charli and Kathleen practise playing hockey. Nathan practises tying his shoelaces on an oversized shoe. Charli ties a bow around her toy bear. Sharing Stories: Kellie tells a story about a letter box, where a parcel (Charli), a telephone bill (Kathleen), a birthday greeting card (Nathan), and a postcard (Tim) tell each other stories about where they each have come from.
174	39	"Jobs"	Hand in Hand	Teamwork	22 August 2002
Kathleen tries to fix a broken wooden chair and asks Kellie to help her. Charli pretends to paint a chair. Nathan and Tim dress up as clowns and prepare a silly performance together for a party. Charli pretends to be a clown practising silly movements. Tim and the rest of Hi-5 make music with tools while crafting noisy ratchet instruments. Charli and Tim perform a cheer to support a sports team. Kellie and Chats use different tools to help with the gardening. Charli tries to reach a flower at the top of a tall lattice. Sharing Stories: Nathan tells a story about three statues (Charli, Kellie, and Kathleen) attending a school for statues who learn how to stand still under the guidance of their teacher (Tim).
175	40	"Making a Movie"	Hand in Hand	Teamwork	23 August 2002
Kellie writes a screenplay for an adventure movie starring Hi-5 and includes a part for Chats. Charli choreographs a dance to include in the film. Kathleen prepares the costumes and props that will feature in the movie. Charli practises acting by pretending to be a signpost. Tim works as a composer and creates music and sound effects for the film. Charli and the rest of Hi-5 think of poses to represent adventurers. Nathan prepares the set for the Hi-5 movie by moving and staging the props. Charli acts like a sneaky adventurer. Sharing Stories: Chats tells the story of the Hi-5 movie, in which two adventurers (Tim and Kellie) go on a quest in search of a rare platypus (Kathleen) with the help of a wombat (Nathan), but are intercepted by a sneaky villain (Charli) who tries to find it herself.
176	41	"Colours"	Reach Out	Finding Out	26 August 2002
Nathan paints a room divider and makes discoveries while mixing the colours. Charli matches colours with her feelings. Kellie and Chats prepare a fruit salad in the shape of a rainbow, using fruit of different colours. Charli peels and eats an orange. Tim plays rainbow coloured pan pipes and explores other pan pipes made of a range of materials. Charli dances with rainbow coloured scarves. Kathleen paints a picture of the sea and the sky, and wonders why they are both coloured blue. Charli pretends to go skiing down a mountain. Sharing Stories: Charli tells a story about a boy (Tim) who builds a sandcastle at the beach, and befriends three crabs (Kellie, Nathan, and Kathleen) in the process.
177	42	"About and Around Me"	Reach Out	Finding Out	27 August 2002
Tim seeks the help of a jazz piano to improve his jazz dancing. Charli finds her groove by dancing to jazz music. Kathleen searches for creatures in the backyard and counts her discoveries. Charli imagines how the combination of a butterfly, grasshopper and beetle might move. Kellie and Chats use loose items from around the house to invent a game with a miniature soccer field. Charli invents a game which combines different movements. Nathan pretends to be a starfish in a rock pool. Charli pretends to be a scuttling crab. Sharing Stories: Nathan tells a story about a young star (Kellie) who is yet to shine, which leads her to seek advice from the other stars (Charli and Kathleen) and the keeper of the night sky (Tim), to help her begin to sparkle.
178	43	"Experiments"	Reach Out	Finding Out	28 August 2002
Kathleen finds a way to make her own bubble mixture to use for blowing bubbles. Charli plays with balloons. Tim pretends to be a scientist making music using items from around the house. Charli makes her bed. Nathan makes different shapes with clay using a potter's wheel. Charli crafts a model of a cat using play dough. Kellie and Chats follow directions to make a bath bomb for a fizzing water effect. Charli dries herself with a towel after having a bath. Sharing Stories: Kathleen tells a story about three cookbooks (Tim, Nathan and Kellie) on a kitchen bench who try to devise a plan to stop the book on the end from falling over, before they meet a bookend (Charli).
179	44	"Cleverness"	Reach Out	Finding Out	29 August 2002
Kathleen pretends to explore an island bay in a boat and navigate her way towards the lighthouse. Charli acts like a sailor carrying out her duties at sea. Kellie and Chats conduct an experiment to determine which liquid is the heaviest; syrup, oil, or water. Charli pretends to be a rubber duck floating on the water. Tim explores all of the different sounds that he can make with his mouth and his voice. Nathan mixes up the body parts of a toy with movable parts. Charli wonders what it would be like if her body parts performed different roles. Sharing Stories: Tim tells a story about a girl (Charli) who finds a shy baby dinosaur (Kathleen) in the garden and invites it to stay inside the house with her parents (Kellie and Nathan).
180	45	"Creativity"	Reach Out	Finding Out	30 August 2002
Nathan goes on an underground mining adventure in search of precious rocks and gemstones. Charli pretends to be a miner crawling through a tunnel. Kathleen imagines being granted three wishes while Jup Jup acts as her genie. Charli practises her magical genie movements. Tim plays an African double-headed drum and sings the words "dance crane dance" in the Zulu language. Charli leaps around her space. Kellie and Chats play a guessing game involving acting out different words. Charli performs a rain dance. Sharing Stories: Kellie tells a story about three elves (Charli, Tim, and Kathleen) who offer to deliver the presents for Santa (Nathan) when he falls sick on Christmas eve.

== Home video releases ==
Series	DVD Title	Release Date (Region 4)	Songs of the Week	Ref.
4	Let's Celebrate	VHS: 21 October 2002; DVD: 9 September 2004	Celebrate; Hand in Hand; Inside My Heart	
4	Surfing Safari	VHS / DVD: 2 April 2003	Going Out; Give it a Go; Reach Out	
4	Hi-Energy	VHS / DVD: 13 August 2003	E-N-E-R-G-Y; One Step Forward; Move It!	

== Awards and nominations ==
List of awards and nominations received by Hi-5 series 4
Award	Year	Recipient(s) and nominee(s)	Category	Result	Ref.
APRA Screen Music Awards	2003	Chris Harriott, Lisa Hoppe (for "Celebrate")	Best Music for Children's Television	Nominated	
Logie Awards	2003	Hi-5	Most Outstanding Children's Program	Nominated	
