= Hi-5 series 1 =

Hi-5
- Series 1
- Starring: Kellie Crawford; Kathleen de Leon Jones; Nathan Foley; Tim Harding; Charli Robinson
- No. of episodes: 45

Release
- Original network: Nine Network
- Original release: 12 April – 11 June 1999

Season chronology
- Next → Series 2

The first series of the children's television series Hi-5 aired between 12 April 1999 and 11 June 1999 on the Nine Network in Australia. The series was produced by Kids Like Us for Nine with Kris Noble as executive producer.

== Production ==
Creator Helena Harris initially conceived Hi-5 in 1998 along with co-producer Posie Graeme-Evans, developing the series as entertainment for preschoolers. During her time living in England, Harris realised that children are the same around the world, and was inspired to create a children's series which would appeal globally. The creators believed that pre-schoolers were rapidly maturing beyond programs such as Here's Humphrey, and discovered that most children learned from shows which incorporated movement and song. They saw the need for television which was "life affirming", and believed that a child's imagination could be activated by television of good quality. The name of the series was derived from the high five gesture.

Harris and Graeme-Evans pitched Hi-5 to the Nine Network through Kids Like Us, their joint independent production company. After auditions for the cast were held in June 1998, a pilot was produced, and shown to a test audience. No changes to the format were made after this test. The original cast consisted of Kellie Crawford (née Hoggart), Kathleen de Leon Jones, Nathan Foley, Tim Harding, and Charli Robinson, who were aged between 19 and 25 at the time of the series' airing. After being commissioned, the first full series began production in October, and went to air on Nine in 1999. The series was produced for US$20,000 to US$30,000 for each episode.

== Cast ==
=== Presenters ===
- Kellie Crawford – Word Play
- Kathleen de Leon Jones – Puzzles and Patterns
- Nathan Foley – Shapes in Space
- Tim Harding – Making Music
- Charli Robinson – Body Move

== Episodes ==
No. overall	No. in series	Title	Song of the Week	Theme	Original release date
1	1	"Fantasy"	Ready or Not	Games	12 April 1999
Kellie and Chats pretend to be astronauts walking on the Moon. Charli pretends to be an imaginary Moon bunny. Nathan explores how wings of different shapes help him to move in different ways. Charli makes the shape of a butterfly with her hands. Tim, Kathleen, Kellie, and Charli replicate sounds that can be heard at the beach and in the city. Charli pretends to be drivers of different city vehicles answering emergency calls. Kathleen pretends to be a pirate searching for treasure on an island. Charli digs for buried treasure. Sharing Stories: Nathan tells a story about four friends (Kellie, Tim, Charli, and Kathleen) who travel to different imaginary lands on a magical flying carpet.
2	2	"Outside"	Ready or Not	Games	13 April 1999
Kathleen packs a bag of items to take to the beach while Jup Jup provides ideas for games to play. Charli jumps across rocks to get to the water at the beach. Tim plays a beach ball game with Kellie and Nathan. Charli throws an imaginary beach ball in the air. Kellie teaches Chats about nocturnal animals, and shows her natural items that come from the rainforest. Charli pretends to be an owl flying in the night. Nathan uses shapes to make pictures of sea animals. Charli floats and swims in the ocean. Sharing Stories: Tim tells a story about four friends (Kellie, Kathleen, Nathan, and Charli) who play an outside game with a parachute.
3	3	"Rainy Days"	Ready or Not	Games	14 April 1999
Kellie and Chats play a game using sounds that can be heard on a rainy day. Charli uses tap shoes to make the sound of rain. Nathan and Kathleen perform magic tricks, finding different ways of using shapes. Charli drives imaginary vehicles around a line of cones. Tim makes up a singing game involving tempo and dynamics. Charli plays hopscotch. Kathleen and Kellie create rules for a game that Jup Jup has set up for them. Charli plays a miniature game of hopscotch using her fingers. Sharing Stories: Kathleen tells a story about four friends (Tim, Kellie, Charli, and Nathan) who make a pretend indoor beach on a rainy day.
4	4	"Physical"	Ready or Not	Games	15 April 1999
Nathan looks for a shape in his space that he can hide behind. Charli plays a hiding game. Kathleen tries to find a way to knock over a group of skittles at once. Charli pretends to be a skittle. Tim challenges Kellie and Nathan to guess which animal sound he is making with his keyboard. Charli pretends to be a hippopotamus. Kellie and Chats match hats to the members of Hi-5 they belong to. Charli tries on different-coloured hats. Sharing Stories: Tim tells a story about a boy (Nathan), who struggles to find a game he is good at, with his friends (Kellie and Kathleen), help him find something new to play.
5	5	"Silly Day"	Ready or Not	Games	16 April 1999
Nathan turns himself into a cone puppet on an imaginary string. Charli spins around and makes circle shapes. Kellie and Chats dress up as a pair of twin clowns named Stumble and Bumble. Charli plays a game with her reflection in a mirror. Tim, Kellie, and Nathan compete in the Silly Musical Olympics, with Kathleen acting as the judge. Charli challenges her fingers and toes to compete in a race. Kathleen creates a pinball game. Charli pretends to run a race against herself. Sharing Stories: Kellie tells a story about a group of animals living in a zoo (Charli, Nathan, Tim, and Kathleen), who play a silly game together once the zookeeper is asleep.
6	6	"Dimensions"	You and Me	You, Me	19 April 1999
Tim finds a music box, and dances to the song it plays with up and down movements. Charli moves her body in and out of a hoop. Kellie tries to use Chats's new door to enter her space, but finds out that it is too small to move through. Charli moves her fingers up and down, like a jack-in-the-box. Nathan displays his flower pots on high and low walls of blocks. Charli does a dance with big steps and little steps. Kathleen blows up balloons and explores how they inflate and deflate. Charli holds balloons at different heights in the air. Sharing Stories: Kathleen tells a story about a fig tree (Tim) who seeks help from a blue bird (Charli) and some children (Nathan and Kellie), to feel taller and more important.
7	7	"Language, Cultures, and Countries"	You and Me	You, Me	20 April 1999
Kellie gives Chats a sulu from Fiji, and teaches her how to say hello in Fijian. Charli says a poem about the Sun and the Moon. Tim learns how to say hello in different languages. Charli uses her body and voice to say hello to a friend. Nathan makes a picture of houses with different styles, using felt shapes. Charli imagines opening doors to enter an igloo. Kathleen practises counting to five in Japanese. Charli counts by moving her hands, feet, and head. Sharing Stories: Kellie tells a story about a polar bear (Kathleen) who travels to the city, and learns about the city language from a cat (Tim) and its friends (Charli and Nathan).
8	8	"Seasons"	You and Me	You, Me	21 April 1999
Tim plays different kinds of music for each of the four seasons. Charli pretends to be the summer sun, rising in the morning and setting at night. Kellie and Chats pretend to be the seasons of autumn and spring, while finding the differences between the two. Charli plays with autumn leaves. Nathan creates a winter thunderstorm picture using cardboard shapes. Charli paints a rainbow using an imaginary paintbrush. Kathleen sorts items from nature into the season they are found in. Charli tries to decide which is her favourite season. Sharing Stories: Nathan tells a story about a television weather reporter (Kellie), who reports a day of rapidly changing weather to the people watching (Charli, Kathleen, and Tim).
9	9	"You and Me"	You and Me	You, Me	22 April 1999
Tim and Kathleen each clap the same rhythm in a different way. Charli creates a clapping and tapping rhythm using her hands and feet. Kellie and Chats discuss how their differences make them unique. Charli uses hats to dress up as people with different jobs. Nathan makes a footprint path, and compares the size of his feet with Kathleen's. Charli follows the path of handprints on the floor of her space. Kathleen prepares food for a picnic, with a platter of fairy bread and fruit. Charli sings about wearing fruit on her hat. Sharing Stories: Kellie tells a story about a red kangaroo (Charli) who gets a bindi stuck in her paw, and asks the strong dingo and emu (Tim and Nathan) to remove it, but is ultimately assisted by a clever bush mouse (Kathleen).
10	10	"Wonderful"	You and Me	You, Me	23 April 1999
Kellie and Chats compare a pumpkin and watermelon, and find the differences between the two. Charli pretends to lift up imaginary pumpkins from the ground. Nathan compares items of different and similar sizes and colours. Charli plays a game where she freezes when the music stops playing. Tim makes a puppet with a special difference; it can make music, like a shaker. Charli uses her body to shake the musical puppets. Kathleen makes a picture of a pond, using different-coloured fish shapes. Charli pretends to go fishing. Sharing Stories: Charli tells a story about a creek creature (Nathan), who enlists his animal friends (Tim, Kellie, and Kathleen) to tell him what he looks like, when he can't remember for himself.
11	11	"I Would Like to Be"	Dream On	Imagine	26 April 1999
Kellie and Chats imagine being circus performers, and practise walking the tightrope. Charli pretends to walk across an imaginary tightrope. Nathan uses shapes to make a crown and pretend he is a king. Charli pretends to be a jack-in-the-box. Tim imagines being as small as a mouse, and seeing instruments as much larger than himself. Charli changes her body from tall to small, and tries to decide which she likes best. Kathleen becomes a puppeteer and puts on a sock puppet show. Charli pretends to be a puppet on a string. Sharing Stories: Nathan tells a story about a girl (Kathleen), who puts on a fantasy puppet show starring mischievous magic puppets (Charli, Kellie, and Tim).
12	12	"I Would Like to Go"	Dream On	Imagine	27 April 1999
Nathan explores a pretend Congo jungle and rows down the river. Charli pretends to be a drum and plays a jungle beat. Kellie and Chats learn about the Flamenco dance from Spain. Charli does some flamenco dancing. Tim imagines sailing down a river while singing a rowing song. Charli pretends to paddle down a river in a boat. Kathleen the clown works on a balancing act while Jup Jup secretly helps her clown around. Charli tries to juggle using scarves, socks, and clothes. Sharing Stories: Kellie tells a story about a girl (Charli), whose family (Tim, Nathan, and Kathleen) lend her some summer items to take on her holiday, which aren't exactly suited to her winter destination.
13	13	"I Would Like to Make"	Dream On	Imagine	28 April 1999
Nathan turns his broomstick into a friend called Bronnie, who likes to dance. Charli sweeps up some magic dust using Bronnie the broom. Kathleen looks around for her favourite hats while Jup Jup helps her turn her hat stand into a statue of a robot. Charli pretends to be a robot. Tim imagines what it would be like to make a music machine, with help from the rest of Hi-5. Charli plays an imaginary trombone. Kellie and Chats put on a play of their favourite story, Rapunzel. Charli swims to shore using backstroke. Sharing Stories: Kathleen tells a story about four friends (Charli, Kellie, Tim, and Nathan) who pretend to travel under the sea in an imaginary train.
14	14	"I Would Like to Say"	Dream On	Imagine	29 April 1999
Kellie teaches Chats how to say the Spanish word; "sombrero". Charli dances the sombrero rhumba. Tim imagines what it would be like to speak with musical sounds instead of words. Charli makes up movements to match a song. Kathleen measures herself on a height chart and tries to become the tallest member of Hi-5. Charli makes her body become tall, small and in between. Nathan receives a postcard from Bronnie who is holidaying in Broome, so he sends a message back to her. Charli pretends to be a broom, sweeping the floor. Sharing Stories: Kathleen tells a story about a new boy at school (Tim), who sings instead of talking, which helps him to make new friends (Kellie and Nathan).
15	15	"I Would Like to Change"	Dream On	Imagine	30 April 1999
Kellie and Chats imagine what it would be like to be fairies, as small as a petal from a potplant. Charli spins around. Nathan becomes a magician and makes a tower out of boxes. Charli plays a hiding game with her magician's cape. Tim pretends to use a magic box to change himself into different musical instruments. Charli pretends to be a clapper inside a bell. Kathleen finds a magic wand, which she hopes will help her clean up the mess in her space. Charli uses a wooden spoon to practise her magic wand movements. Sharing Stories: Tim tells a story about a worm (Nathan), who asks a wise owl (Kellie) to turn him invisible, so he can play tricks on his friends (Charli and Kathleen).
16	16	"Favourite Things"	L.O.V.E.	Love	3 May 1999
Kellie shows Chats her favourite piece of clothing from her childhood; her tutu. Charli stretches her body after dancing. Nathan paints a picture of a donut. Charli listens to the rhythm of her heartbeat. Tim and the rest of Hi-5 make music using shakers made of popcorn. Charli pretends to be a piece of popcorn by replicating the popping movements. Kathleen tries to decide which of her old toys she should give away. Charli tidies up her space. Sharing Stories: Kathleen tells a story about a boy (Nathan) who is granted a wish from a genie (Kellie), to become a box of donuts, before he begins to regret his decision.
17	17	"Pets"	L.O.V.E.	Love	4 May 1999
Kellie turns a balloon into a bee and asks Chats to guess what she has made. Charli pretends to be a balloon being blown up. Kathleen tries to decide which animal would be the most suitable for her to own has a pet. Charli imagines what it would be like to have an elephant and lion as a pet. Tim uses a magic piano, which plays animal sounds, to write a song for his dog. Charli dresses as a chicken and does a funky dance. Nathan builds a pet dog using cardboard boxes. Charli pretends to be a dog. Sharing Stories: Nathan tells a story about a turtle (Kathleen) who is afraid of the dark inside her shell, so asks her friends (Kellie, Tim, and Charli) for ideas on how to manage her fears.
18	18	"Tim's Birthday"	L.O.V.E.	Love	5 May 1999
Tim writes a special song to celebrate his birthday. Charli prepares some decorations for Tim's birthday party. Nathan makes a present for Tim using coloured dough. Charli tries to find a way to wrap a hug to give as a present. Kellie and Chats create a new game to play at the surprise party, which involves the words "stop" and "go". Charli plays a musical movement game, with stop and go actions. Kathleen wraps her present for Tim; a piano accordion. Charli draws heart shapes in the air. Sharing Stories: Kellie tells the story of Tim's surprise birthday party, where she and the rest of Hi-5 (Charli, Nathan, and Kathleen) give him their presents and celebrate.
19	19	"Family"	L.O.V.E.	Love	6 May 1999
Kellie teaches Chats how babies communicate after she has been babysitting. Charli makes movements to accompany a song about babies. Tim talks about how noisy his family can be, and asks the rest of Hi-5 to pretend to be his relatives. Charli splashes around in the bathtub. Kathleen looks through her box of memories from the beach, while Jup Jup turns her collections into a collage. Charli looks through her photo album, and practises making funny faces. Nathan makes a family using vegetables of different sizes. Charli imagines how a pumpkin would move: by rocking and rolling. Sharing Stories: Kathleen tells a story about a mother bunny (Charli), who finds a patch of green grass for her family (Nathan, Kellie, and Tim) to eat for breakfast.
20	20	"Silly Day"	L.O.V.E.	Love	7 May 1999
Kathleen wonders what it would be like to be an animal, so she dresses up as a silly imaginary creature to find out. Charli pretends to be a seal and tries to balance a ball. Nathan uses vegetables on forks to create a marching band. Charli marches on the spot and around in circles. Tim writes a silly song for his dog Jock, which the rest of Hi-5 mistakenly believe he has written about them. Charli the dog tries to get comfortable in her bed. Kellie dresses up in all of her favourite clothes to create a silly mixed-up outfit. Charli wears her favourite clothes in unusual places on her body. Sharing Stories: Nathan tells a story about a silly land where babies (Kellie and Tim) look after adults (Kathleen).
21	21	"Bodies Growing"	Grow	Grow	10 May 1999
Kellie and Chats wobble like plates of jelly. Charli moves her body with a wobbly jelly dance. Tim uses cookware from around his space as drums, and plays them softly and loudly. Charli uses her body to make drumming sounds. Nathan builds two box people, and explores how people can be short or tall. Charli stretches her legs and bends her body. Kathleen notices that her feet are growing, so she looks for a new pair of shoes. Charli notices that when she tap dances, it's like her feet are talking. Sharing Stories: Charli tells a story about two babies (Kellie and Tim), who make new friends (Nathan and Kathleen) as they grow up and change.
22	22	"Animals"	Grow	Grow	11 May 1999
After Kellie finds an egg that has fallen out of a nest, she and Chats imagine being birds teaching the baby inside how to fly. Charli pretends to be a bird spreading its new wings. Tim wonders how baby birds learn to sing, and joins a bird choir. Charli moves her body as if she is growing. Kathleen matches pictures of adult animals with their young, and discovers a picture of Jup Jup as a baby. Charli pretends to be a tadpole in a pond growing into a frog. Nathan explores how a chicken is formed inside an egg, and tries to work out which came first. Charli sings about different baby animals and what they grow into. Sharing Stories: Kellie tells a story about a grumpy bunyip (Tim) who lives under a bridge, and tries to stop the farm animals (Kathleen, Charli, and Nathan) from crossing, so he can sleep.
23	23	"Building"	Grow	Grow	12 May 1999
Kellie and Chats imagine building a house for Hi-5 to live in. Charli dresses in workwear and shifts bricks in order to build a wall. Tim builds himself a space where he can play music without disrupting anyone. Charli builds a tower using big boxes, and then knocks it down. Kathleen builds a miniature town, with a tall tower as a place to live. Charli pretends to mix concrete for a big brick building. Nathan talks about the city he lives in, and creates a map using felt shapes to show what his neighbourhood looks like. Charli goes on a pretend adventure climbing mountains and trekking through mud and jungle vines. Sharing Stories: Charli tells a story about a family (Tim, Kellie, Kathleen, and Nathan) who live in a small house, and decide to find a new place to live with more room.
24	24	"Plants"	Grow	Grow	13 May 1999
Nathan explores how a seed can grow into a flower with the help of sunlight and rain. Charli pretends to be a new flower unfolding its petals. Kellie and Chats try singing to their plants to help them grow. Charli does some work in her imaginary garden. Tim plays different kinds of music to help his sunflower grow. Charli moves her body like twisting vines, which grow in different ways. Kathleen plants a mushroom garden in the hope that fairies will visit. Charli gives her sunflowers a sprinkle of magic dust. Sharing Stories: Tim tells a story about two blossoming daffodils (Charli and Kellie) who meet a new red flower bulb (Kathleen), and a child (Nathan) who stops to appreciate them all.
25	25	"Silly"	Grow	Grow	14 May 1999
Nathan makes a cat costume with a cardboard box for the head. Charli dances the caterpillar conga. Kellie dresses up as an imaginary flower person, while Chats becomes a make believe plant person. Charli moves like the wind. Tim uses different instruments to make the sounds of growing movements. Charli thinks about how different sounds remind her of different things. Kathleen bakes bread, and watches the dough grow. Charli does a cheer for growing dough. Sharing Stories: Tim tells a story about a girl who lives in a snowy place (Kellie), and much to the surprise of her mum (Charli), builds an ice house to keep warm, with the help of some Arctic animals (Kathleen and Nathan).
26	26	"Faces"	Move Your Body	Bodies	17 May 1999
Kellie is given a face and hair makeover by Chats, who transforms Kellie to look exactly like herself. Charli pretends to be a stick of red lipstick. Nathan explores how everyone in Hi-5 has a different shaped head. Charli counts how many of each body part she has. Tim shows how music can change to match if he is happy or sad. Charli uses her hands to try and swat mosquitos. Kathleen arranges drawings of Hi-5 into a patterns. Charli exercises the muscles in her face by moving her mouth and eyes. Sharing Stories: Charli tells a story about a girl (Kellie) who doesn't like her freckles and tries to hide them, until her dad (Tim) helps her see why they're special.
27	27	"Arms and Legs"	Move Your Body	Bodies	18 May 1999
Kellie and Chats make a spider to place on a pretend web. Charli moves like different types of spiders. Kathleen compares prints of her feet when they were at different sizes as she grew up. Charli tap dances with her feet. Tim marches to the rhythm of music played on his guitar. Charli practises marching with military steps. Nathan uses a cardboard box to pretend he has a box-shaped belly. Charli moves her body like a press-and-release toy. Sharing Stories: Kathleen tells a story about a leprechaun (Tim) who wants to be tall, and asks his parents (Kellie and Nathan) for ideas of how he can grow.
28	28	"Inside and Outside"	Move Your Body	Bodies	19 May 1999
Kellie gets spots on her skin after eating too much chocolate, and rubs cream on them. Charli draws some imaginary spots and dots in the air. Tim uses instruments to make a dinosaur's rib cage with musical bones. Charli digs for imaginary dinosaur bones in the Earth. Nathan tries to find a space which is the right shape to relax in. Charli discovers the right way to use a hula hoop. Kathleen makes a sculpture of a face using her cupboards, which Jup Jup leads her to believe that eating food is like a real body. Charli tries to pat her head and rub her stomach at the same time. Sharing Stories: Nathan tells a story about a girl (Kathleen) who tries to find a space with enough room to dance in, where she won't disrupt her family (Kellie and Tim).
29	29	"Movement"	Move Your Body	Bodies	20 May 1999
Kellie does some exercise when Chats becomes her personal trainer. Charli jumps by bending her knees. Tim plays piano music that matches the movements of puppets on strings. Charli pretends to be a puppet on a string. Nathan uses a broom and a pool noodle to make different shapes. Charli tries to stretch up and reach the stars in the night sky. Kathleen tries to find a costume for a belly dancing song. Charli watches her stomach move in and out while she breathes. Sharing Stories: Tim tells a story about three friends (Kathleen, Nathan, and Kellie) who discover a magical hopscotch stone, which leads them on an imaginary adventure.
30	30	"Wonderful"	Move Your Body	Bodies	21 May 1999
Nathan uses cardboard tubes on his arms and legs to become a half-robot superhero. Robot Charli becomes confused when her wires are crossed. Kathleen uses different shapes of biscuit dough to create a gingerbread man. Charli pretends to be a gingerbread man being chased. Tim notices that his guitar has a body which looks like a person's, and tells a story about his musical instrument friends. Charli plays a bass guitar and a lead guitar. Kellie and Chats talk about skin and how people sweat on hot days. Charli puts on sunscreen to protect herself from the sun. Sharing Stories: Charli tells a story about a butterfly who forgets to collect food for a summer feast in the garden, and seeks help from her friends; a bee (Kathleen), fruit bat (Nathan), and possum (Tim).
31	31	"The World"	Living in a Rainbow	Colours	24 May 1999
Kellie brings Chats some colourful fruit when she is sick: a yellow mango and a red strawberry. Charli tries to let out a sneeze. Nathan uses seashells and items collected at the beach to paint a sea picture. Charli imagines being different coloured sea creatures. Tim gets ready to go to a party by dressing up in colourful clothes. Charli practises her morning routine. Kathleen arranges some bouquets of colourful flowers for the rest of Hi-5. Charli pretends to be a small sunflower growing. Sharing Stories: Tim tells a story about a tiger (Kellie) who can only see in black and white, and struggles to follow colourful directions that her animal friends (Charli, Kathleen, and Nathan) have given her to find her way to a party.
32	32	"Your World"	Living in a Rainbow	Colours	25 May 1999
Tim imagines the colourful things he would see from the top of a gum tree. Charli sings about the different colours inside her house. Kellie shows Chats some red sand from the Australian desert. Charli swims with different strokes at the beach. Nathan creates a flag for Hi-5, using different shapes and colours to represent each member. Charli waves two hand flags in a pattern. Kathleen makes a special picture of the world and its shapes from the grass to outer space. Charli watches clouds pass by while lying on the ground, and then pretends to be a cloud herself. Sharing Stories: Kellie tells a story about a mermaid (Charli) who has lost her favourite yellow shell, and seeks help from her sea creature friends (Nathan and Tim) to find it in the reef.
33	33	"Making and Mixing"	Living in a Rainbow	Colours	26 May 1999
Nathan experiments with mixing different food colours together in water. Charli pretends to be a drop of water in a rock pool. Kellie shows Chats a snapdragon and some other colourful flowers with interesting names. Charli sings "Flower Power". Tim mixes different coloured instruments together to make an orchestra of rainbow sounds. Charli moves in different ways for different colours. Kathleen paints a colourful picture of a park by mixing colours. Charli paints an imaginary picture using her hands. Sharing Stories: Tim tells a story about an artist (Nathan) who paints scenery in unusual colours, much to the surprise of passers-by (Kathleen and Charli) and an art critic (Kellie).
34	34	"Favourites and Feelings"	Living in a Rainbow	Colours	27 May 1999
Kellie brings Chats a colourful present when she is feeling grumpy and blue. Charli expresses her happy and grumpy moods with different movements. Nathan uses his favourite old blue clothes to create a blue outline of a person. Charli pretends to be a rag doll trying to move. Tim imagines becoming different colours and moving in a corresponding way. Charli pretends to be a banana jumping and bending. Kathleen uses long and narrow pieces of colourful old clothes to arrange a rainbow pattern. Charli arranges a rainbow pattern of colourful beads on a necklace. Sharing Stories: Kathleen tells a story about three friends (Charli, Tim, and Nathan) who play a game using all of their favourite coloured clothes.
35	35	"Wonderful"	Living in a Rainbow	Colours	28 May 1999
Kathleen gets ready for her little brother's birthday with a colourful cake and candles. Charli blows a feather across the floor. Nathan the artist paints a rainbow masterpiece. Charli uses thick and thin paintbrushes to paint an imaginary smiley face. Kellie and Chats get ready for sleep by looking at diamond stars in the night sky. Charli pretends to be a silver star. Tim pretends to journey to space in a silver spaceship while making silver star music. Charli imagines what life would be like on the silvery moon. Sharing Stories: Charli tells a story about a boy (Tim) who does the washing for his friends (Nathan, Kathleen, and Kellie), but accidentally leaves a red waistcoat in with the white clothes, which turns the washing pink.
36	36	"Seeing"	Five Senses	Senses	31 May 1999
Kellie and Chats look through a dark pair of sunglasses, and compare the lenses to their own vision. Charli plays a hiding game with a spotlight. Tim makes music using a koala on a gumtree, with up and down movements as a visual guide for the notes. Charli pretends to be a cockatoo flying around. Nathan uses two large spheres to create a pair of giant eyeballs. Charli practises winking and blinking. Kathleen decorates gloves with eyes to make puppets. Charli plays with finger puppets. Sharing Stories: Tim tells a story about a mermaid (Kellie) whose friends (Kathleen and Nathan) worry that she has poor eyesight, so they take her to an eye doctor (Charli) for a checkup.
37	37	"Hearing and Talking"	Five Senses	Senses	1 June 1999
Kathleen fixes a cupboard door and hears an echo when she taps with her hammer. Charli does some work with an imaginary hammer. Nathan explores the interesting types of ears that different animals have. Charli hops and jumps like different animals. Tim listens to the different stomping sounds that feet make, and how it can sound like they are talking. Charli counts how many different ways there are to walk. Kellie and Chats make shadows using a torch when the power goes out. Charli dances with her shadow. Sharing Stories: Kellie tells a story about four friends (Charli, Kathleen, Tim, and Nathan) who play a whispering game, where they must pass on a message by whispering.
38	38	"Tasting and Smelling"	Five Senses	Senses	2 June 1999
Kellie and Chats go on a picnic and try to figure out what sweet thing they can smell. Charli pretends to grow like a honeysuckle vine. Nathan explores the noses of different animals. Charli pretends to be an elephant using her trunk to smell. Tim makes music while exploring the smell of banana juice and peanut butter. Charli stirs an imaginary cake mixture. Kathleen sorts fruit and vegetables into colour groups before mixing them to make a salad. Charli pretends to pick apples from apple trees. Sharing Stories: Nathan tells a story about a boy (Tim) in a grumpy mood, who tries to spend some time alone, while his family (Kellie, Kathleen, and Charli) try to cheer him up.
39	39	"Touching"	Five Senses	Senses	3 June 1999
Kellie moulds a clay pot for Chats's flower, and describes the texture of the wet clay. Charli pretends to be a hippopotamus rolling around in mud. Kathleen completes a shape puzzle using only her sense of touch. Charli makes shapes using her hands and body. Tim uses touch to play instruments and become a one man band. Charli claps her hands and slaps her thighs. Nathan tries to guess which items are inside a box, by feeling them and not looking. Charli pretends to paint and sand the walls of an imaginary building. Sharing Stories: Nathan tells a story about a blind mouse (Kellie) who asks her mouse friends (Charli and Kathleen) to help her find a book written in braille.
40	40	"Wonderful"	Five Senses	Senses	4 June 1999
Kellie and Chats listen to the sound of the rain, and see a rainbow when the rain stops. Charli draws an imaginary rainbow with her hands. Tim and his animal friends make music in the musical gumtree. Charli the mouse tries to get to the cheese in a mouse trap. Nathan combines four of his favourite animals by dressing up as them all at once. Charli pretends to be an elephant, with its large ears and long trunk. Kathleen makes music with glasses of juice filled to different levels. Charli plays a giant piano with her feet. Sharing Stories: Kathleen tells a story about a mother pig (Kellie) who helps her son (Tim) discover what it would be like to live as a human, like their friend (Nathan).
41	41	"Outer Space"	In a Different Place	Time, Place	7 June 1999
Tim imagines what the Sun, the Moon, and shooting stars would sound like if they made noise. Charli pretends to be the Sun. Kathleen builds a spaceship using tin cans, to help her imagine flying to the Moon. Charli pretends to be a rocketship, blasting off and landing on the ground. Astronaut Nathan lands on the Moon and collects Moon rocks to take home. Charli pretends to walk on the Moon. Kellie and Chats sing goodnight to the stars and the Moon. Charli stretches and yawns to wake herself up for the morning. Sharing Stories: Nathan tells a story about three friends (Tim, Kellie, and Kathleen) who travel on their flying magic carpet to a land of clouds where they meet a cloud girl (Charli).
42	42	"Habitat and Home"	In a Different Place	Time, Place	8 June 1999
Nathan builds an indoor tent to relax in, using furniture from around his space. Charli jumps around inside a sleeping bag. Kathleen sorts a mixed group of nuts, bolts, and washers. Charli builds an imaginary bookshelf. Tim builds a music space for his dog, Jock. Charli takes her imaginary dog for a walk. Kellie shows Chats a noisy tap dance while Chats is trying to have some quiet time. Charli balances a book on her head. Sharing Stories: Kellie tells a story about a girl (Kathleen) who sets off to find an animal for a pet, meeting a tiger (Tim), octopus (Nathan), and dog (Charli) along the way, while learning about their homes.
43	43	"Underwater"	In a Different Place	Time, Place	9 June 1999
Nathan goes on an underwater adventure in a yellow submarine. Charli imagines what she might see looking through a submarine window. Kathleen decorates a fish tank with rocks and sea plants. Charli pretends to walk through water while wearing flippers. Tim makes underwater music and pretends to be a crab snapping its claws. Charli plays a crab claw rhythm using castanets. Kellie and Chats explore how hermit crabs search for new homes. Charli pretends to be a hermit crab scuttling from side to side. Sharing Stories: Kathleen tells a story about a whale (Tim) who is washed up on the beach, and helped by a family (Nathan, Kellie, and Charli) to return to the water.
44	44	"Place in Time"	In a Different Place	Time, Place	10 June 1999
Kathleen makes a picture of a face before using number shapes to turn it into a clock face. Charli pretends to be a clock. Nathan becomes a firefighter and travels in his fire engine to get to the site of a fire. Charli pretends to be a firefighter. Kellie follows the directions on a map to search for treasure that Chats has hidden. Charli follows a treasure map around her space. Tim imagines travelling back in time and meeting a caveman. Charli does a cavewoman dance. Sharing Stories: Tim tells a story about a girl from the past (Kellie) who invents a game to play along with her friends (Nathan, Charli, and Kathleen).
45	45	"Wonderful Fancy Dress Party"	In a Different Place	Time, Place	11 June 1999
Kellie and Chats get ready for the Hi-5 fancy dress party, both dressing up as something from outer space. Charli pretends to be a bunny bouncing on the Moon. Nathan puts together a superhero costume to wear to the party. Charli pretends to fly in the sky like a superhero. Kathleen makes party bags for the rest of Hi-5. Charli plays with balloons. Tim tries to find a costume for the party which is different to what everyone else will be wearing. Charli plays a balloon bouncing game. Sharing Stories: Charli tells the story of the fancy dress party, where the rest of Hi-5 help her find the perfect costume to wear.

== Home video releases ==
Series	DVD Title	Release date (Region 4)	Songs of the Week	Special features	Ref.
1	Move Your Body	VHS: June 1999; DVD: 19 February 2003 (Note: Move Your Body and Summer Rainbows were made available on DVD as part of a double release.)	Move Your Body; Ready or Not; L.O.V.E.	—N/a	
1	Summer Rainbows	VHS: 1999; DVD: 19 February 2003	Living in a Rainbow; Grow; Five Senses	—N/a	
1	Star Dreaming	VHS: 2000; DVD: 9 April 2002	Dream On; You and Me; In a Different Place	Audio commentary by Helena Harris (creator) and Helen Martin (early childhood advisor)	

== Awards and nominations ==
List of awards and nominations received by Hi-5 series 1
Award	Year	Recipient(s) and nominee(s)	Category	Result	Ref.
Logie Awards	2000	Hi-5	Most Outstanding Children's Program	Won	
