= Hi-5 series 2 =

Hi-5
- Series 2
- Starring: Kellie Crawford; Kathleen de Leon Jones; Nathan Foley; Tim Harding; Charli Robinson
- No. of episodes: 45

Release
- Original network: Nine Network
- Original release: 17 April – 16 June 2000

Season chronology
- ← Previous; Series 1 Next → Series 3

The second series of the children's television series Hi-5 aired between 17 April 2000 and 16 June 2000 on the Nine Network in Australia. The series was produced by Kids Like Us for Nine with Kris Noble as executive producer.

== Cast ==
=== Presenters ===
- Kellie Crawford – Word Play
- Kathleen de Leon Jones – Puzzles and Patterns
- Nathan Foley – Shapes in Space
- Tim Harding – Making Music
- Charli Robinson – Body Move

== Episodes ==
No. overall	No. in series	Title	Song of the Week	Theme	Original release date
46	1	"To Other Countries"	North, South, East and West	Adventure	17 April 2000
Kellie teaches Chats the names of different Italian foods when she delivers a pizza and gelato. Charli rolls out an imaginary lump of pizza dough. Nathan goes on a pretend adventure to Mexico and climbs a pyramid called the Temple of the Sun. Charli climbs up an imaginary mountain. Tim receives postcards which transport him and the rest of Hi-5 to Africa and Brazil, where they listen to different music from both places. Kathleen puts on warm black and white clothes for a trip to Antarctica, which leave her looking like a penguin. Charli skates across a frozen lake while looking for penguins on the ice. Sharing Stories: Charli tells a story about three friends (Nathan, Kellie, and Kathleen) who dress up in traditional clothes from Hawaii, Holland, and Russia, before travelling to a pretend land and meeting someone (Tim) who combines all three traditional garments.
47	2	"Around Your House"	North, South, East and West	Adventure	18 April 2000
Kellie and Chats imagine what it would be like if everything started with B. Charli notices a butterfly (Kellie) and tries to catch it. Tim imagines being as small as an ant (Kathleen) and as tall as an elephant (Nathan), examining the different dynamics of his voice at each size. Charli makes her body smaller and bigger. Nathan builds a cave using a table and adventures inside to meet a fierce dragon (Tim). Charli does a dance inspired by the dragon. Kathleen makes an energy drink to take on a trekking adventure with Kellie, before Jup Jup takes away some of the ingredients. Charli pretends to be a piece of bread in a toaster. Sharing Stories: Kathleen tells a story about two siblings (Nathan and Kellie) who try to transform their father (Tim) into an animal while practising magic tricks, before their spell backfires.
48	3	"Around Your Town"	North, South, East and West	Adventure	19 April 2000
Nathan becomes a postman and delivers packages to the rest of Hi-5 on his bicycle. Charli rides around town on an imaginary bicycle. Kellie builds a miniature city for Chats using alphabet blocks to create the buildings. Charli goes for a walk around Alphabet City. Tim and the rest of Hi-5 make music in the kitchen with dough and cookware. Charli pretends to be a machine used for making muffins. Kathleen uses problem solving skills to take a figurine on an adventure around a model town. Charli pretends to be a frog jumping around in the rain. Sharing Stories: Kellie tells a story about a sneaky magpie (Kathleen) who takes the shiny objects of three townspeople (Charli, Nathan, and Tim) to decorate her nest, before they devise a plan to reclaim their possessions.
49	4	"To the Universe"	North, South, East and West	Adventure	20 April 2000
Kathleen pretends to be a space cadet and inspects her gear before exploring the universe. Charli imagines walking on the Moon and lifting Moon rocks. Kellie shows Chats a picture of the Solar System, and adds a pretend planet named after Chats, where everything starts with ch. Charli moves around on the imaginary Planet Move-a-Lot. Tim, Kathleen, Nathan, and Kellie sing a song to remember the names of the planets in the Solar System. Charli imagines what it would be like to fly among the stars. Nathan travels to the Sun in a spaceship and passes the planets along the way. Charli pretends to be a rocket ship flying in space. Sharing Stories: Nathan tells a story about four friends (Charli, Kellie, Tim, and Kathleen) who look at the stars at night through a telescope, and imagine journeying through space and the universe.
50	5	"Underground"	North, South, East and West	Adventure	21 April 2000
Kellie and Chats interpret ancient Egyptian hieroglyphics inscribed on a rock. Charli does an Egyptian dance while dressed as a princess. Kathleen journeys underground through a hidden ancient tunnel in search of a diamond. Charli makes a diamond shape with her fingers. Tim pretends to dig to the centre of the Earth while working to a digging song with two earthworms (Kellie and Kathleen) and two wombats (Nathan and Charli). Charli digs with an imaginary shovel. Nathan crawls through a tunnel which leads to a rabbit warren. Charli pretends to be a rabbit in a warren. Sharing Stories: Tim tells a story about family of wombats (Kellie, Nathan, and Charli) living in a burrow and the youngest wombat (Kathleen) who, unlike her family, doesn't know to dig.
51	6	"Feeling Free"	Feelings	Feelings	24 April 2000
Nathan blows bubbles of different sizes and imagines floating inside one. Charli blows imaginary bubbles and tries to pop them. Kellie and Chats think of different movements to represent each of the seasons. Charli performs a dance with moves for the different seasons. Tim plays a piece of music on his guitar which makes him feel free while Kathleen and Nathan dance along. Charli takes off her shoes and moves her bare feet around. Kathleen displays photographs of herself, Charli and Kellie in a gallery and tries to keep the picture frames level. Charli swings on her hoop swing to feel happy and free. Sharing Stories: Charli tells a story about a grumpy kitten (Kathleen) who decides to free herself from her owner (Tim) and make her own breakfast, with the assistance of a dog (Nathan) and pig (Kellie).
52	7	"Inside Me"	Feelings	Feelings	25 April 2000
Kathleen tries to find a cure for her hiccups, and counts them as they occur. Charli attempts to paint while hiccuping, sneezing, and coughing. Kellie and Chats use a stethoscope to listen to their heartbeats. Charli notices how her heartbeat changes when she is moving around. Tim, Kellie, Kathleen, and Nathan use a tom-tom drum to replicate the sounds of their hungry stomachs, which sound like grumbling bears. Charli prowls around like a hungry bear searching for food. Nathan examines the colour of a watermelon and explores how its shape changes when it is cut into pieces. Charli explores the tastes and textures of imaginary watermelon and lemon. Sharing Stories: Tim tells a story about a rooster (Nathan) with a sore throat, who enlists the other animals on the farm; a horse (Charli), mouse (Kellie), and cow (Kathleen), to help him perform his morning crow.
53	8	"Feelings We Have"	Feelings	Feelings	26 April 2000
Kathleen searches for a creative way to keep herself warm on a cold day. Charli warms herself up by exercising. Nathan paints a cardboard cut-out of himself, choosing colours to represent the feelings associated with each body part. Charli performs different movements to show the way she feels. Tim plays different music on his guitar to illustrate the different feelings the guitar might have. Charli decides she is feeling "squoggly", a term to describe when she is unsure of her mood. Kellie asks Chats to help her fall asleep when she feels too energetic for bed. Sharing Stories: Nathan tells a story about a cricket (Tim) who feels sad when he discovers he can't make a chirping sound, and asks his insect friends; a bee (Kathleen), butterfly (Kellie), and praying mantis (Charli), to help him learn how to chirp.
54	9	"Showing Our Feelings"	Feelings	Feelings	27 April 2000
Nathan explores how a mouth can convey different emotions: by adding different-shaped mouths to four cartoon faces. Charli uses her face, hands, and feet to show that she is feeling happy. Kellie and Chats think of words that begin with the letter Q. Charli moves around in a silly way. Tim and the rest of Hi-5 sing together while they each add a silly sound to the song. Charli plays a hiding game. Kathleen decorates savoury biscuits with a cream cheese mixture. Charli makes pretend biscuits using coloured play dough. Sharing Stories: Kellie tells a story about a boy (Nathan) who feels shy when meeting his new neighbour (Tim), before their mothers (Charli and Kathleen) encourage the children to play with each other to ease their nerves.
55	10	"Animal Feelings"	Feelings	Feelings	28 April 2000
Kellie finds herself feeling grumpy, which leads her to stomp around like an elephant. Charli moves around like an elephant, stomping her feet. Kathleen hears a kookaburra laughing and tries to find the bird hiding in her space. Charli pretends to be a laughing kookaburra. Tim and the rest of Hi-5 wonder how animals feel when they make certain sounds. Charli pretends to be three types of horses; a pony, an old farm horse, and a galloping racehorse. Nathan thinks about how dogs and cats might feel when they move their tails in different ways. Charli stretches like a cat. Sharing Stories: Kathleen tells a story about a joey (Kellie) who, unlike the other kangaroos (Charli and Tim), finds that she can't sleep without her blanket, until a dingo (Nathan) gives her an idea for a new way to use it as a scarf.
56	11	"Jungle Animals"	So Many Animals	Animals	1 May 2000
Nathan pretends to be a black panther and explores other jungle cats that use the patterns on their bodies to hide. Charli pretends to be a jungle cat, prancing and stretching. Tim, Nathan, and Kellie make the sound of a lion's roar using cylinder tubes. Kathleen measures the length of a spiralling jungle python against a tree in the jungle. Charli swings across the jungle on the vine of a tree. Kellie and Chats read a book about elephants, and try to imagine living with a trunk for a nose. Charli pretends to be an elephant stomping through the jungle. Sharing Stories: Nathan tells a story about a lion (Tim) who rules as the king of the jungle, and a jungle mouse (Kathleen) who encourages him to learn how to dance, much to his dismay.
57	12	"Insects"	So Many Animals	Animals	2 May 2000
Kathleen imagines having six legs, like an insect. Charli pretends to be an ant carrying a crumb back to the nest. Kellie and Chats communicate in the language of a cicada by making drumming sounds on their tummies. Charli hears a cicada in her space and tries to find it. Tim and the rest of Hi-5 pretend to be different insects each making their own distinct sounds. Charli explores how bees, fleas, and ladybirds use their bodies to move around. Nathan pretends to be a hungry caterpillar, who spins himself a cocoon and transforms into a butterfly. Charli pretends to be a butterfly spreading its wings for the first time. Sharing Stories: Kellie tells a story about a girl (Kathleen) and her friend (Nathan) who discover a dragonfly (Tim) while searching for insects, leading her to dream about flying with another dragonfly (Charli).
58	13	"Farm Animals"	So Many Animals	Animals	3 May 2000
Nathan uses shapes and pictures to describe his family's farm and its animals. Charli goes for a ride around the farm on an imaginary horse. Kathleen cooks an omelette breakfast using eggs collected from chickens on the farm. Charli collects imaginary eggs from chickens in a barn. Tim plays musical cow bells at different pitches and accidentally calls a herd of cows. Kellie challenges Chats to guess the items she has brought back from her visit to the farm. Charli pretends to milk a cow. Sharing Stories: Charli tells a story about a duck (Kellie) who leaves her pond in the city to visit the farm, where she meets the animals; a duck (Tim), sheep (Nathan), and cow (Kathleen), and tries to adjust to the country sounds.
59	14	"Water Animals"	So Many Animals	Animals	4 May 2000
Kathleen thinks of a unique way to measure the length of a baby whale. Charli pretends to be a dolphin diving in and out of the ocean. Nathan decorates his pretend fish tank with sea creatures to remember his visit to the aquarium. Charli pretends to be a crab digging on the sand. Tim, Nathan, and Kathleen practise singing like a seal and making seal sounds. Charli tries to balance a beach ball on her nose like a seal. Kellie completes Chats's riddle about a seahorse and remembers the time she saw one on the beach. Charli jumps over waves at the beach. Sharing Stories: Tim tells a story about a whale (Nathan) with a large tail that the other whales (Kellie and Kathleen) make fun of, before the mermaid (Charli) encourages him to embrace his special feature.
60	15	"Australian Animals"	So Many Animals	Animals	5 May 2000
Kellie and Chats think of all the things that fruit bats do in the opposite way to people. Charli pretends to be a fruit bat flying in the night. Kathleen sets up a model of the outback featuring a variety of Australian animals. Charli pretends to be a kangaroo jumping around in the bush. Tim imitates the calls of different Australian birds while the rest of Hi-5 go bird watching. Charli thinks about the special features of different birds. Nathan paints a picture of the desert with different animal tracks on the sand. Charli pretends to be a snake in the desert. Sharing Stories: Kathleen tells a story about two ringtail possums (Tim and Nathan) who decide to stay awake for the whole day, and journey inside a human's house, where they encounter a child (Charli), before returning home to their mother (Kellie).
61	16	"Yesterday"	Special Days	Days	8 May 2000
Kellie tells Chats about a dream she had, in which she was chased by a rabbit. Charli practises skipping after dreaming that she was unable to. Nathan pretends to be a caveman remembering how he discovered the best shape for a wheel. Charli plays with a hula hoop. Tim and the rest of Hi-5 practise playing instruments they started learning the previous day. Charli tries to remember the moves of a new dance routine. Kathleen uses leftover food from the day before to prepare a noodle salad lunch. Charli makes an imaginary sandwich to build her strength. Sharing Stories: Nathan tells a story about a forgetful martian (Tim) who crash lands his spaceship at a picnic on Earth, and asks three friends (Charli, Kellie, and Kathleen) to help him remember what he needs to fuel his ship.
62	17	"Today"	Special Days	Days	9 May 2000
Nathan goes outside on a rainy day and dances in the puddles. Charli dances in the rain. Kathleen folds and matches pairs of colourful socks on her laundry day. Charli pretends to hang up her washing on an imaginary clothesline. Tim leads a "backwards day" for the rest of Hi-5, where the events of the day take place in a reversed order. Charli gets dressed for the day and puts her clothes on back to front. Kellie helps Chats to write a song for a special friend, before she learns that the song is about her. Charli writes the word "today" in the air. Sharing Stories: Kellie tells a story about four friends (Tim, Kathleen, Charli, and Nathan) who play in puddles of rain while wearing colourful rainboots.
63	18	"Tomorrow"	Special Days	Days	10 May 2000
Kellie follows Chats's advice and sings a special song to help calm her nerves before a big concert. Charli rehearses a new dance routine before a concert performance. Nathan feels cold, and wonders how things would be different if the weather was warmer. Charli acts out feeling tired, followed by feeling energetic. Tim and the rest of Hi-5 replicate the sounds that they're expecting to hear at an upcoming agricultural festival. Charli pretends to play in an imaginary jumping castle. Kathleen prepares a range of games and activities for a play date with a friend. Charli practises juggling. Sharing Stories: Charli tells a story about a girl (Kellie) who decides to play in her bedroom rather than with her brother (Tim), and leaves a mess in her room that her parents (Kathleen and Nathan) insist she'd clean up.
64	19	"Days of the Week"	Special Days	Days	11 May 2000
Kathleen uses a jigsaw puzzle to represent the days of the week, and tries to remember the missing day. Charli pretends to be the sun while twirling ribbons. Kellie packs her backpack for a weekend camping trip and shows Chats what she is taking with her. Charli packs her sleeping bag away to take camping with Kellie. Tim assigns a wind chime to each day of the week and asks Kellie how each sound makes her feel. Charli moves like a leaf being blown around by the wind. Nathan plans his week with a different physical activity for each day. Charli performs a different movement for each day of the week. Sharing Stories: Kathleen tells a story about a cat (Tim) with a special collar for each day of the week, who discovers that a mouse (Kellie) has borrowed one of his collars.
65	20	"Special Days"	Special Days	Days	12 May 2000
Kellie and Chats prepare a coop to welcome a special chicken visitor. Charli does a funky chicken dance. Nathan makes masks of different shapes to match the face shapes of himself and the rest of Hi-5. Charli makes faces showing different emotions. Tim plays music to represent daytime and nighttime, and celebrates the summer solstice with Kellie and Kathleen. Charli plays outside on a long summer day. Kathleen prepares to go moongazing and adjusts the length of her telescope to make it longer and shorter. Charli tries to keep a balloon in the air. Sharing Stories: Tim tells a story about a girl (Charli) who is granted magic running shoes from a genie (Kathleen), which allow her to keep up with her friends (Kellie and Nathan).
66	21	"Imaginary Friends"	Three Wishes	Wishes	15 May 2000
Nathan turns a beanbag into a pet and experiments with changing its shape. Charli sits on a beanbag and moves like one herself. Kathleen tries to discover the imaginary creature that might be making noises in her cupboard wall. Charli follows hand prints on the floor by moving in different ways. Tim tries to find a favourite old toy animal of his which has been lost. Charli plays and dances with her imaginary fairy friend. Kellie introduces Chats to her friend; an imaginary caterpillar ready to change into a butterfly. Charli pretends to be a caterpillar travelling to a party. Sharing Stories: Kathleen tells a story about a girl (Charli) who struggles to blow her nose, and creates an imaginary friend (Tim) to help her learn, so that she can impress her mother (Kellie).
67	22	"When I Grow Up"	Three Wishes	Wishes	16 May 2000
Nathan imagines being a pilot and flies a pretend helicopter to the mountains. Charli pretends to be a rescue helicopter. Kathleen becomes an inventor and creates a new ball game to play at parties. Charli moves like a small ball rolling around on the ground. Tim and the rest of Hi-5 share the careers they dreamed of pursuing as they were growing up. Charli pretends to be a hairdresser and practises on Kellie and Tim. Kellie and Chats observe the eruption of a model volcano, like volcanologists. Charli pretends to be a baby volcano with bubbling lava inside. Sharing Stories: Kellie tells a story about three friends (Kathleen, Nathan, and Tim) who use dress ups to show what they'd like to do when they grow up.
68	23	"Imaginary Places"	Three Wishes	Wishes	17 May 2000
Kellie and Chats create an imaginary planet named after Kellie, where everything starts with K. Charli gives hugs and kisses as a way of saying hello and goodbye. Nathan completes an obstacle course involving shapes, for an imaginary championship. Charli goes for a run around an imaginary obstacle course. Tim plays a Celtic harp, which transports him to a magical land with dancing leprechauns. Charli pretends to be a baby and explores how they move. Kathleen wishes to visit a world covered in patterns, where she solves a puzzle involving shapes. Charli imagines visiting a place where she can dance all the time. Sharing Stories: Nathan tells a story about a mountain goat (Kellie) who meets three clouds; a storm cloud (Tim), a snow cloud (Charli), and a fair weather cloud (Kathleen) while climbing up a mountain.
69	24	"Daydreams"	Three Wishes	Wishes	18 May 2000
Kathleen makes meringues, which remind her of fluffy white clouds floating in the sky. Charli uses her arms and legs to move like an eggbeater. Nathan daydreams of holidaying on a tropical island, and builds his own version of the island in his space. Charli pretends to row a sailboat around a tropical island. Tim creates instruments with items from around the house, which use vibrations to make sound. Charli twirls her baton at the front of an imaginary marching band. Kellie and Chats daydream of visiting the beach on a hot day, and imagine journeying under the water. Charli pretends to collect sea shells at the beach. Sharing Stories: Charli tells a story about a girl (Kathleen) who tries to find the best place to play her bagpipes, where the noise won't annoy her parents (Kellie and Tim) and baby brother (Nathan).
70	25	"What If?"	Three Wishes	Wishes	19 May 2000
Kellie accidentally wakes Chats up in the middle of her nap. Charli uses her movements to show her happy and energetic mood. Kathleen wonders what she could use to cut paper if scissors hadn't been invented. Charli makes scissor movements with different parts of her body. Tim and the rest of Hi-5 change a song by singing it in different ways. Charli dances with moves inspired by a fish. Nathan recalls a dream in which he was a piece of paper going on an adventure in the wind. Charli pretends to be a piece of paper being blown by the wind. Sharing Stories: Tim tells a story about a boy (Nathan) who is thrown a surprise party by his friends (Charli, Kellie, and Kathleen), which leads him to wish for a birthday lasting every day.
71	26	"Our Habitat"	It's a Party	Homes	22 May 2000
Kathleen builds a tall tower of housing units before changing the design of her creation. Charli arranges a row of pretend of houses and then builds a skyscraper. Nathan makes a model of a pond as a habitat for different water animals. Charli pretends to be a frog who doesn't like getting wet. Tim reenacts his family's morning routine in the bathroom. Charli dances around the bathroom while washing up. Kellie helps Chats prepare a room for her special visitor by recycling old materials. Charli sorts her rubbish into different groups for recycling. Sharing Stories: Tim tells a story about a girl (Kellie) from the city who meets a duck (Nathan) living by a pond, and takes him on an adventure around the city.
72	27	"On the Ground"	It's a Party	Homes	23 May 2000
Kathleen builds a pretend nest for a mother pig. Charli pretends to be a pig rolling in the mud. Kellie and Chats build a model ant nest using large cardboard boxes. Charli pretends to be an ant making its way through the tunnels of an underground nest. Tim uses music to explore how some animals live in nests up high, and others down low. Charli does a dance featuring up and down movements. Nathan pretends to be an eagle overlooking Kakadu National Park, where his nest sits high on a clifftop. Charli pretends to be a snake slithering along the ground and an eagle flying on the clifftops. Sharing Stories: Charli tells a story about a cloud (Kellie) who wishes for some quiet, but begins to feel lonely after she is separated from her brother (Nathan) and the other clouds; a windy weather cloud (Kathleen) and a storm cloud (Tim).
73	28	"Mobile Habitat"	It's a Party	Homes	24 May 2000
Nathan packs a miniature caravan with items to take on a holiday. Charli tows her caravan while driving an imaginary car. Kathleen makes a pizza to take as a picnic lunch on a bushwalk. Charli rolls her body like a rolled up piece of pizza. Tim and the rest of Hi-5 explore three different kinds of mobile houses; a sampan houseboat, a gypsy caravan, and a kangaroo's pouch. Charli pretends to float on the water in a sampan. Kellie shows Chats the special items she's packed in her backpack for a sleepover at Kathleen's. Charli tries to find a comfortable position to fall asleep. Sharing Stories: Nathan tells a story about a girl (Kathleen) who lives with her father (Tim) and twin sisters (Kellie and Charli) in a houseboat on the river, and seeks some time alone when she begins to feel overcrowded.
74	29	"Other Countries"	It's a Party	Homes	25 May 2000
Kellie dresses up as a nomad and tells Chats about her desert home. Charli pretends to be a nomad riding a camel through the desert. Kathleen walks through the African desert and waits for the stars to appear in the night. Charli tries to keep cool during the day, and stay warm at night. Tim plays an African mbira while he and the rest of Hi-5 learn how to say "hello" and "goodbye" in Swazi. Charli dances to African music. Nathan pretends to go skiing in Alaska. Charli pretends to be a penguin walking on ice in Alaska. Sharing Stories: Kathleen tells a story about a mermaid (Kellie) who adventures to the shore and tries to walk on land like the other humans (Tim, Nathan, and Charli).
75	30	"City and Country"	It's a Party	Homes	26 May 2000
Kathleen constructs a veranda to shade a miniature city house from the sun. Charli walks on stilts across the hot ground. Kellie pretends to be a city tomcat, while Chats becomes a cat from the country. Charli searches for her neighbour's cat. Tim makes music while building a fence for the paddock of a country farm. Charli pretends to measure and build a gate for a fence at the farm. Nathan uses a model town to explore the differences between the bustling city and the peaceful country. Charli drives an imaginary city firetruck, followed by a tractor in the country. Sharing Stories: Kellie tells a story about a girl (Charli) who struggles to adjust to life in the city with her parents (Kathleen and Nathan), until her friend from the country (Tim) visits and helps her feel more at home.
76	31	"Looking After Myself"	Mirror, Mirror	It's Me	29 May 2000
Kellie tries to find her lost jacket by retracing her steps leading up to when it disappeared. Charli retraces her steps as she walks across her space. Kathleen brushes her teeth before visiting the dentist. Charli smiles to show that she is feeling happy after brushing her teeth. Tim holds a meeting for the "hug club", where he and the rest of Hi-5 share new ideas for ways to hug someone. Charli gives hugs to her plush animal toys to make them feel better. Nathan explores the different brushes which he uses to look after himself. Charli sweeps the floor of her space with a broom. Sharing Stories: Nathan tells a story about a koala (Charli) who tries to nap in a gumtree during the day, while all of the other animals; a cockatoo (Kathleen), emu (Tim), and wombat (Kellie) are wide awake.
77	32	"My Place in the Universe"	Mirror, Mirror	It's Me	30 May 2000
Kellie and Chats use a map of Australia to explore different methods of transport. Charli pretends to be a plane travelling across the country, followed by a train and car. Nathan looks out into the planets and stars in space through a telescope. Charli pretends to be the sun rising in the morning. Tim meets some alien creatures from outer space and translates their languages while making music with them. Charli imagines how an outer space creature might use gestures to say different things. Kathleen assigns balls of different colours to each member of Hi-5, before she discovers a ball which represents Jup Jup. Charli throws and catches a beach ball. Sharing Stories: Tim tells a story about a unicorn (Charli) who struggles to find her place, when she feels like the other forest creatures; a gnome (Nathan) and two fairies (Kellie and Kathleen), don't appreciate her talents.
78	33	"My Body Inside"	Mirror, Mirror	It's Me	31 May 2000
Nathan dresses up as a skeleton and explores the bones that make up his body. Charli dances by moving the different parts of her body. Kathleen exercises with a skipping rope and stays hydrated by drinking water. Charli goes for a walk around Alphabet City. Tim, Kathleen and Nathan make musical sounds to replicate the noises their bodies make while eating. Charli pretends to eat an imaginary bowl of spaghetti. Kellie shows Chats an x-ray photograph of her hand, leading Chats to produce an x-ray of her own. Charli sings about her bones. Sharing Stories: Kathleen tells a story about a baby bird (Tim) who is afraid of leaving his nest, before his friends on the ground; a turkey (Nathan), donkey (Charli), and goat (Kellie), help him overcome his fear of flying.
79	34	"My Body Outside"	Mirror, Mirror	It's Me	1 June 2000
Kathleen tries to find a use for an undersized knitted vest that she receives in the mail from her grandmother. Charli puts on warm winter clothes for the cold weather outside. Tim puts his instruments aside and thinks of creative ways to make music with his body. Charli plays imaginary instruments by miming the actions. Nathan manipulates a flexible wooden doll and make different shapes with its body. Charli pretends to be a marionette puppet on a string, performing different actions. Kellie gives Chats some tender loving care to cure her headache. Charli exemplifies the places on her body where she has bumped herself. Sharing Stories: Kellie tells a story about a girl (Kathleen) who accidentally dirties her new winter clothes while playing with her animal neighbours; a goose (Nathan) and calf (Tim), against the orders of her mother (Charli).
80	35	"You and Me"	Mirror, Mirror	It's Me	2 June 2000
Nathan and Tim dress up as clowns using items from around the house. Charli dresses up in silly clothes for clowning around. Kellie and Chats decide it isn't a coincidence that they are both wearing the same skirt, but that it is because they are such good friends. Kathleen packs a basket of fresh fruit to take on a picnic with Kellie, before Jup Jup swaps the container of fresh fruit for an assortment of dried fruit. Charli sings about her dress which features a design of fruit patterns. Tim plays an ocarina as he sits on a branch of his favourite tree. Charli dances alongside her favourite sunflower plant. Sharing Stories: Charli tells a story about a dragon (Tim) who loves to knit, unlike his siblings (Nathan, Kellie, and Kathleen), who encourage him to join in with their fire-breathing antics outside of the cave.
81	36	"Machines That Carry People"	Robot Number One	Machines	5 June 2000
Nathan thinks of a way to carry the rest of Hi-5 to the beach when he realises that his car isn't big enough. Charli pretends to travel in a car and a train. Kellie and Chats imagine travelling underwater in a submarine. Charli pretends to be a submarine moving under the water. Tim, Nathan, and Kellie ride an imaginary roller coaster and replicate the sounds of the machine as they ride. Charli pretends to ride on a roller coaster and a merry-go-round at a fair. Kathleen uses boxes to build a machine that will transport her dolls from one place to another. Charli transports a box of shoes by pushing it around. Sharing Stories: Nathan tells a story about three townspeople (Charli, Tim and Kellie) who devise a plan to travel to the city in a sea plane: to retrieve a birthday present for their friend (Kathleen).
82	37	"Machines in the House"	Robot Number One	Machines	6 June 2000
Nathan invents a multifaceted machine to help with the cleaning jobs around the house. Charli moves like a tumble-dryer by circling clothes around in the air. Kathleen puts together the pieces of her vacuum to clean the spiderwebs off her cupboard doors. Charli cleans her space with an imaginary vacuum cleaner. Tim tests out his remote-controlled robots (Kellie, Charli, Nathan, and Kathleen), who complete chores around the house in his place. Charli pretends to be a robot assisting with the household chores. Kellie and Chats use an electric blender to make a banana smoothie. Charli spins around at different speeds to replicate the movements of a blender. Sharing Stories: Charli tells a story about a toaster (Tim) who feels neglected when the children of the house (Nathan and Kathleen) start using their new breadmaker (Kellie) in its place.
83	38	"Machines in the Country"	Robot Number One	Machines	7 June 2000
Nathan examines the engine of his tractor to ensure that it is functioning properly. Charli mimes the movements of different engine parts using her arms and legs. Kellie and Chats explore how a sugar cane harvester operates in the country. Charli pretends to be a machine that harvests sugar canes. Tim and the rest of Hi-5 recreate the process of a hay baler at work on a farm. Charli uses her body to represent the movements of a hay baling machine. Kathleen uses a blender to whip cream from milk produced on the farm. Charli collects crates of milk cartons from a factory to deliver back to the farm. Sharing Stories: Kathleen tells a story about a lighthouse (Kellie) who is distracted by a dolphin (Tim), leading a seagull (Charli) to assist her in redirecting her light back towards the ocean to guide a fisherman at sea (Nathan).
84	39	"Machines in the City"	Robot Number One	Machines	8 June 2000
Nathan demolishes a block tower and clears the building site for a new structure to be raised. Charli pretends to be a demolition crane bringing down a building. Kathleen operates the traffic lights for a model of the city and its roads. Charli follows the signals of the traffic lights while walking in the city. Tim uses a sound sampler to record sounds associated with the busy city lifestyle. Charli climbs the stairs of a tall city building before switching to an escalator. Kellie and Chats use a rope and pulley system to open the curtains for Chats's play about the city. Charli flies an aeroplane above the city. Sharing Stories: Nathan tells a story about a small city crane (Tim) whose services are rejected by a construction manager (Charli) because of his size, before he proves himself by rescuing an elephant (Kathleen) for the ringmaster of a circus (Kellie).
85	40	"Fun Machines"	Robot Number One	Machines	9 June 2000
Kathleen uses a pretend time machine to travel to different times throughout the day. Charli travels to the future and discovers a new style of fashion. Kellie helps Chats put together the pieces of a marble maze by following her instructions. Tim pretends to be a music machine while singing a song in different musical styles. Charli pretends to be a dance machine and dances along to different music in a variety of ways. Nathan tries to teach his robot dog to walk and move at different speeds. Charli teaches her imaginary robot dog to walk in different directions. Sharing Stories: Kellie tells a story about a girl (Kathleen) from the farm, whose family (Charli and Nathan) surprise her with a merry-go-round when her allergies prevent her from riding the family horse (Tim).
86	41	"Music From Around the World"	Feel the Beat	Music	12 June 2000
Nathan dances to Latin American music while playing a game of limbo. Charli dances under an imaginary limbo stick. Kellie shows Chats a steel drum from Jamaica and uses it to play reggae music. Charli dances in her own way to reggae music. Kathleen wears ankle bells and finger cymbals to dance to Indian music. Charli dances to traditional Indian music. Tim and the rest of Hi-5 explore rhythms involving syncopation, which sound like reggae beats. Charli pretends to play a percussive drum beat with different parts of her body. Sharing Stories: Charli tells a story about a group of friends (Nathan, Kathleen, Kellie, and Tim) who form a band together, but can't decide on a style of music to play.
87	42	"Styles of Music"	Feel the Beat	Music	13 June 2000
Kellie creates a life-size music box and sings different styles of music each time Chats opens it. Charli pretends to be a dancing ballerina from the inside of a music box. Tim counts along to the different metres of waltz music and blues rock. Charli dances the waltz with an imaginary partner. Nathan discovers a machine which plays music to accompany different styles of movement and dance. Charli tap dances beneath a spotlight. Kathleen tries to learn how to play a piano accordion from Germany. Charli and Kathleen practise a traditional German leg-slapping dance. Sharing Stories: Nathan tells a story about a Chinese paper dragon (Tim) who has a problem to participate in a parade to celebrate the New Year, before three children (Kellie, Charli, and Kathleen) help him prepare.
88	43	"Instruments"	Feel the Beat	Music	14 June 2000
Kellie cleans the cymbal from her drum kit while making music with her cleaning equipment. Charli polishes the floor by moving her feet in different ways. Tim, Nathan, and Kathleen explore the family of string instruments; the violin, cello, and double bass. Charli moves in different ways to music played by the string instruments. Kathleen crafts her own set of musical wind chimes using metal kitchen utensils. Charli pretends to listen to the sounds of different sized bells. Nathan paints patterns on a cardboard tube to replicate a didgeridoo from Australian Aboriginal culture. Sharing Stories: Tim tells a story about a group of animals; a cat (Kellie), dog (Nathan), and rat (Kathleen), who build musical instruments using rubbish from a junkyard, and are approached by a ferret (Charli) who asks to join their ensemble.
89	44	"Music and Sports"	Feel the Beat	Music	15 June 2000
Nathan prepares a song and dance for the opening ceremony of a Hi-5 multi-sport event. Charli rehearses a gymnastics routine before practising her swimming. Kellie and Chats carry out a workout regime to sustain their energy on a rainy day. Charli performs a workout routine for a rainy day. Tim and the rest of Hi-5 compete in a musical egg and spoon race while singing along. Charli pretends to juggle with three imaginary eggs. Kathleen exercises with different yoga poses inspired by animals. Charli practises the frog, bird, and ball yoga poses. Sharing Stories: Kellie tells a story about an African river bird (Kathleen) who motivates three other African animals; a hippopotamus (Nathan), crocodile (Charli), and lion (Tim) to work out by the river: by finding individual exercises to suit each of their bodies.
90	45	"Silly Music"	Feel the Beat	Music	16 June 2000
Nathan builds silly musical instruments from household items to play in a wild music band with Tim and Kellie. Charli plays imaginary instruments for a musical performance. Kathleen listens to the unusual sounds of her soda water while preparing a fruit juice drink. Charli pretends to be a fizzing drink. Tim, Nathan, Kathleen, and Kellie make up actions to match the silly words of a song. Charli performs the actions from Tim's silly song. Kellie challenges Chats to guess the names of the instruments she is playing by listening to their sounds. Charli plays a kazoo, slide whistle, and thumb cymbals. Sharing Stories: Kathleen tells a story about a boy (Nathan) who is invited to sing for his brother's band (Tim, Kellie, and Charli), but finds out that he can only sing at his best while he is in the bathtub.

== Home video releases ==
Series	DVD Title	Release Date (Region 4)	Songs of the Week	Special features	Ref.
2	Animal Adventures	VHS: 2000; DVD: 10 March 2004	So Many Animals; Special Days; North, South, East and West	—N/a	
2	Music Machine	VHS: 30 October 2000; DVD: 9 April 2002	Robot Number One; Mirror, Mirror; Feel the Beat	Audio commentary by Helena Harris (creator) and Helen Martin (early childhood advisor)	
2	Snow Party	VHS: April 2001; DVD: 3 August 2005	It's a Party; Feelings; Three Wishes	—N/a	

== Awards and nominations ==
List of awards and nominations received by Hi-5 series 2
Award	Year	Recipient(s) and nominee(s)	Category	Result	Ref.
Logie Awards	2001	Hi-5	Most Outstanding Children's Program	Won (Tied) (Note: Hi-5 was tied with Round the Twist (ABC TV))	
