= Hi-5 series 3 =

Hi-5
- Series 3
- Starring: Kellie Crawford; Kathleen de Leon Jones; Nathan Foley; Tim Harding; Charli Robinson
- No. of episodes: 45

Release
- Original network: Nine Network
- Original release: 11 June – 10 August 2001

Season chronology
- ← Previous; Series 2 Next → Series 4

The third series of the children's television series Hi-5 aired between 11 June 2001 and 10 August 2001 on the Nine Network in Australia. The series was produced by Kids Like Us for Nine with Kris Noble as executive producer. The series featured the 100th episode.

== Cast ==
=== Presenters ===
- Kellie Crawford – Word Play
- Kathleen de Leon Jones – Puzzles and Patterns
- Nathan Foley – Shapes in Space
- Tim Harding – Making Music
- Charli Robinson – Body Move

== Episodes ==
No. overall	No. in series	Title	Song of the Week	Theme	Original release date
91	1	"Flowers"	Rain Rain	Nature	11 June 2001
Kellie and Chats think of words that rhyme with "flower" and "rose". Charli recites a poem about a flower enjoying the sunlight. Kathleen dresses up in a bee costume to search for her missing flowers. Charli moves around like a bee collecting pollen from flowers. Tim starts a singing telegram business and delivers musical messages along with flowers. Charli delivers a message about flowers through sign language. Nathan paints a colourful picture of a flower bed using sponge brushes. Charli imagines how flowers would dance if they were able to move. Sharing Stories: Tim tells a story about a fairy (Kellie) living inside a sunflower, who adventures around the garden of a young girl (Kathleen), encountering a mother bird (Charli) and a helicopter (Nathan) before returning to her sunflower patch.
92	2	"Water"	Rain Rain	Nature	12 June 2001
Nathan works as a plumber and connects a pretend rainwater tank to water pipes. Charli pretends to wash her clothes using her hands. Kathleen picks sunflowers from her garden and waters a pot plant with some magic water. Charli relaxes in an imaginary swimming pool. Tim pretends to be a chimpanzee living in the jungle and performs a musical rain dance. Charli makes the sound of rain using body percussion. Kellie and Chats discuss the different words that can be used to describe water and rain. Charli washes a dolphin pool toy in the bathtub. Sharing Stories: Kathleen tells a story about a mermaid (Kellie) who develops a sunburn blister after refusing to wear sunscreen, against the advice of her friends (Charli, Nathan, and Tim).
93	3	"Earth"	Rain Rain	Nature	13 June 2001
Nathan designs a special garden as a place to rest. Charli plays with a pile of imaginary mud. Kellie and Chats name a toy bulldozer after a caterpillar to describe the way it moves along the ground. Charli moves like a bulldozer shoveling piles of dirt. Tim sings a song about a pig who gets stuck in the mud, while acting out the story with the rest of Hi-5. Charli pretends to be a piglet trying to resist the temptation of rolling in the mud. Kathleen prepares a garden salad while Jup Jup adjusts the sizes of her vegetables. Charli plants a variety of vegetables in an imaginary vegetable garden. Sharing Stories: Charli tells a story about a boy (Nathan) who goes on a digging expedition, where he encounters an earthworm (Kathleen), an antique Toby jug (Tim), and an ancient dinosaur bone (Kellie) underground.
94	4	"Sky"	Rain Rain	Nature	14 June 2001
Kellie and Chats use a portable fan to fly their kites inside. Charli pretends to be a kite while moving on roller skates. Kathleen presents the television weather report and chooses clothes for the different conditions. Charli pretends to be a bird flying to her nest in a summery breeze. Nathan stages a powerful storm performance with the rest of Hi-5 acting as clouds, rain, and thunder. Charli pretends to be a lightning bolt and uses her body to create powerful movements. Tim uses instruments and other items to replicate the sounds of the sky. Charli uses her body to move like a hurricane. Sharing Stories: Nathan tells a story about a prince (Tim) who visits two flowers (Charli and Katheen) in an enchanted garden, but fails to notice a shy rose bud (Kellie) until it gains the confidence needed to bloom.
95	5	"Trees"	Rain Rain	Nature	15 June 2001
Nathan paints pictures on pieces of bark to tell a story about a magical creature. Charli imagines becoming a magical tree creature who lives among the branches. Kellie shows Chats a library book that features real samples of tree leaves inside. Charli rakes and picks up the fallen leaves from a tree. Tim uses instruments made from wood to write a song about a tree. Charli rides on her hoop swing hanging beneath a tree. Kathleen explores different patterns found on trees experimenting with her own designs. Charli moves her body like trees of different shapes and sizes. Sharing Stories: Kellie tells a story about a boy from the farm (Tim) who picks the fruit from three trees (Kathleen, Charli, and Nathan) in the orchard, before deciding to find a way to make things more interesting.
96	6	"Mind and Body"	Boom Boom Beat	Get Fit	18 June 2001
Kathleen pretends to work as a doctor giving her patients medical checkups. Charli describes her feelings after a visit to the doctor. Nathan dreams of competing to become the strongest weightlifter in the world. Charli exercises her arms by lifting weights. Tim uses his body to represent the notes of a melody he has created in his mind. Charli paints an imaginary picture while dancing. Kellie and Chats learn the names for the muscles in their arms and legs, while demonstrating the movements with their own bodies. Charli explores the different ways the body uses the gluteus maximus muscle. Sharing Stories: Kellie tells a story about a young frog (Tim) who tries to learn to jump, while seeking the advice of his father (Nathan), a grasshopper (Kathleen), and a kangaroo (Charli).
97	7	"Rest and Relaxation"	Boom Boom Beat	Get Fit	19 June 2001
Kathleen relaxes while decorating hats as wrapping them as presents. Charli tries on different hats and moves in the way they each make her feel. Tim sings a lullaby to help his dog get to sleep. Charli pretends to be a lazy cat looking for something to do. Kellie follows Chats's instructions to cure her hiccups, with deep breathing exercises. Charli practises some deep breathing techniques to stop feeling fidgety. Nathan tries to find a way to relax by using music and dance. Charli dances to release her extra energy. Sharing Stories: Tim tells a story about an eldest girl (Charli) who stays awake on the night of her birthday as she struggles to contain her excitement, leading her younger sister (Kellie) and her parents (Nathan and Kathleen) to discover her asleep on her big day.
98	8	"Exercise"	Boom Boom Beat	Get Fit	20 June 2001
Nathan exercises with different ball sports, and tries to determine which is his favourite. Charli practises her sport skills with an imaginary ball. Kellie leads Chats in a workout at the park to help her feel re-energised. Charli does some leg stretches while laying on the floor. Tim rehearses with the Hi-5 marching band as they practise their movements. Charli practises marching while twirling a baton. Kathleen uses illustrated instruction cards to create her own exercise regime. Charli imagines how dogs would exercise. Sharing Stories: Charli tells a story about a boy (Nathan) who prefers to dance rather than play sport like his athletic friends and family (Kathleen, Tim, and Kellie), but decides to keep his hobby a secret.
99	9	"Food"	Boom Boom Beat	Get Fit	21 June 2001
Nathan explores the shapes, sizes, and textures of different fruit with similar names. Charli performs a dance with moves inspired by the fruit salad. Kellie and Chats decorate rice crackers with fruit to create funny food faces. Charli replicates the faces that different animals make when eating food. Tim makes musical shakers using rice, macaroni, and other foods. Charli moves her body like a milkshake being shaken. Kathleen prepares some roll-up sandwiches using flatbread, to take on the Hi-5 picnic. Charli is joined by the rest of Hi-5 for a picnic under a tree. Sharing Stories: Kathleen tells a story about a town where the people (Nathan, Charli, and Kellie) eat the buildings and furniture, until they run out of things to eat, and visit the inedible house of someone from a different town (Tim) in search of somewhere to live.
100	10	"Games and Sports"	Boom Boom Beat	Get Fit	22 June 2001
Kellie practises a taekwondo pattern and shows Chats her progress. Charli uses her body to say thank you in different ways. Nathan makes a hobby horse and challenges Tim to a race around an obstacle course. Charli pretends to be a Spanish dancing horse preparing for a competition. Tim plays a steel drum and finds other sounds that might be heard at a soccer game. Charli plays an imaginary game of football and practises her kicking skills. Kathleen searches her cupboards to solve a puzzle that Kellie has left for her. Charli mimes the actions of hopscotch, musical statues, and hide and seek. Sharing Stories: Nathan tells a story about a duck (Kellie) who befriends a young girl on the farm (Kathleen), and challenges her to some games with the other ducks (Charli and Tim).
101	11	"Perspective"	Opposites Attract	Opposite	25 June 2001
Kellie teaches Chats about sign language and helps her learns some signs. Charli uses sign language to show different directions and movements. Nathan uses a globe to show how day and night are formed on different sides of the world. Charli demonstrates her morning and nighttime routines. Tim sets up a drum kit in preparation for a drum lesson with Kellie. Charli tries to balance while standing on her toes. Kathleen contrasts the textures of some smooth and rough items and creates pencil rubbings to record the surfaces. Charli explores the differences between smooth and rough movements. Sharing Stories: Kellie tells a story about a boy (Tim) who meets two little tugboats (Charli and Kathleen) which appear to be much bigger from his perspective, and a large ship (Nathan) which originally appeared to be smaller.
102	12	"Inside and Outside"	Opposites Attract	Opposite	26 June 2001
Kathleen bakes muffins and endures Jup Jup's trickery from inside her magic oven. Charli pretends to cook a sausage on the barbecue outside. Nathan tries to find a space inside to hide a bunch of balloons. Charli imagines being a balloon floating in the air. Tim plays a tiktiri from India to summon a snake from inside a basket. Charli acts out movements that begin with S. Kellie and Chats build a snowman in the cold weather outside. Charli pretends to be a dog using a cardboard box as her imaginary home. Sharing Stories: Tim tells a story about a girl (Charli) who summons a magical genie (Nathan) from inside a bottle, and wishes to visit the inside of his home.
103	13	"Size"	Opposites Attract	Opposite	27 June 2001
Nathan plays with a slinky toy and replicates the spring-like movements with his body. Charli stretches and contracts her arms and fingers. Kathleen builds a house with sticks and experiments with making its shadow bigger and smaller. Charli makes her own shadow grow to different sizes. Tim plays low and high notes by changing the shape of his trombone. Charli plays an imaginary trombone and trumpet. Kellie and Chats find words to describe a large beach ball and a smaller soccer ball. Charli tries to move in the largest and smallest possible ways. Sharing Stories: Nathan tells a story about a girl (Kathleen) who visits her grandmother (Charli), where they reminisce about how she was much smaller as a baby.
104	14	"Feelings"	Opposites Attract	Opposite	28 June 2001
Nathan wonders what it would be like to live with everything turned upside down. Charli stands on her hands and moves in an upside down way. Kellie builds a vase with clay and washes her dirty hands with soapy water. Charli pretends to wash her hair and brush her teeth. Tim becomes a troubadour and serenades the noble people of a castle with a song. Charli pretends to be a peacock fanning out her feathers. Kathleen works as a psychiatrist and tries to make a sad elephant patient feel better. Charli tries to reach an itchy spot on her back. Sharing Stories: Charli tells a story about a boy (Nathan) who is given a new puppy (Kathleen) by his father (Tim), before his joy turns to sadness when the puppy goes runs away, and is later found in a pond with a turtle (Kellie).
105	15	"Movement"	Opposites Attract	Opposite	29 June 2001
Kathleen practises dancing the waltz while Jup Jup meddles with the tempo of her music. Charli pretends that her hands are an imaginary music box. Nathan becomes a racing car driver and designs his own winding track to race on. Charli waves the checkered racing flag in different directions to signal the drivers. Tim dresses up as a bird of fire and pretends to fly at different speeds and heights in the sky. Charli pretends to be a flying fish swimming in the ocean. Kellie does a dance to release her grumpy feelings, before changing the dance to match her happy mood. Charli performs a dance with opposing upward and downward movements. Sharing Stories: Tim tells a story about a girl (Kathleen) who experiments with the on-off switch of her music box, as she watches its two dancing dolls (Charli and Nathan) perform.
106	16	"Differences and Similarities"	Friends	Friends	2 July 2001
Kellie introduces Chats to her pet mouse, before she compares their similarities. Charli plays with her imaginary mouse, caterpillar, and butterfly friends. Kathleen searches for something different to wear to a party, and creates a flower headband. Charli dresses up in a combination of her friends' favourite clothes. Nathan places cardboard cutouts of Hi-5 in order of smallest to tallest. Charli wonders how she would move if she was made of cardboard. Tim considers the similarities and differences between himself and his pet dog. Charli explores how large sized dogs move in comparison to smaller dogs. Sharing Stories: Tim tells a story about a girl (Charli) who considers her reflection in the mirror (Kellie) to be a friend, and has a dream where her mirror self develops a persona of its own.
107	17	"Sharing and Caring"	Friends	Friends	3 July 2001
Nathan pilots a pretend helicopter to rescue Kathleen's toy elephant from a mountain. Charli undergoes an imaginary rescue mission while adventuring through the bush. Kellie and Chats think of words that rhyme with "bear". Charli pretends to be a teddy bear stretching and moving around. Tim receives some assistance from his friends when one of the strings on his guitar is broken. Charli pretends to play a guitar and the drums. Kathleen bakes a cake to welcome a friend back from a trip away from home. Charli pretends to be a batch of cake mixture being baked in the oven. Sharing Stories: Kellie tells a story about a girl (Charli) with three pets (Kathleen, Nathan, and Tim) who struggle to get along with one another, until they come together when one of the animals gets hurt.
108	18	"Unusual Friends"	Friends	Friends	4 July 2001
Tim meets a talking piano and uses jazz music to help it find its groove again. Charli performs a jazz-style dance routine. Kellie draws a face on Nathan's foot and introduces the foot friend to Chats. Charli performs a tap dance with a pair of smiley face shoes. Nathan adds faces to his pet rocks and forms a rock and roll band with his unusual new friends. Charli tries to lift a heavy rock and move it across her space. Kathleen makes a gift for the special friend living in her wall, who she hasn't met before. Charli bobs upwards and downwards. Sharing Stories: Nathan tells a story about a girl (Kathleen) goes on an adventure with imaginary friend (Tim) when her mother (Kellie) and dog (Charli) are both too busy to play.
109	19	"Making New Friends"	Friends	Friends	5 July 2001
Nathan becomes a caveman and uses a large rock to make a woolly mammoth friend. Charli dances with her mop while cleaning the floor. Kathleen packs her suitcase for a trip to meet her new baby cousin. Charli tries to decide on a method of transportation to use to travel to meet a friend. Tim dresses up as a king for a matching game involving musical instruments with his royal subjects. Charli moves and behaves in the way that a V.I.P. might act. Kellie crafts figurines with popsicle sticks and uses them to model making friends with Chats. Charli decides to introduce her elbows and knees to each other. Sharing Stories: Charli tells a story about two children (Kathleen and Tim) who are both too shy to introduce themselves to each other in the playground, but ultimately bond while seeking shelter from the wet weather.
110	20	"Fun with Friends"	Friends	Friends	6 July 2001
Kellie takes Chats for a ride through the park and to the beach on her bicycle. Charli takes small steps while on her way to meet a friend in the park. Tim uses his face to demonstrate different emotions while singing to music that matches the feelings. Charli moves in different ways to act out a variety of emotions. Kathleen finds a creative way to frame a collection of photographs featuring the rest of Hi-5. Charli draws a friendly face in the air. Nathan builds a cubby house and adjusts it to fit all of his friends inside. Charli builds an imaginary cubby house with the rest of Hi-5 acting as the walls. Sharing Stories: Charli tells a story about a girl (Kellie) who befriends a roll of sticky tape (Kathleen), a lost sock (Tim), and a building block (Nathan) hiding behind the sofa.
111	21	"Someone Else"	I Can Go Anywhere	Pretend	9 July 2001
Nathan becomes a cowboy and pretends to round up a herd of cows. Charli performs a cowgirl style dance. Kellie and Chats dress up in traditional saris from India. Charli dances to Indian music. Tim imagines being a rock and roll musician and practises playing his electric guitar. Charli rocks and rolls her body along the floor. Kathleen works as a telephone operator, answering calls and taking messages. Charli pretends to answer a telephone call. Sharing Stories: Nathan tells a story about three dress-up dolls (Kathleen, Kellie, and Charli) from Polynesia, Japan, and Australia, who tell each other about their countries when they are joined by a new Scottish doll (Tim).
112	22	"Something Else"	I Can Go Anywhere	Pretend	10 July 2001
Kellie dresses up in a skeleton costume and teaches Chats about her bones. Charli performs a dance inspired by the body of a crocodile. Kathleen revisits a marionette puppet that she played with as a baby. Charli pretends to be a baby marionette puppet learning to crawl. Tim plays an African talking drum and pretends to be one himself. Charli uses body percussion to communicate a talking drum message. Nathan explores a toy toolbox and dresses up as different tools from inside. Charli uses an imaginary saw to cut through a plank of wood. Sharing Stories: Kellie tells a story about a girl (Kathleen) who visits the library, and witnesses three characters (Tim, Charli, and Nathan) from different stories come to life when their books magically grow larger.
113	23	"Pretend to Be Animals"	I Can Go Anywhere	Pretend	11 July 2001
Kathleen dresses up as a cat while she prepares a frozen fruit smoothie. Charli pretends to be a newborn kitten curled up on the ground. Nathan weaves a pretend spider web while dressed up as a colourful spider. Charli dances like a spider moving with its eight legs. Tim becomes a Puerto Rican singing frog and sings a special song along with his friends. Charli demonstrates how a tadpole hatches from an egg and transforms into a frog. Kellie pretends to be a rhinoceros who can answer any of Chats's questions about jungle animals. Charli moves like a rhinoceros stomping its feet to mark its territory. Sharing Stories: Kathleen tells a story about two animal friends (Charli and Kellie) who try to encourage a kookaburra (Nathan) to laugh, when he decides he doesn't feel like laughing.
114	24	"Adventures"	I Can Go Anywhere	Pretend	12 July 2001
Nathan becomes a knight and builds a castle to rescue a princess from. Kathleen goes on an adventure when she follows a map in search of hidden treasure. Charli uses her arms to make the shapes of diamonds and other treasures. Tim plays the bagpipes and imagines visiting Scotland to accompany a traditional maypole dance. Charli performs a Scottish dance. Kellie and Chats dress up as fairies for an adventure to a magical fairy garden. Charli pretends to be a fairy sprinkling magic dust. Sharing Stories: Charli tells a story about a pirate called Captain Puffy Pants (Tim), whose pants cause a commotion when he competes against his nemesis Captain High Note (Kathleen) in a race, along with his crew (Nathan and Kellie).
115	25	"Fantastical"	I Can Go Anywhere	Pretend	13 July 2001
Kellie asks Chats to guess which form of transportation she is acting out. Charli pretends to be a machine built for dancing. Nathan designs a long dragon costume to wear for a dance. Charli dresses up as a fantastical creature from her imagination. Kathleen becomes a magician and practises a magic trick with the help of Jup Jup. Charli warms up her fingers before performing a magic trick. Tim plays a harp as he pretends to be the keeper of the stars in the night sky. Charli moves like a shooting star. Sharing Stories: Tim tells a story about a boy (Nathan) who tricks the tooth fairy (Kellie) and her helpers (Charli and Kathleen) into visiting him early, before the fairy loses a tooth herself.
121	26	"Travel and Space"	Let's Get to Work	Inventions	16 July 2001
Nathan explores the differences between riding a bicycle, a unicycle, and a tricycle. Charli jumps on a pogo stick. Kellie and Chats try to find shapes in the stars while looking through a telescope. Charli imagines being a girl who lives on the moon. Tim uses the back of his utility truck as the stage for a bush band performance with the rest of Hi-5. Charli rolls and spins a tyre along the ground. Kathleen invents a system to sort her clothes and keep them tidy in her cupboards. Charli sorts pairs of matching socks according to their colours. Sharing Stories: Kellie tells a story about two children (Kathleen and Nathan) who invent a spaceship with recycled materials and travel to space, where they meet two space explorers (Tim and Charli) and invite them back to Earth.
122	27	"Homes and in the Community"	Let's Get to Work	Inventions	17 July 2001
Nathan explores different kinds of clocks and practises telling the time. Charli pretends to be an alarm clock waking up the household. Kathleen builds a spaceship with chairs and building blocks to match a smaller model. Charli pretends to be a spaceship travelling through space. Tim sells frozen desserts while transporting them in a refrigerated trolley. Charli moves like an ice block melting in the sun. Kellie and Chats decorate cupcakes by spelling a special word using icing. Charli spells the sentence 'I love you' using her body. Sharing Stories: Tim tells a story about two siblings (Kellie and Nathan) and their cat (Charli), who invent a way to wake up their sister (Kathleen) in the morning.
123	28	"Fun Inventions"	Let's Get to Work	Inventions	18 July 2001
Tim plays a didgeridoo and makes the sounds of different Australian animals. Charli moves like different Australian animals; a kangaroo, an emu, and a wombat. Kellie uses a bubble making kit to blow bubbles of different shapes and sizes. Charli blows imaginary bubbles. Nathan invents a game where he and Tim must try and think in the same way. Charli and Kathleen try to perform the same actions as each other. Kathleen weighs rocks using a set of scales, and builds a seesaw to measure larger objects. Charli uses her arms to replicate the movements of a seesaw. Sharing Stories: Nathan tells a story about a girl (Kellie) who borrows a magical comb from her great-aunt (Kathleen), and experiments with giving her friends (Charli and Tim) some new hairstyles.
124	29	"Communication"	Let's Get to Work	Inventions	19 July 2001
Kellie teaches Chats how to read a word transcribed in Braille. Charli represents her emotions by moving in different ways. Nathan completes a puzzle featuring shapes of different technologies for communication. Charli mimes the actions of using different communication methods. Tim experiments with the letters of the musical alphabet. Charli performs a movement for each letter of the musical alphabet. Kathleen invents a way to share secret messages using symbols and picture clues. Charli uses signals to relay messages for a secret club. Sharing Stories: Kathleen tells a story about a young scientist (Charli) who wishes to communicate with fish, and gets the chance to talk to a group of fish (Nathan, Kellie, and Tim) over the telephone.
125	30	"Fantasy"	Let's Get to Work	Inventions	20 July 2001
Kathleen uses recycled materials to build a fantastical machine for transportation. Charli pretends to be a machine designed to move forwards and backwards. Kellie invents a way to sing a song while playing all of her favourite instruments at once. Charli plays a pair of castanets, cymbals, and a tambourine. Tim chooses instruments to accompany his life-sized musical merry-go-round. Charli pretends to be the model horse of a merry-go-round. Nathan uses a mind-reading machine to discover what Kathleen has been dreaming about. Charli recalls a dream she had about a land full of dancing. Sharing Stories: Charli tells a story about a faraway marketplace, where three customers (Kathleen, Nathan, and Tim) purchase special new shoes from a mysterious vendor (Kellie).
116	31	"Finding Treasure"	Buried Treasure	Treasures	23 July 2001
Kellie and Chats go on a pretend expedition in search of different dinosaurs. Charli moves like an imaginary dinosaur, a "laugh-asaurus". Kathleen finds a silver teapot and makes three wishes, which Jup Jup attempts to grant. Charli makes noise with bells on her fingers and flippers on her feet. Tim searches for treasure by listening to musical clues and playing different instruments. Charli sings about finding treasure. Nathan creates a map of an island and marks a place for hidden treasure to be buried. Charli follows a treasure map and navigates around an imaginary island. Sharing Stories: Kellie tells a story about a pirate named Captain Puffy Pants (Tim) who searches for treasure on an island along with his nemesis Captain High Note (Kathleen) and two island dogs (Charli and Nathan).
117	32	"Collecting Treasure"	Buried Treasure	Treasures	24 July 2001
Nathan works as a paleontologist and collects the bones of a dinosaur skeleton. Charli explores the bones in her body. Kellie uses a flower press to preserve a selection of flowers for Chats. Charli accumulates dried rose petals by plucking them from their stems. Tim used a sound machine to collect noises and make music with them. Charli uses her memory to combine a routine of dance steps. Kathleen counts the collections of her favourite treasures while Jup Jup adds more items to the groups. Charli performs a series of silly movements. Sharing Stories: Tim tells a story about a girl (Kellie) who dreams that the posters of her favourite sporting stars (Charli, Nathan, and Kathleen) come to life, giving her the opportunity to play their sports with them.
118	33	"Creating Treasure"	Buried Treasure	Treasures	25 July 2001
Kellie and Chats construct a miniature boat made of treasures collected from the beach. Charli explores the textures of different seashells. Tim invents a new musical instrument by combining the rest of Hi-5's favourite instruments. Charli choreographs a dance featuring her favourite movements. Kathleen decorates a box with jewels to create a place to store her treasures. Charli sings about her heartbeat, a treasure inside of her. Nathan builds unusual sculptures from different shapes for an art show display. Charli pretends to be a statue at an art gallery. Sharing Stories: Kathleen tells a story about a girl (Charli) who decides to collect memorabilia from the beach while on holiday, with the help of the island animals (Tim and Nathan) and her grandmother (Kellie).
119	34	"Precious Treasure"	Buried Treasure	Treasures	26 July 2001
Kathleen devises a plan to find her missing watch. Charli searches for something precious. Kellie and Chats display magnetic pictures on a refrigerator and match the images with words. Charli reads different words and performs the actions that they each express. Tim makes music using his different body parts. Charl demonstrates how her body can move quietly. Nathan plays with a model steam train and builds a track for it to travel along. Charli pretends to be a train collecting passengers around town. Sharing Stories: Charli tells a story about a boy (Nathan) who spends his birthday in the hospital because of a broken leg, and is visited by his mother (Kellie), neighbour (Kathleen), and his favourite sports star (Tim).
120	35	"Memories and Moments"	Buried Treasure	Treasures	27 July 2001
Tim recalls how his grandfather taught him to make a guitar using a tissue box. Charli is measured so that her auntie (Kellie) can make a dress for her. Nathan constructs a kite, like he used to when he was younger. Charli decides to fly a kite outside until the weather changes. Kathleen bakes gingerbread people using her mother's special recipe. Charli plays a ball game that her father taught her to play. Kellie presents Chats with a scrapbook featuring photographs of their favourite memories together. Charli reenacts her photographs by moving in different ways. Sharing Stories: Nathan tells a story about a girl (Kathleen) who tries to film her family (Kellie, Charli, and Tim) for a school project, but struggles to contain their silly antics in the process.
126	36	"Mysteries of Nature"	I Spy	Mysteries	30 July 2001
Nathan experiments with magnets and imagines having a giant horseshoe magnet. Charli pretends to be magnetic and becomes attracted to different items. Kellie shows Chats how a tree frog uses its webbed feet to glide from tree to tree. Charli uses puppets to demonstrate how tree frogs fly. Tim goes bush walking and listens to the sounds of a mysterious bird call. Charli pretends to be a kookaburra intruding at a barbecue. Kathleen experiments with sand and discovers how to build a stable sandcastle. Charli builds an imaginary sandcastle. Sharing Stories: Tim tells a story about a caterpillar (Kathleen) who dreams of being a dancer, and seeks help from her friends (Nathan and Charli) and a shoe seller (Kellie) to find the perfect style of dance.
127	37	"Detectives"	I Spy	Mysteries	31 July 2001
Nathan becomes a detective and dresses up in a disguise for solving a mystery. Charli tries on different disguises. Kathleen follows clues from inside her cupboards to determine which mystery animal to dress up as. Charli pretends to be different animals. Tim discovers the mixed-up body parts of different made-up animals. Charli practises the lion and tiger yoga poses. Kellie and Chats use a magic marker to uncover a secret message hidden on a blank piece of paper. Charli tries to interpret the meaning of three random words. Sharing Stories: Kathleen tells a story about a girl (Kellie) who misplaces the television remote, and interrogates her family (Tim, Nathan, and Charli) to solve the mystery.
128	38	"Physical Mysteries"	I Spy	Mysteries	1 August 2001
Kellie discovers a magical pillow that makes a laughing sound when it is squeezed. Charli explores how her body moves when she laughs. Nathan wonders why people have certain body parts, and why his hair and fingernails grow. Charli imagines being a dragon with scaly and hairy body parts. Tim wonders what it would be like to be a giant trying to make music. Charli moves around like a giant. Kathleen runs a restaurant and tries to find the best way to serve her noodle soup. Charli cooks an imaginary pizza. Sharing Stories: Charli tells a story about a boy (Nathan) who tries to cure his hiccups with the help of his mother (Kellie), a scientist (Tim), and a fairy (Kathleen).
129	39	"Myth and Fantasy"	I Spy	Mysteries	2 August 2001
Nathan interprets ancient symbols while searching for a hidden pyramid in Egypt. Charli sits like a lotus flower, followed by a cobra. Kathleen compiles a costume of mixed-up patterns for a fancy dress party. Charli dresses in warm clothes for a winter weather outside. Tim searches for mermaids and plays a conch shell to call out to sea. Charli pretends to be a mermaid playing in the ocean. Kellie challenges Chats to find mythical creatures hidden in a picture of a magic forest. Charli imagines being a magical tree. Sharing Stories: Nathan tells a story about a bunyip (Charli) who struggles to sleep, leading her parents (Kathleen and Tim) to enter her in a race against another bunyip (Kellie) to tire her.
130	40	"Fun Mysteries / The Hi-5 Mystery"	I Spy	Mysteries	3 August 2001
Kathleen makes a mystery sculpture of a face using vegetables. Charli moves as if her body was made of fruit and vegetables. Kellie and Chats explore special words that have multiple meanings. Charli exercises her bare feet. Tim pretends to summon aliens from outer space by playing unusual music. Charli pretends to be a space creature arriving on Earth. Nathan follows mysterious signs which show him how to move in different ways. Charli finds a way to move by involving hopping, skipping, and jumping. Sharing Stories: Chats tells a story about a circus, where Kellie, Kathleen, Nathan, Charli, and Tim must work out how their special equipment fits in with each of their roles at the circus.
131	41	"People"	You're My Number One	Favourites	6 August 2001
Nathan works as a truck driver, making deliveries throughout the day. Charli cleans Nathan's truck. Tim becomes the conductor of an orchestra with the rest of Hi-5 playing different instruments. Charli conducts an imaginary orchestra using her hands. Kathleen pretends to be a police officer reporting for traffic duty around town. Charli walks like a police officer on duty. Kellie and Chats explore how firefighters carry out their duties during emergencies. Charli practises dressing in fire clothes during an emergency drill. Sharing Stories: Kellie tells a story about a pirate called Captain Puffy Pants (Tim) whose oversized pants get in the way during a safety drill along with the other pirates (Kathleen, Nathan, and Charli).
132	42	"Favourite Animals"	You're My Number One	Favourites	7 August 2001
Kellie and Chats read about meerkats and how they interact with other animals. Charli prowls around like a lion. Tim forms a band with three puppies who can sing and play musical instruments. Charli dresses up as a pop music singing parrot. Kathleen builds a pet using cardboard boxes and learns how to take care of it. Charli pets a kitten. Nathan explores how emperor penguins move in groups and huddle to keep warm. Charli pretends to be a penguin skating across the ice. Sharing Stories: Kathleen tells a story about two neighbours (Kellie and Nathan) who get together to train their dogs (Tim and Charli) and learn new tricks from each other.
133	43	"Games"	You're My Number One	Favourites	8 August 2001
Kellie practises her surfing technique on the land before going out to sea. Charli goes surfing on an imaginary board. Nathan plays with a collection of spinning tops and replicates the movements with his body. Charli spins around like a spinning top. Tim performs a selection of magic tricks involving musical instruments. Charli plays an imaginary guitar. Kathleen plays a game that involves sorting socks and discovering Jup Jup's secret message. Charli introduces two sock puppets to each other. Sharing Stories: Charli tells a story about four friends (Kathleen, Kellie, Nathan, and Tim) who invent a silly dancing game to keep themselves occupied on a rainy day.
134	44	"Foods"	You're My Number One	Favourites	9 August 2001
Kathleen runs a sandwich shop and prepares a variety of orders. Charli makes imaginary sandwiches for the rest of Hi-5. Kellie and Chats decorate a birthday cake to look like the beach. Charli wobbles like jelly. Tim makes music with kitchen equipment while cooking his favourite meal. Charli mixes with a wooden spoon and an egg whisk. Nathan uses pasta of different shapes and colours to make a pattern in a jar. Charli makes a patterned necklace by threading coloured penne pasta on string. Sharing Stories: Nathan tells a story about three children (Charli, Tim, and Kathleen) who open a family restaurant and serve a range of unusual dishes to their mother (Kellie).
135	45	"Celebrations"	You're My Number One	Favourites	10 August 2001
Tim holds a musical party to celebrate his guitar's birthday. Charli throws a party for her toys. Kathleen searches for a way to wear her fancy pair of oversized pants. Charli dances while wearing her fancy pants. Nathan uses a bed sheet to create a costume for a fancy dress party. Charli pretends to be a caterpillar transforming into a butterfly. Kellie and Chats go on a moonlit walk through the park in search of nocturnal animals. Charli pretends to be an owl flying in search of a party. Sharing Stories: Charli tells a story about a group of space creatures (Tim, Nathan, Kellie, and Kathleen) who get together to celebrate on a party-themed planet.

== Home video releases ==
Series	DVD Title	Release Date (Region 4)	Songs of the Week	Ref.
3	Five Alive	VHS: 3 September 2001; DVD: 1 October 2003	Boom Boom Beat; Friends; Rain Rain	
3	Playing Cool	VHS: 19 November 2001; DVD: 11 February 2004	You're My Number One; Let's Get to Work; I Spy	
3	Magical Treasures	VHS: 25 February 2002; DVD: 9 September 2004	I Can Go Anywhere (Note: Labelled as "Let's Pretend".); Opposites Attract; Buried Treasure	

== Awards and nominations ==
List of awards and nominations received by Hi-5 series 3
Award	Year	Recipient(s) and nominee(s)	Category	Result	Ref.
APRA Screen Music Awards	2002	Chris Harriott, Lisa Hoppe, Chris Phillips (for "Opposites Attract")	Best Music for Children's Television	Nominated	
APRA Screen Music Awards	2002	Chris Harriott, Various (for songlets)	Best Music for Children's Television	Nominated	
Logie Awards	2002	Hi-5	Most Outstanding Children's Program	Nominated	
