= Nathan Foley =

Nathan Foley may refer to:

- Nathan Foley (footballer), Australian rules footballer
- Nathan Foley (singer), performer in children's group Hi-5
