= Tim Harding =

Tim Harding may refer to:

- Tim Harding (musician) (born 1978), Australian musician and entertainer
- Tim Harding (chess player) (born 1948), chess author, player and historian

== See also ==
- Tim Hardin (1941–1980), American musician and composer
