= Cushion Kids =

Australian children's television series

- Genre: Children's; Preschool
- Created by: Helena Harris; Posie Graeme-Evans
- Directed by: Ian Munro; Karl Zwicky
- Creative director: Nadia Benussi
- Starring: Yvette Robinson; Anthony Grundy; John Leary; Lisa Adam; Zac McKay; Meaghan Davies; Ben Frost
- Voices of: Tim Harding
- Opening theme: "Cushion Kids Theme"
- Ending theme: "Cushion Kids Theme"
- Composers: Chris Harriott; Marty Irwin
- Country of origin: Australia
- Original language: English
- No. of seasons: 2
- No. of episodes: 26

Production
- Executive producer: Kris Noble
- Producer: Helena Harris
- Production location: TCN-9
- Running time: 23 minutes
- Production companies: Kids Like Us; Nine Films and Television

Original release
- Network: Nine Network
- Release: November 2000 – December 2001

Cushion Kids is an Australian children's television show produced by Kids Like Us and Nine Films and Television. It was created by Helena Harris and Posie Graeme-Evans, who also created Hi-5 for Nine as well as Bananas in Pyjamas for the ABC. The live action series features costumed cushion characters and is presented as comedy and drama for children. It aired on Nine from November 2000 to December 2001.

== Characters ==
- Polly Posh (played by Yvette Robinson) – A cushion who is elegant and stylish, and does not like messes.
- Cosmo (played by Anthony Grundy) – A talented inventor.
- Grumpy Lumpy (played by John Leary) – A very grumpy postman.
- Pippa (played by Lisa Adam) – A cushion who loves to experience adventure.
- Baz (played by Zach McKay) – A talented surfer at the beach and slightly lazy.
- Bubs (voiced by Meaghan Davies) – A baby cushion.
- Zip the Bird (played by Ben Frost; voiced by Tim Harding) – A bird cushion puppet who serves as the narrator of the program.

== VHSs and DVDs ==
Both Cushion Kids videos were released on VHS in Australia by Roadshow Entertainment and DVDs released in Philippines by Viva Video Inc. in 2007.

- Meet The Kids (2001)
- Cushion Cuddles (2002)
