= Kathleen de Leon Jones =

Australian actress, dancer, and singer (born 1977)

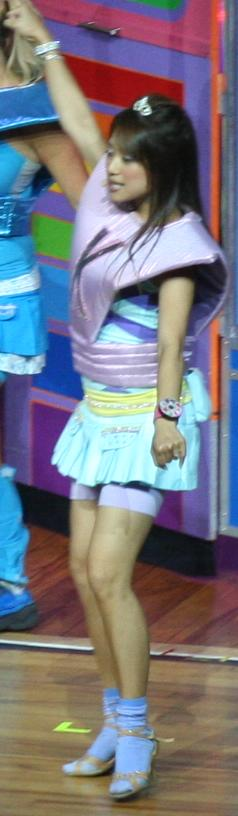
- Kathleen de Leon Jones performing with Hi-5 in January 2006
- Born: Kathleen de Leon; 1 September 1977 (age 49); Manila, Philippines
- Occupations: Actress; dancer; singer
- Years active: 1997–2009
- Spouse: Daniel Jones (m. 2005)
- Children: 2
- Musical career
- Origin: Sydney, Australia
- Genres: Pop; R&B; children's music
- Instrument: Vocals
- Label: Sony BMG
- Formerly of: Hi-5

Kathleen de Leon Jones (born Kathleen de Leon, 1 September 1977) is a Filipino-born Australian actress, dancer, and singer. She was an original cast member of the ARIA Award winning Australian children's musical group Hi-5 from 1998 to 2006 and left Hi-5 after nine years with the group.

== Personal life ==
De Leon was born in Manila on 1 September 1977 and moved to Australia in 1978 with her parents. She is the oldest of three daughters; her two younger sisters Jennifer and Melanie were born in Australia. The family spent most of de Leon's childhood in Sydney.

On 30 April 2000, when de Leon was 22 years old, she met her future husband Daniel Jones. At the time, Jones was a member of the Australian pop band Savage Garden. The couple met at the 42nd Annual TV Week Logie Awards.

In 2003, after over three years of dating, Jones proposed to de Leon during his 30th birthday party at the GPO Bar in Brisbane. Over one hundred attendees—including Jones' parents—were "shocked" by the surprise proposal.

On 9 October 2005, de Leon and Jones married at Avica Weddings and Resort on the Gold Coast in Queensland. De Leon's wedding dress was designed by Bora of Bora Couture, while one of her friends designed a pearl set for the back of the gown and diamond pieces for the front. Jones wrote a song titled "Love Is Enough" for his bride.

On 25 February 2006, de Leon confirmed that she was four months pregnant. The couple's oldest daughter was born on 26 July 2006, and a second daughter was born on 30 October 2010.

== Professional career ==
De Leon started singing and dancing at an early age. She taught herself to play the guitar, prompting her parents to enrol her in The McDonald College, an exclusive performing arts school in Sydney, Australia. She was awarded both the Roberta Armstrong and Kelloggs Scholarships to study at the school, where she studied dance, drama, and voice for a number of years while making professional auditions in her spare time.

De Leon also trained with the Australian College of Entertainment in Castle Hill, New South Wales. She also competed in the Australian television talent show New Faces—where she came third in the grand final—and appeared on various Australian television shows, including Heartbreak High, Ridgey Didge, Swap Shop, and the At Home Show with John Mangos.

It was while she was performing at a fundraiser for The McDonald College that de Leon was discovered by one of the directors for the Cameron MacIntosh company. She appeared in two musicals in Australia mounted by the Macintosh company, Miss Saigon and Rent. She stayed with the cast of Rent (where she was Christine Anu's understudy for the role of Mimi) and was dance captain for the musical, until being cast in Hi-5 in 1998. She featured with a puppet named "Jup-Jup", voiced originally by co-cast member Tim Harding. De Leon and Jup-Jup's segment of the show, Puzzles and Patterns, promoted and educated children on problem-solving and mathematics.

=== Departure from Hi-5 ===
In July 2007, de Leon left Hi-5 permanently to focus on raising her daughter. De Leon stated that she was still interested in working on television, but only if an opportunity existed in her then-home of Sydney so she could remain close to her family. De Leon was the first of all the original members to permanently leave Hi-5. Sun Park replaced de Leon in Hi-5.

As of 2015, de Leon, Jones and their daughters were residing in Las Vegas. In November 2016, while in the process of selling some properties in Surfers Paradise, she stated that they would one day look to move back to the Gold Coast. They returned home to live on the Gold Coast in 2023.
