= Nathan Foley (singer) =

Australian dancer

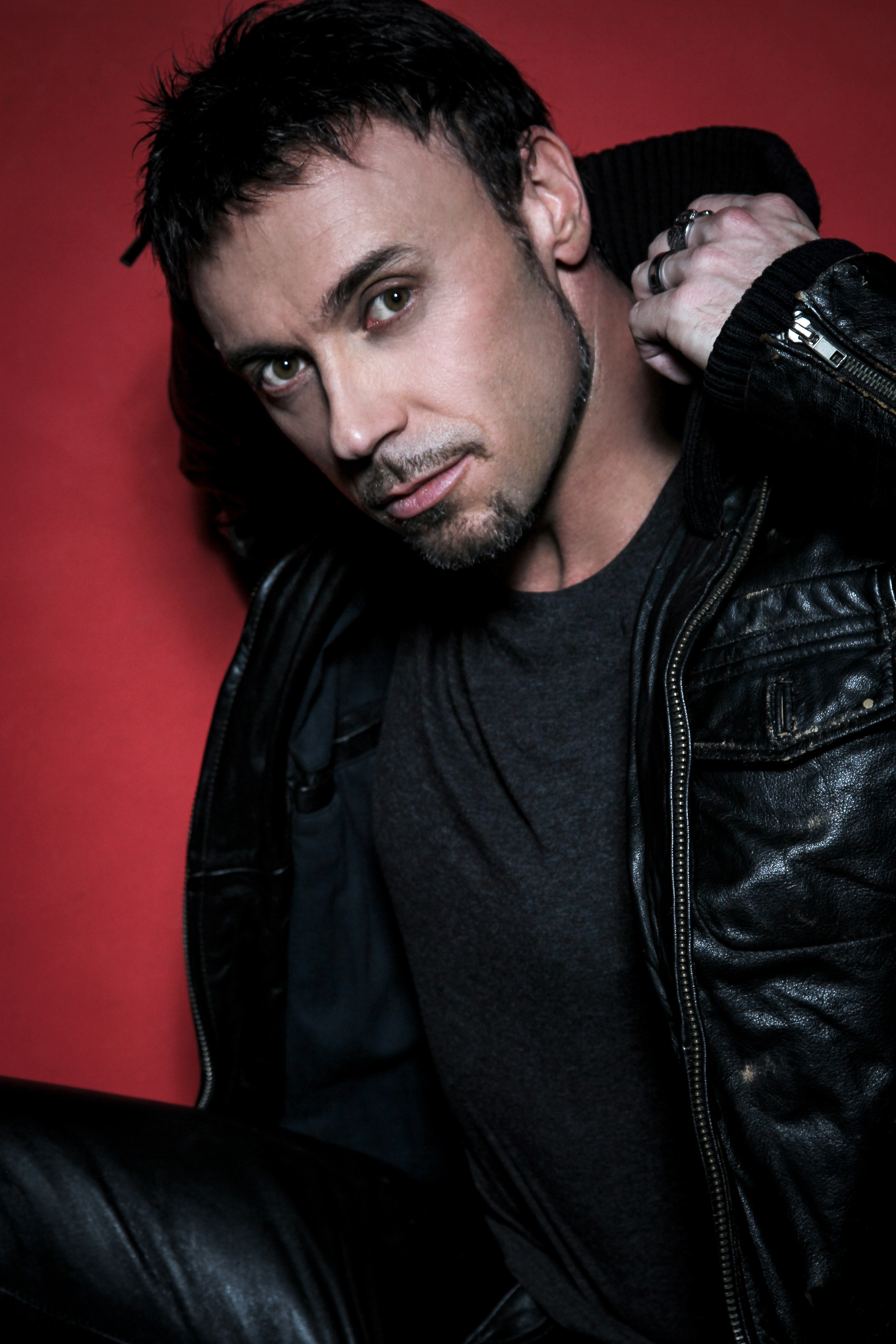
- Foley in 2020
- Born: Nathan Joel Foley; 27 September 1979 (age 47); Liverpool, New South Wales, Australia
- Occupations: Singer-songwriter; actor
- Years active: 1990–present
- Spouse: Nicolette Gomex (m. 2019)
- Children: 1
- Musical career
- Instruments: Vocals; guitar; piano

Nathan Joel Foley (born 27 September 1979) is an Australian singer-songwriter and television personality. He was an original member of Australian children's musical group Hi-5 from 1998 to 2008.

== Early life ==
Foley started singing professionally at 10 years old with bands singing jazz, soul, R&B, pop and rock in clubs in Sydney, Australia. During his school years, Foley performed in the Coca-Cola Schools Spectacular for seven years as a soloist working with big bands and orchestra's and graduated from the Talent Development Project in 1997.

Foley is a descendant of the Yuin people, an Aboriginal Australian group, on his mother's side.

== Career ==
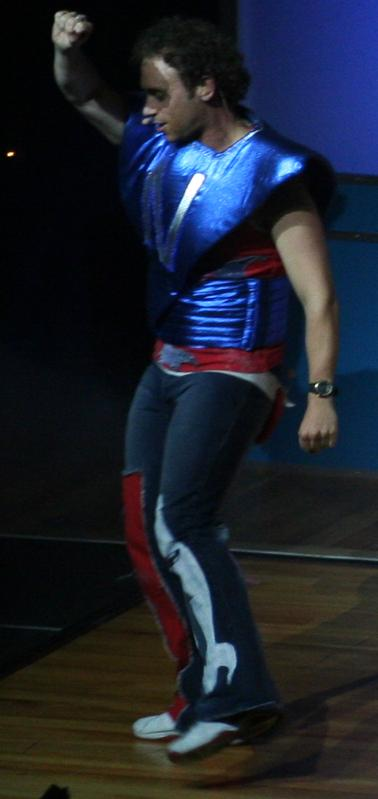
Foley performed in 2006.

In 1998, Foley joined the Australian children's musical group Hi-5 as an original member; touring and filming the related television series for ten years. Foley announced his departure from the group in November 2008, expressing interest in focusing on his adult music career. He was replaced by Tim Maddren.

In 2009, Foley completed a season of Jerry Springer: The Opera at the Sydney Opera House and played Kenickie in the Olivia Newton-John Foundation musical Grease on the Beach. He also performed as a soloist in 2009 at The V8 Supercars and World Masters Games, and sung the National Anthem at the Darling Harbour Australia Day Celebrations in 2010 in front of quarter of a million people.

Foley performed in the musical Mamma Mia!, touring Australia in 2010. He was also Co-Presenter of a show called Gathering on Foxtel's Indigenous Network NITV. Also in 2011, he worked as a traffic reporter at the Australian Traffic network delivering traffic reports for Ten News, Mix 106.5, 101.7 WSFM, 2GO, Sea FM, Triple M, 2GB and 2UE.

Foley was a top 3 contestant on the Network 10 show I Will Survive.

In 2016, Foley won Princess cruises Entertainer of the year for his big band solo shows being the first Australian to win this title.

In 2019, Foley auditioned for The Voice and was placed on Delta Goodrem's team. Foley was eliminated in the first Knock-out rounds.

== Personal life ==
Through the show, he became good friends with and eventually in 2002 began dating fellow Hi-5 cast member Kellie Crawford, née Hoggart. The couple became engaged in 2005 to be married in March 2007. On 7 December 2006, it was reported that Crawford and Foley had decided to end their engagement. Apparently, their breakup had occurred some time prior to the reports.

Foley married Jamaican model Nicolette Gomex in March 2020, and they have one child, Jackson Joel Foley.

== Discography ==
=== Studio albums ===
Title	Album details
Good Times	Released: 1990; Label: Independent; Format: CD
Discovery	Released: 2003; Label: Independent; Format: CD
Now and Forever	Released: July 2014
Mama	Released: February 2016; Label: Independent; Format: CD
Christmas Time With You	Released: 2016; Label: Independent; Format: CD, digital download
At This Moment	Released: February 2018; Label: Independent; Format: CD, digital download
Hurricane	Released: 23 September 2022; Label: StudioBox Creative; Format: CD, digital download, streaming

=== Live albums ===
Title	Album details
Live at the Starlight	Released: 2005; Label: Independent; Format: CD
Acoustic Rhythms	Released: 31 October 2011; Label: Independent; Format: CD, digital download

== Filmography ==
Year	Title	Role	Notes
1999–2008	Hi-5	Presenter	Series 1 to 10
2019	The Voice	Contestant	Series 8; eliminated in "The Knockouts" round
2019	The Road to Miss Universe Australia	Singer At Event	
2020	The Wiggles Bushfire Relief concert	Guest Performer	

== Awards and nominations ==
Year	Award	Category	Nominee	Result	Ref.
1997	Mo Award	Johnny O'Keefe Encouragement Award	Nathan Foley	Won	
1998	ACE Awards	Best New Talent	Nathan Foley	Won	
1998	City of Sydney Performing Arts Challenge		Nathan Foley	Won	
1998	2UE Youth in Cabaret - City of Sydney Performing Arts Challenge	Contemporary Vocal Solo	Nathan Foley	Won	
2016	Princess Cruises	Entertainer Of The Year - Solo Award	Nathan Foley	Won	
