= Tim Harding (musician) =

Australian musician

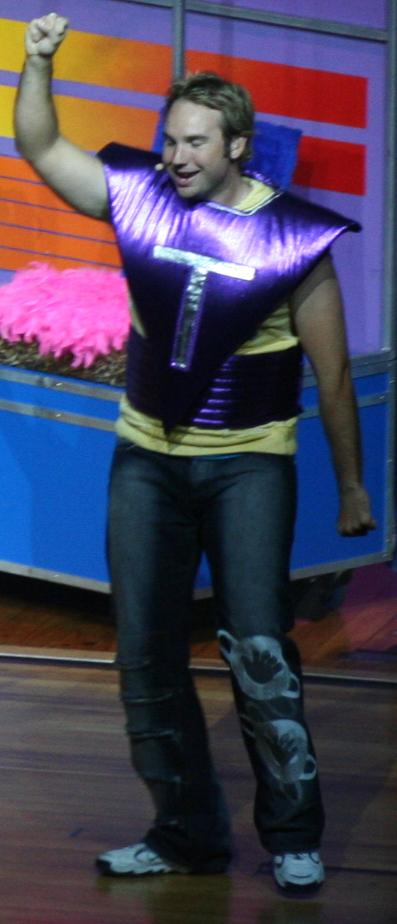
- Harding in 2006
- Born: Timothy John Harding; 1 February 1978 (age 48); Gosford, New South Wales, Australia
- Occupations: Musician; singer; dancer
- Years active: 1993–present
- Spouse: Natasha Humphries (m. 2009)
- Children: 2
- Musical career
- Genres: Children's; pop; alternative rock
- Instruments: Vocals; guitar
- Label: Sony
- Formerly of: Hi-5

Timothy John Harding (born 1 February 1978) is an Australian musician, singer, guitarist, entertainer. He was a founding member of the Australian children's musical group Hi-5 from 1998 to 2007.

== Life and career ==
Harding grew up in Sydney, Australia, with two younger brothers named Peter and James and attended St Andrew's Cathedral School. In 1993, he began a funk band, Compos Mentis, with his brother Peter, family friend Mike McCarthy and bass player Sam O'Donnell. He does a bit of boxing and surfing. In 1998, whilst studying social work at university, he auditioned for the children's musical group debut in Hi-5 from April 12, 1999. Harding was accepted and remained a core member of the group until he left it on 12 November 2007 after suffering a broken back and toes in a motorcycle accident at Eastern Creek Raceway earlier that year and was replaced by Stevie Nicholson. Whilst Harding was in Hi-5, they won five ARIA Music Awards and three Logie Awards.

Harding formerly lived in Newcastle, but as of 2025 he currently lives in the UK with his wife Tash and daughters Arielle and Beatrix and works as a freelance entertainer and musician. During his time in Newcastle, he sang with the Sydney-based weddings and functions band Soultraders. Harding also provided the voices for Zip the Bird in Cushion Kids and Jup Jup in Hi-5.
