= Haggett =

Haggett is a surname. Notable people with the surname include:

- Belinda Haggett (born 1962), former New South Wales Breakers and Australia cricketer
- Calum Haggett (born 1990), English cricketer who plays for Kent County Cricket Club
- Peter Haggett (1933–2025), British geographer and academic
- Reg Haggett, former association football player who represented New Zealand at international level

== See also ==
- Haggett Hall, set of two towers located in the northeast section of the University of Washington campus
- Hogget (disambiguation)
- Huggett
