= Hoggart =

Hoggart is a surname. Notable people with the surname include:

- Dennis Hoggart (born 1939), Scottish footballer
  - Kyllé Hoggart (credited as Kylle Hogart), Dennis' daughter, Australian actress
  - Kellie Crawford (née Hoggart) (born 1974), Dennis' daughter, Australian singer and actress, Teen Queens and Hi-5
- Paul Hoggart, British journalist and writer
- Herbert Richard Hoggart (1918–2014), British academic and writer
  - Simon Hoggart (1946–2014), Herbert's son, English journalist and broadcaster
    - Amy Hoggart, (born 1986), Simon's daughter, British-American stand-up comedian and actress
  - Paul Hoggart, Herbert's son, British journalist and novelist
