= Huggett =

Huggett is a surname. Notable people with the surname include:

- Alf Huggett (1892–1972), Australian rules footballer
- Anne Huggett (1942–1992), American activist for women
- Annie Huggett (1892–1996), English suffragette and political activist
- Arthur Huggett (1861–1945), English cricketer
- Arthur St George Huggett (1897–1968), British physiologist
- Brian Huggett (born 1936), Welsh professional golfer
- Catherine Huggett, OAM (1970–2011), Australian Paralympic swimmer who won two medals at two Paralympics
- Chris Huggett, engineer/designer, co-founded Electronic Dream Plant (EDP), founded Oxford Synthesiser Company
- Maurice Huggett (1945–2011), proprietor of the Phoenix Artist Club in Soho, London
- Monica Huggett (born 1953), British conductor and leading Baroque violinist
- Nick Huggett (born 1966), American philosopher
- Ralf Huggett or Ralf Hogge, English iron-master and gun founder to the king, cast the first iron cannon in England, in 1543
- Richard Huggett (political candidate), British citizen who stood in a variety of elections using descriptions similar to established political parties
- Richard Huggett (playwright) (1929–2000), British playwright
- Sandra Huggett (born 1973), British actress
- Stuart Huggett, British-born Fijian architect, businessman, and civil servant
- Susan Huggett (born 1954), former field hockey player from Zimbabwe

== See also ==
- Huggett, Alberta, Leduc County, Alberta
- The Huggetts (film series), three 1940s British films about the fictional Huggett family
- Hogget (disambiguation)
- Huguet
- Huguette, feminine French given name
