= Hoggett =

Hoggett is a surname. Notable people with the surname include:

- Steven Hoggett (born 1971), British choreographer
- Roger Hoggett (1942–2019), Australian rules footballer

== See also ==
- Hogget (disambiguation)
- Hoggart
- Hogsett
