= Sophie Katinis =

Australian actress

- Born: Melbourne, Australia
- Other names: Sophie Roche
- Occupation: Actress
- Years active: 2003–present

Sophie Katinis, also known as Sophie Roche, is an Australian actress, singer and voice-over artist who has appeared in many television and theatre roles.

== Television ==
Katinis played the role of university student Mel Bennett on the drama headLand in 2006. This led to a starring role as personal assistant Tina Carmody in the comedy series Stupid, Stupid Man followed by the role of Gabby West in the BBC Television commissioned Australian soap opera, Out of the Blue. In 2010, she had a guest role in Packed to the Rafters and joined Home & Away as Veronica. Katinis was also the puppeteer and voice actress for Chatterbox in Hi-5 (Series 5 with replay episodes for Series 6, hosted by original member Kellie Crawford (née Hoggart)).

Katinis has appeared in many Australian television commercials including a well known role as "Amy", the pushy girlfriend in television advertisements for insurer AAMI.

== Theatre ==
Katinis played the role of "Ellen" in the 2007 Australian production of Miss Saigon.
