= Hi-5 series 7 =

Hi-5
- Series 7
- Starring: Kellie Crawford; Kathleen de Leon Jones; Nathan Foley; Tim Harding; Charli Robinson
- No. of episodes: 45

Release
- Original network: Nine Network
- Original release: 23 May – 22 July 2005

Season chronology
- ← Previous; Series 6 Next → Series 8

The seventh series of the children's television series Hi-5 aired between 23 May 2005 and 22 July 2005 on the Nine Network in Australia. The season was produced by Kids Like Us for Nine with Helena Harris as executive producer. The series featured the 300th episode.

== Cast ==
=== Presenters ===
- Kellie Crawford – Word Play
- Kathleen de Leon Jones – Puzzles and Patterns
- Nathan Foley – Shapes in Space
- Tim Harding – Making Music
- Charli Robinson – Body Move

== Episodes ==
No. overall	No. in series	Title	Song of the Week	Theme	Original release date
256	1	"In Nature"	Making Music	Making	23 May 2005
Kellie helps Chats decorate her fish tank. Charli pretends to be a fish exploring a fish tank. Tim watches his new musical flowers bloom; a pop music flower (Kathleen), a blues flower (Nathan), and a marching music flower (Kellie). Charli does a dance while moving like popcorn. Nathan dresses up like a venus flytrap plant and waits for an insect lunch. Charli tries to catch balls while standing still like a venus flytrap. Kathleen arranges some flowers in a vase. Charli makes potpourri by plucking dried rose petals. Sharing Stories: Nathan tells a story about a tadpole (Kellie) who decides to visit her frog grandparents (Charli and Tim) with her friend (Kathleen), before they both change into frogs along the way.
257	2	"A Work of Art"	Making Music	Making	24 May 2005
Kathleen dances while wearing different kinds of hats. Charli puts on different hats used for sport. Tim paints while listening to different pieces of music, which each help him to paint in different ways. Charli makes swirly movements with scarves. Nathan dresses up as a magical creature which he has created in his imagination. Charli paints using her handprints. Kellie tells Chats a poem about an owl on a stormy night, using words to describe the sounds of a storm. Charli practises moving like a lightning bolt. Sharing Stories: Kathleen tells a story about three tubes of paint (Nathan, Kellie, and Tim), who each hope that their painter (Charli) will choose their colour.
258	3	"A Space for Me"	Making Music	Making	25 May 2005
Nathan decorates his space with shapes and colour to make it bright and full of energy. Charli and Nathan dress up as clowns. Kellie is feeling blue, so Chats helps her think of other colours to make her happy. Charli tries to control her busy fingers. Professor Tim tests out a new machine which plays music for different moods. Charli sings "Feelings". Kathleen tries to find a way to blow big bubbles. Charli swings in her hoop like a floating bubble. Sharing Stories: Charli tells a story about two sisters (Kathleen and Kellie) who turn a box into a fairy racer, before their brothers (Tim and Nathan) decide to use it as a wizard mobile.
259	4	"A Surprise"	Making Music	Making	26 May 2005
Kathleen makes a surprise breakfast for her mother. Charli makes an egg shape with her body and rolls around. Kellie tries to cure Chats's hiccups with a tongue twister. Charli tries to find a way to give Kathleen a surprise. Tim and Kellie test out a musical invention he has made as a surprise for Kathleen's birthday. Charli wraps surprise presents for the rest of Hi-5. Nathan cooks a pasta surprise: spaghetti. Charli wobbles like spaghetti. Sharing Stories: Tim tells a story about a group of monkeys (Charli, Nathan, and Kellie) who plan a party for the youngest monkey (Kathleen), who thinks they have forgotten her birthday.
260	5	"Things Animals Create"	Making Music	Making	27 May 2005
Nathan and Tim pretend to be weaver ants building a nest for their family. Charli makes a queen ant using play dough. Kellie and Chats go on a quest for different nests in the African jungle. Charli moves like a monkey. Tim imagines meeting a spider on a web (Kathleen), while it weaves its web and sings. Charli does a dance featuring spider-like movements. Kathleen makes a nest for a blue bird. Charli pretends to be a blue bird building a nest. Sharing Stories: Charli tells a story about a swarm of worker bees (Tim, Kathleen, and Nathan), who set off to find some new food for their queen (Kellie) to eat when she announces she'd like a change from honey.
261	6	"Nature"	Ch-Ch-Changing	Changing	30 May 2005
Kathleen paints a picture of the blue ocean on a summer day, before the weather starts to change. Charli pretends to be waves rolling onto the shore. Kellie paints a picture of Chats in front of Uluru before the sky changes colour. Charli draws a circle and turns it into different things. Tim goes fishing in his sailboat and listens to the sounds of the sea. Charli pretends to go fishing. Nathan pretends to be a tree changing through the seasons. Charli rakes up colourful autumn leaves. Sharing Stories: Nathan tells a story about three sisters (Charli, Kellie, and Kathleen) who watch the moon (Tim) change its shape over time, through their bedroom window at night.
262	7	"People"	Ch-Ch-Changing	Changing	31 May 2005
Kathleen uses cardboard boxes to builds a house for a family of toy dolls to move into. Charli takes her family of toes for a swim when she dips her feet in a paddling pool. Nathan works a doctor and gives a family of boxes a check-up. Charli sings about feeling happy and healthy. Tim performs an opera for the rest of Hi-5 while acting out all of the parts. Charli performs a disco dance while dressed as a dragon. Kellie uses dress-ups to show Chats how she has changed over time, after looking through an old photo book. Sharing Stories: Kathleen tells a story about an old washing machine (Nathan), who gets used incorrectly by a family (Tim, Kellie, and Charli), leading to a mixed-up load of laundry.
263	8	"The World"	Ch-Ch-Changing	Changing	1 June 2005
Kathleen goes for a ride in a hot air balloon. Charli blows bubbles of different sizes. Nathan invents a flying machine that can travel in the air, float on the ocean, and journey to outer space. Charli poses a game; to guess if she is pretending to swim in the water, fly in the air, or walk on the land. Tim imagines what Johann Sebastian Bach would think about contemporary instruments. Charli uses a table as an imaginary piano. Kellie gives Chats a get-well card when she is feeling sick, with pictures inside that tell a story. Charli sends a get-well message to a friend using sign language. Sharing Stories: Kellie tells a story about two robots (Tim and Nathan) who work in a factory, before the manager (Charli) hires a new machine (Kathleen) to get the job done quicker.
264	9	"In Your Home"	Ch-Ch-Changing	Changing	2 June 2005
Kellie misinterprets what Chats means when she asks her guests to "bring a plate" to her barbecue. Charli goes for a skate on her shoes with wheels. Nathan goes on an imaginary adventure using a table. Charli uses her table to make a cubby. Tim dresses up in magical clothes which make him think of the music that matches them. Charli does some hula dancing with Tim's Hawaiian shirt. Kathleen positions paving stones in a corner of the garden to create a place to sit. Charli tries to find a way to get comfortable and relax. Sharing Stories: Kellie tells a story about a family of different birds (Nathan, Charli, Tim, and Kathleen) who try to decide which of the group has the best bird call.
265	10	"Changing Shape"	Ch-Ch-Changing	Changing	3 June 2005
Kellie performs a magic trick for Chats, which uses rhyming words. Charli pretends to be a magician putting on a magic show. After polishing his recorder, Tim is greeted by a musical genie (Nathan), who grants him three wishes. Charli gives herself three genie wishes to help her dance. Nathan sings about shapes. Charli plays with Nathan's fit ball. Kathleen makes a zucchini roll before Jup Jup changes its shape. Charli makes an imaginary pizza. Sharing Stories: Tim tells a story about three buildings (Charli, Nathan, and Kellie) who watch as a builder (Kathleen) arrives to construct something new in the centre of their area.
266	11	"Games and Sports"	Action Hero	Action	6 June 2005
Nathan hosts a game show called What's That Action?, in which contestants Kellie and Kathleen must guess and perform physical movements. Kathleen rehearses a taekwondo pattern at different speeds when Jup Jup alters the music. Charli does some stretchy exercises like a piece of elastic. Tim and Nathan play a call and response singing game. Charli and the rest of Hi-5 play a copycat action game. Kellie and Chats use the language of semaphore to make up their own messages. Charli uses oven mitts to show how hands can communicate. Sharing Stories: Kellie tells a story about four friends (Tim, Nathan, Charli, and Kathleen) who form a toboggan team and try to find the best positions needed to steer the sled.
267	12	"Jobs"	Action Hero	Action	7 June 2005
Kellie imagines climbing up a mountain to rescue Chats after going indoor rock climbing. Charli pretends to climb up a steep mountain. Kathleen plants a passion fruit vine on a lattice outside, which Jup Jup waters with magic water. Tim becomes the singing operator of an elevator in a department store. Charli becomes a toy tester in a department store. Nathan builds a harbour and pretends to be a lighthouse, guiding ships to the land. Charli goes for a walk before watching the sunrise. Sharing Stories: Tim tells a story about a kangaroo (Kellie) who loves the beach, and wishes that she could participate in the beach carnival like her friends (Charli, Kathleen, and Nathan).
268	13	"Machines and Other Things That Move"	Action Hero	Action	8 June 2005
Nathan looks for a way to shift heavy bricks while working on a building site. Charli tries to find a way to carry a heavy suitcase. Kathleen uses a pulley to lift up bricks in order to build a house for her teddy. Charli builds a tower. Tim invents a machine that doubles his voice, so he can sing a duet with himself. Charli and Kathleen pretend to be twins while wearing the same outfit. Kellie and Chats try to figure out the purpose of a mystery machine. Charli turns her arm into a vacuum cleaner and uses it to clean Kathleen's space. Sharing Stories: Nathan tells a story about three heavy lifting machines (Kellie, Tim, and Charli), who work together to rescue a duck (Kathleen) that is stuck in a pond.
269	14	"Action Heroes"	Action Hero	Action	9 June 2005
Tim plays heroic theme music for a superhero named Hyper Guy (Nathan) while following him around. Charli puts on clothes to help her feel like a superhero. Kathleen dresses up as a superhero, while Jup Jup helps her transform into a beetle. Charli practises her superhero moves. Kellie asks Chats the talking toadstool to grant her a wish and magically turn her into an energetic fairy. Charli is feeling shy and reminds herself of how to feel confident. Nathan pretends to be an active superhero who can move at different speeds. Charli moves like a superhero. Sharing Stories: Charli tells a story about a boy (Tim) who helps a group of superheroes (Kellie, Nathan, and Kathleen) fix their problems, and discovers his own super power in the process.
270	15	"Health and Fitness"	Action Hero	Action	10 June 2005
Nathan creates a healthy new recipe using his favourite foods. Charli makes trail mix as an energy snack for a walk. Kathleen prepares healthy snacks in lunchboxes for Hi-5 to eat. Charli performs a dance about the fruit salad. Tim starts a new fitness regime with a disco dancing workout. Charli does a disco dancing workout. Kellie tries to keep in time with her skipping by following along to Chats's skipping song. Charli plays a game involving jumping, hopping, and skipping. Sharing Stories: Kathleen tells a story about a squirrel (Tim) who forgets to collect nuts for the winter like his friends (Charli, Kellie, and Nathan), when he is preoccupied with singing songs.
271	16	"Welcome"	Come Around to My Place	Visiting	13 June 2005
Nathan makes a smiley face picture to welcome a visitor from far away. Charli moves like an alien creature from outer space. Kellie becomes a repair person and tries to figure out what sound is coming from inside Chats's broken clothes dryer. Charli pretends to be a dishwasher and a tumble dryer. Tim tries to resolve a conflict between a visiting tomcat and a bird in the garden. Charli the bird does a dance with Kellie and Kathleen. Kathleen prepares for a visit from a friend, and notices circle shapes everywhere. Charli makes different sized circle, triangle, and star shapes using her body. Sharing Stories: Nathan tells a story about a spider (Kellie), whose first web gets damaged by the wind, leading her neighbours (Charli, Kathleen, and Tim) to help her repair it.
272	17	"Special Places of Interest"	Come Around to My Place	Visiting	14 June 2005
Kathleen visits the museum, and Jup Jup comes along inside her backpack. Charli pretends to be a tyrannosaurus rex stomping through the forest. Tim visits a musical barbershop, where the barbers sing in harmony. Charli makes a bouquet of paper flowers for a friend. Nathan builds an observatory to look at the stars in outer space through telescopes. Charli pretends to be a shooting star in the night sky. Kellie takes Chats to visit her old treehouse, where they make a time capsule to open in the future. Charli goes for a ride on her swing. Sharing Stories: Tim tells a story about three friends (Charli, Nathan, and Kellie) who are greeted by a shooting star (Kathleen), and try to find a way to get her back into the sky.
273	18	"Hello"	Come Around to My Place	Visiting	15 June 2005
Nathan creates a world greeting for Kellie before she leaves on a trip around the world, so that she can say "hello" anywhere she goes. Charli tests out her new way of saying "hello" to Tim. Tim visits his uncle's office, where he finds that the office sounds make a beat. Kellie visits Chats's Arabic desert tent, where they learn how to say "hello" in different languages. Charli sings the African greeting for "hello". Kathleen decorates a hat for a Brazilian carnival. Charli does a samba dance wearing a Brazilian hat. Sharing Stories: Kathleen tells a story about three white clouds (Kellie, Tim, and Charli) who meet a storm cloud (Nathan), who teaches the friends how to create storms like him.
274	19	"Animal Visits and Visitors"	Come Around to My Place	Visiting	16 June 2005
Nathan prepares beds of different shapes for some animals who come to visit him inside on a rainy day. Charli dresses up as a chicken and does a funky dance. Kellie helps Chats to see things from a different perspective after her clothes get eaten by moths. Charli looks after a puppy visitor who likes to chew her shoes. Tim visits the African jungle to learn a rain dance from a group of gorillas. Charli dresses up as a gorilla for a jungle dance. Kathleen searches the garden to find a noisy possum who visits every night and keeps her awake. Charli dresses up as a koala. Sharing Stories: Charli tells a story about a penguin (Kellie) who meets three other birds (Tim, Nathan, and Kathleen), who are all quite different to her.
275	20	"Imaginary Places, People and Things"	Come Around to My Place	Visiting	17 June 2005
Nathan becomes a knight and helps a lonely dragon (Tim) feel fierce and confident. Charli dresses up as a princess and calls for a drink to be served. Kathleen pretends to be a pirate sailing the seas to search for hidden treasure. Charli sings about finding pirate treasure. Tim dreams of visiting a pretend planet with talking glockenspiel keys, who teach him a song to help him return home. Charli tries to stand as still as a statue, but finds out that she prefers to move around. Kellie and Chats pretend to visit Planet Playful, where everything starts with P. Charli finds words that start with P. Sharing Stories: Kellie tells a story about three teddy bears (Nathan, Kathleen, and Tim) who go on an imaginary indoor pirate adventure in search of a special treasure, which they find with their mother (Charli).
276	21	"Landscapes"	City and Country	City, Country	20 June 2005
Kellie and Chats travel across the country on a train, and play I spy to pass the time. Charli pretends to be a train travelling up a steep hill. DJ Tim and his country friend Nathan compare music from the city and country, and try to combine the two styles together. Charli and Kellie do a bush dance. Kathleen follows street signs in the city to find a park. Charli goes for a walk around Alphabet City. Nathan uses his plastic kitchen equipment to build a miniature city. Charli takes some time to stop and appreciate the beauty in the garden. Sharing Stories: Kathleen tells a story about a farm dog (Tim), who is inspired to build a new kennel after his trip to the city, with the help of his animal friends (Charli, Kellie, and Nathan).
277	22	"Animals"	City and Country	City, Country	21 June 2005
Nathan the farmer builds a fence to keep his animals in the paddock. Kellie tries to guess which animals Chats is putting in her pretend petting farm. Charli feeds a baby lamb with some milk. Tim goes for a walk in the country and meets a farmer (Kathleen), who communicates to her sheepdog (Kellie) through whistling. Charli uses her toy horse and dog to muster up the toy sheep. Kathleen creates a rooster using a pillow, before Jup Jup changes it into another farm animal. Charli dresses herself in clothes made of wool, to keep warm like a sheep. Sharing Stories: Kellie tells a story about a family (Charli, Kathleen, and Tim), who are visited at home by an elephant (Nathan), and discover just how much looking after an elephant really needs.
278	23	"Day and Night"	City and Country	City, Country	22 June 2005
Kathleen rehearses a musical number for a big city show. Charli goes for a walk around the city, to find a sitting place with a view. Nathan turns his space into a city café and watches the city life pass him by. Charli pretends to be a customer, a waiter, and a chef of a French style café. Tim remembers the sounds he heard at night when he visited Kellie in the country. Charli sings "I'm Feeling Fine". Kellie and Chats visit a cave and look for shapes of animals in the stalagmites. Charli uses her hands to make animal shadow puppets behind a screen. Sharing Stories: Charli tells a story about a helicopter (Kathleen) who travels to the desert on her first flight, and asks some animals along the way (Tim and Kellie) to help her find the wildlife photographer (Nathan) she is collecting a package from.
279	24	"Food and Crops"	City and Country	City, Country	23 June 2005
Nathan visits the supermarket to shop for his groceries. Charli unpacks the groceries from her shopping bags. Farmer Kathleen sells some fresh fruit from the orchard at a market stall. Charli arranges a platter of fruit. Tim holds a Cajun feast, and is joined by the rest of Hi-5 to play Cajun music. Charli dances to Cajun music. Kellie and Chats imagine they are the sun and a rain cloud, helping the vegetables in a garden grow. Charli pretends to be a seed in a garden, growing into an apple tree. Sharing Stories: Tim tells a story about a city shopping trolley (Kellie) who ends up in the country, and learns from the farm inhabitants (Kathleen, Charli, and Nathan) where food really comes from.
280	25	"Every Day"	City and Country	City, Country	24 June 2005
Kathleen pretends to be a busy worker in a city office, who has a list of jobs she needs to do. Charli is running late, so quickly gets dressed before she leaves to catch a bus. Kellie finds Chats asleep in her box, so she tries to figure out a way to wake her up. Charli pretends to be an alarm clock, using her arms as the clock hands. Farmer Tim carries out his daily routine, collecting the eggs from his chickens while singing rounds with them. Charli places eggs into an egg carton. Nathan builds a barn, and pretends to be the different animals who live inside. Charli dances like a duck. Sharing Stories: Nathan tells a story about a farm tractor (Tim) who visits the city, and learns about city traffic from two cars (Kellie and Kathleen) and a police officer (Charli).
281	26	"Colours in Nature"	Rainbow 'Round the World	Rainbows	27 June 2005
Kellie climbs a rainbow and tastes Chats's different coloured ice cream while she climbs. Charli bends and arches her body like a rainbow. Tim makes a rainbow necklace as a present for Kellie, before he accidentally breaks it. Charli pretends to be a colourful kite flying in the wind. Kathleen jumps over puddles that the rain has left in the garden. Charli splashes in the puddles on a rainy day. Nathan dresses up as his favourite orange vegetables, and discovers their different shapes. Charli covers her eyes and tries to guess what fruit she is eating. Sharing Stories: Chats tells a story about five friends (Nathan, Kathleen, Tim, Kellie, and Charli), who go on a holiday to the beach, but change their plans when the sky turns grey.
282	27	"Animals"	Rainbow 'Round the World	Rainbows	28 June 2005
Kellie and Chats are visited by a rainbow lorikeet, so they decorate a rainbow tree in the hope that it will return. Charli tries to jump up and touch a rainbow. Nathan the bowerbird searches for blue items to decorate his bower with for a birdhouse party. Charli wonders why the sky and sea are blue. Tim writes a song about a peacock (Nathan) using instruments which express its grand colours. Charli dresses in a sari and dances to Indian music. Kathleen tries to find places for sea creatures to camouflage against in an underwater display. Charli sings "Ready or Not". Sharing Stories: Charli tells a story about a zebra (Tim) who leaves the zoo and hides from the zookeepers (Nathan and Kellie) by camouflaging against black and white buildings, before being brought back to the zoo by a child (Kathleen).
283	28	"Mixing, Making and Discovering"	Rainbow 'Round the World	Rainbows	29 June 2005
Nathan paints a rainbow coloured spider web while dressed as a colourful spider. Charli moves her body to create a kaleidoscope of patterns and colours. Kellie makes a tie-dyed shirt for Chats. Charli figures out which of her colourful clothes are her toe socks, and which are her gloves. Tim composes some music that sounds red and yellow, to match the tie-dyed shirts in the fashion parade. Charli practises her marching for an upcoming parade. Kathleen makes a colourful patchwork blanket for her teddy bear. Charli dances with her blanket. Sharing Stories: Kathleen tells a story about four penguins living in the snow (Kathleen, Nathan, Tim, and Charli), who decorate themselves with colourful items.
284	29	"Colourful"	Rainbow 'Round the World	Rainbows	30 June 2005
Kathleen prepares for a Hi-5 picnic, packing coloured picnic sets for each person. Charli sets up for a picnic underneath a tree. Kellie and Chats brighten up their day with a magical lamp which produces colourful light. Charli is feeling restless and "squoggly", so shakes the feelings away by exercising. Tim and his band of fellow clown musicians try to keep in time during their performance. Charli does some silly walking in large clown shoes. Nathan goes for an imaginary ride on a rainbow-coloured horse that can fly. Charli pretends to fly like an imaginary rainbow horse. Sharing Stories: Kellie tells a story about two friends (Kathleen and Tim), who travel through a rainbow tunnel to a red land where they meet a red ladybird (Nathan), and a yellow land where they meet a yellow butterfly (Charli).
285	30	"Contrast and Affinity"	Rainbow 'Round the World	Rainbows	1 July 2005
Nathan paints a rainbow using the seven rainbow colours. Charli finds ways to move around in a small inside space. Kellie imagines being a colourful fairy who changes the colour of Chats's flowers to a rainbow mix. Charli pretends to be a fluttering fairy. Tim and Kellie dress up in different colourful costumes for a bright and happy performance. Charli and Nathan sing "You and Me". Kathleen decorates some biscuits to make them look like mice, before Jup Jup changes her plans. Charli sings about a pig who is stuck in the mud. Sharing Stories: Nathan tells a story about flower bud (Charli), who longs to grow into a flower as colourful as her friends (Kathleen and Tim), while a busy bee (Kellie) collects pollen from them all.
286	31	"Sports"	T.E.A.M.	Teams	4 July 2005
Kellie and Chats try to find the right hog call they need to attract a pig. Charli pretends to be a show pony in a competition. Kathleen decides to try out for the tennis team, but must change her sport when Jup Jup replaces the ball. Charli plays totem tennis. Tim writes a song for the Hi-5 hopping team to help them keep in time with each other. Charli practises a cheer for her team. Nathan and Tim practise playing silly party games; a sack race, egg-and-spoon race, and a three-legged race. Charli plays a game of pin the tail on the donkey. Sharing Stories: Kathleen tells a story about an alien creature (Tim) who, while playing a game with his friends (Charli and Nathan), gets a ball stuck in his alien body, and must visit the doctor (Kellie).
287	32	"When Am I a Team Player?"	T.E.A.M.	Teams	5 July 2005
Nathan and the Hi-5 synchronised swimming team practise a routine. Charli and the Hi-5 swimming team compete in a medley relay. Kellie and Chats make a thermometer to measure the temperature on a hot day. Charli squeezes fresh juice from oranges. Tim pretends to be a penguin conducting an orchestra composed of his hungry friends. Charli encourages her feet to work together so that she can tap dance. Kathleen becomes an ambulance worker and takes her teddy bear with a sore throat to the hospital. Charli the nurse looks after her patients. Sharing Stories: Kellie tells a story about a girl (Kathleen) who, in the excitement of receiving new dancing dolls (Charli and Tim) for her birthday, accidentally loses her favourite toy monkey (Nathan), leaving the dolls to work together to find him.
288	33	"Animals"	T.E.A.M.	Teams	6 July 2005
Kathleen loads presents on to a sleigh led by a reindeer team, to deliver them to her friends at Christmas time. Charli unwraps a parcel to discover another box inside. Nathan moves like a jellyfish and searches for his friends among the waves of the ocean. Charli pretends to be a crab, snapping with her claws. Tim pretends to be an African oxpecker bird who befriends a hippo (Nathan). Charli pretends to be a hippopotamus. Kellie and Chats pretend to be beavers working together to build a dam in the forest. Charli and Nathan sing "Give it a Go". Sharing Stories: Nathan tells a story about a team of animals (Charli, Kellie, and Kathleen) who accidentally get their soccer ball stuck in a tree (Tim), and must find a way to retrieve it.
289	34	"Cooperation and Communities"	T.E.A.M.	Teams	7 July 2005
Kathleen pretends to be a firefighter and practises her emergency fire drills. Charli practises drills for surf lifesaving at the beach. Tim goes for a ride in a Chinese dragon boat, while beating a drum to keep the paddling in time. Charli goes for an imaginary paddle boat ride, using her legs to row. Nathan finds a way to use cylinder shapes to roll a large building block across the floor. Charli winds down to some calm and relaxing music. When Kellie loses her voice, Chats tries to work out what she is trying to say through charades. Charli gives her tired feet a foot massage after a long walk. Sharing Stories: Tim tells a story about a whale (Nathan) who is beached on a sandbank while water skiing with a mermaid (Charli), and is rescued with the help of a tugboat (Kathleen) and lighthouse (Kellie).
290	35	"Teams"	T.E.A.M.	Teams	8 July 2005
Tim meets a group of aliens who mistake him for a music manager from Mars. Charli dances the Charleston as an audition piece. Nathan becomes the captain of a marching band and helps his team practise walking in time together. Kellie shows Chats a marionette puppet, and then pretends to move like a puppet on strings herself. Charli looks through a photo album and remembers what it was like to be a baby. Kathleen tries to decide on a circus trick to perform while Jup Jup gives her some ideas. Charli pretends to walk across a tightrope. Sharing Stories: Charli tells a story about a lonely king (Tim) who summons a tricky magic jester (Nathan) to help him find something exciting to do: a request which culminates in him forming a band with two other royals (Kellie and Kathleen).
291	36	"World"	Some Kind of Wonderful	Wonderful	11 July 2005
Kathleen uses cooking ingredients to create bubbling lava for a miniature volcano. Charli pretends to be an explosion of lava from a volcano. Kellie shows Chats a kaleidoscope on a rainy day, with a rainbow of colourful patterns inside. Charli looks at different colours and moves in the way they each make her feel. Tim imagines meeting sea creatures while writing a song about the sea, who help him find special sea sounds to include in the song. Charli pretends to be an octopus wobbling its arms under the sea. Nathan explores the shapes of different seashells and arranges them in different ways. Charli and Nathan make the shape of the Sydney Harbour Bridge together, using their bodies. Sharing Stories: Kellie tells a story about a girl (Charli) who uses a pair of jet-powered rocket boots to visit her friends around the world; in the snow (Tim), and the jungle (Nathan and Kathleen).
292	37	"People"	Some Kind of Wonderful	Wonderful	12 July 2005
Nathan pretends to be a tugboat with the job of guiding a large ship into the harbour. Charli and Kathleen have a tug rope competition. Kathleen pretends to be a bus driver taking passengers to the park for a picnic, before she needs to change her way of travel. Tim sings a capella on a camping trip when he forgets to bring his mouth organ. Charli pretends to be a little green frog. Kellie teaches Chats a vocal exercise to help her practise her singing. Charli warms up her fingers and hands before writing. Sharing Stories: Kathleen tells a story about a boy (Tim) who wants to be a firefighter, and spends a day at the station with a real team (Nathan, Charli, and Kellie), helping them during a real emergency.
293	38	"Places"	Some Kind of Wonderful	Wonderful	13 July 2005
Tim imagines visiting the North Pole after he discovers a new snow dome in his collection. Charli pretends to be a floating snowflake and a heavy raindrop. Nathan becomes a warrior who must find a way to travel to the Egyptian pyramids when his horse abandons the chariot. Charli stretches with a sphinx pose and a cobra snake pose. Kellie shows Chats how her bed can be a special place, when it becomes the means for an imaginary journey to the Northern Territory. Charli thinks about how different animals catch their food in different ways. Kathleen tries to decide on a wonderful place in the world to visit for a holiday. Sharing Stories: Tim tells a story about three sandpit toys (Kathleen, Charli, and Nathan) who meet a wombat (Kellie) with a small burrow, and decide to build her a new place to live.
294	39	"Days"	Some Kind of Wonderful	Wonderful	14 July 2005
Nathan dresses up as the Sydney Harbour Bridge for a parade featuring the Wonders of the World. Charli tries to lean like the Leaning Tower of Pisa. Tim gathers up the rest of Hi-5 to celebrate a special drum festival. Charli makes drumming sounds with her feet. Kellie and Chats create "Night Day", a day for pretending that it's night. Charli sings to the stars and moon as she gets ready for sleep. Kathleen makes some new friends when she crafts some sock puppets. Charli says hello and goodbye by waving in small and large ways. Sharing Stories: Charli tells a story about four pets (Kellie, Kathleen, Tim, and Nathan), who all argue about which animal of the group their special day should be dedicated to.
295	40	"Gifts and Treasures"	Some Kind of Wonderful	Wonderful	15 July 2005
When Kellie is feeling upset about her broken music box, Chats cheers her up by dressing up as the ballerina from the box instead. Charli does some balancing poses. Nathan finds a treasure chest with a pirate costume inside, which he uses to dress up as a pirate. Charli the pirate builds up strength by doing push-ups. Tim uses dishes in the kitchen sink to make music while cleaning. Charli comes up with a kitchen sink dance inspired by the washing up. Kathleen blows up a balloon as a surprise gift, before Jup Jup changes its size. Charli pretends to be a balloon getting bigger. Sharing Stories: Nathan tells a story about the teddy bear (Kathleen) of a young girl (Charli), who fears she is not as shiny and new as the other toys (Kellie and Tim).
296	41	"Animals"	Planet Disco	Journeys	18 July 2005
Nathan the snow goose teaches his class of young geese how to fly together in formation. Charli practises her snow goose flying and landing. Kellie pretends to be a homing pigeon, to deliver a message for Chats and return home afterwards. Charli becomes a homing cat who loves to explore, but also loves coming home. Tim pretends to be a bee who performs a special dance to assist his swarm on their search for flowers. Charli dresses up as a bee for a dance featuring bee movements. Kathleen the hermit crab looks for a new shell to live in. Charli moves around like a possum, finding places to hide. Sharing Stories: Nathan tells a story about a swallow (Charli) who decides to teach her babies (Tim and Kellie) how to fly, including the youngest bird (Kathleen), who is worried about leaving the nest.
297	42	"People"	Planet Disco	Journeys	19 July 2005
Tim remembers how he would make up driving songs when he was younger, to pass the time during long car trips with his family. Charli has a break during a long driving trip, to stretch her body. Kellie packs her swag for a camping trip, and teaches Chats the Australian words for camping gear. Charli turns her old sun hat into a bush hat. Kathleen cooks some quesadillas from Mexico before she decides to change her recipe. Charli and Kathleen do a Mexican dance. Nathan rides a camel across the desert, to transport water from the well back to camp. Charli journeys to the desert on a magical flying carpet. Sharing Stories: Charli tells a story about a girl (Kellie) who receives a parcel which has been sent to the wrong address, and travels with her father (Tim) to a farm to deliver it to its rightful owner (Kathleen), after stopping off at a different farmer's address (Nathan) along the way.
298	43	"Places"	Planet Disco	Journeys	20 July 2005
Kathleen goes for a walking trip around Paris, to see the Eiffel Tower and the Arc de Triomphe. Charli sings in French. Kellie and Chats go on an imaginary journey in search of a legendary bunyip. Charli turns her hand into a bunyip. Tim takes his broken xylophone to a factory to get it repaired. Charli pretends to play a giant xylophone by jumping on the keys. Nathan creates a map of his neighbourhood to show his grandmother how to get to his house. Charli and Nathan walk to her grandmother's house while safely crossing the road. Sharing Stories: Kellie tells a story about a squid (Nathan) living in the ocean, who journeys to the edge of the coral reef for a picnic lunch, while meeting some friends along the way (Tim, Charli, and Kathleen).
299	44	"Life"	Planet Disco	Journeys	21 July 2005
Nathan tries to make himself tall enough to see what is making a noise behind a wall. Charli stretches her body to become taller. Kellie helps Chats decide on a job she'd like to have when she's older. Charli pretends to be a racing car driver competing in a race. Tim learns how to play the jaw harp from a silly teacher (Nathan) who teaches him how to relax and wobble. Charli tries to find the difference between jiggling and wobbling. Kathleen crafts a caterpillar as a gift, which can turn into a butterfly. Charli pretends to be a colourful butterfly. Sharing Stories: Tim tells a story about a boot-scooting dancing group (Charli, Kathleen, and Nathan) who welcome a new member (Kellie), and try to help her fit in with their routine.
300	45	"Journeys Through Your Imagination"	Planet Disco	Journeys	22 July 2005
Nathan turns his white bed sheets into snowy mountains as he goes on a climbing adventure. Charli pretends to be a shirt hanging on the clothes line. Kathleen uses her imagination to transform two chairs into equipment for an adventure holiday. Charli uses a rope to skip in different ways. Tim hears strange percussive sounds and tries to imagine an animal that could be making the noise. Charli searches for parts of her body that make honking, clopping, and rattling sounds. Kellie and Chats imagine visiting the fun park and riding on a roller coaster and carousel. Charli plays a ball game at a fair, trying to throw a ball through a ring. Sharing Stories: Kathleen tells a story about two children (Charli and Tim) who have an imaginary excursion at home with their mother (Kellie), when they miss school due to being sick.

== Home video releases ==
Series	DVD Title	Release date (Region 4)	Songs of the Week	Ref.
7	Action Heroes	VHS / DVD: 7 July 2005	Action Hero; T.E.A.M.; Planet Disco	
7	Wonderful Journeys	VHS / DVD: 1 December 2005	Some Kind of Wonderful; Come Around to My Place; Rainbow 'Round the World	
7	Mix it Up	DVD: 6 July 2006	Making Music; Ch-Ch-Changing; City and Country (Note: Labelled as "Home Sweet Home".)	

== Awards and nominations ==
List of awards and nominations received by Hi-5 series 7
Award	Year	Recipient(s) and nominee(s)	Category	Result	Ref.
ADVIA Awards	2006	Action Heroes	Best DVD Marketing Campaign	Won	
APRA Screen Music Awards	2005	Chris Harriott, Leone Carey (for "Making Music")	Best Original Song Composed for a Feature Film, Telemovie, TV Series or Mini-Series	Nominated	
Logie Awards	2006	Hi-5	Most Outstanding Children's Program	Nominated	
