= Hi-5 series 5 =

Hi-5
- Series 5
- Starring: Kellie Crawford; Kathleen de Leon Jones; Nathan Foley; Tim Harding; Charli Robinson
- No. of episodes: 45

Release
- Original network: Nine Network
- Original release: 8 September – 7 November 2003

Series chronology
- ← Previous; Series 4 Next → Series 6

The fifth series of the children's television series Hi-5 aired between 8 September 2003 and 7 November 2003 on the Nine Network in Australia. The series was produced by Kids Like Us for Nine with Helena Harris as executive producer. This series featured the 200th episode.

== Cast ==
=== Presenters ===
- Kellie Crawford – Word Play
- Kathleen de Leon Jones – Puzzles and Patterns
- Nathan Foley – Shapes in Space
- Tim Harding – Making Music
- Charli Robinson – Body Move

== Episodes ==
No. overall	No. in series	Title	Song of the Week	Theme	Original release date
181	1	"Family Celebrations"	Come On and Party	Festivals	8 September 2003
Kellie and Chats celebrate a special spring festival by guessing animals that bounce. Charli jumps in a sack for a sack race. Kathleen creates a crest for the Hi-5 family with symbols to represent each member. Charli sings "Five Senses". Tim is asked to write a song for a surprise party without realising that the party is for him. Charli conveys different emotions with her face. Nathan flies a family of Japanese carp fish kites to celebrate Kodomo no Hi. Charli uses her hands as pretend fishes swimming through the sea. Sharing Stories: Charli tells a story about a family (Kellie, Tim, and Kathleen) who struggle with making decisions, which begins to affect their new baby (Nathan) when they have to choose a name for him.
182	2	"Around the World"	Come On and Party	Festivals	9 September 2003
Nathan performs a traditional English Morris dance to celebrate the first day of spring. Charli performs a maypole dance. Kathleen crafts a flower garland for an Indian festival. Charli welcomes a friend to Hawaii. Tim marches while playing the drums for a lucky Chinese dragon parade. Charli celebrates a Brazilian carnival. Kellie and Chats make colourful cardboard rockets for a festival in Thailand. Charli pretends to be a drop of rain falling from the sky. Sharing Stories: Kathleen tells a story about a girl (Charli) and her friends (Kellie and Nathan) who prepare for a Brazilian carnival and practise dancing the samba.
183	3	"Community Events"	Come On and Party	Festivals	10 September 2003
Kathleen prepares dumplings to celebrate Chinese New Year with a feast. Charli practises eating with chopsticks. Nathan acknowledges the beauty of the Sun by acting out sunrise and sunset. Charli performs a dance to recognise the Sun. Tim meets three hermit crabs at the beach, who are holding a dance contest to compete for a new shell. Charli, Tim, and Nathan pretend to be seagulls competing for a potato chip. Kellie helps Chats to overcome her nerves as they prepare to sing together at a concert. Charli performs a tap dancing routine. Sharing Stories: Tim tells a story about a girl (Kellie) who likes to make others laugh, and her friend (Charli), who encourages her to join a circus act with a clown (Nathan) when his partner (Kathleen) falls sick.
184	4	"Christmas Traditions"	Come On and Party	Festivals	11 September 2003
Nathan wraps his Christmas presents with a variety of paper and boxes of different sizes. Charli decorates the Christmas tree. Kathleen builds a snowman using sand for a summer celebration. Charli unpacks her summer items for a holiday at the beach. Kellie prepares a trifle dessert for Chats as a special gift. Charli sets the table for a Christmas dinner. Tim writes a festive song with the help of the rest of Hi-5. Charli writes a letter to Santa Claus to keep herself occupied on Christmas Eve. Sharing Stories: Kellie tells a story about a lonely Christmas tree (Nathan) that lives on the beach, until it is visited by a family (Kathleen, Charli, and Tim) who decorate and celebrate Christmas with him.
185	5	"Funny Festivals"	Come On and Party	Festivals	12 September 2003
Kellie and Chats hold a festival to celebrate insects. Charli wears a crazy wig for a dance competition. Kathleen runs a costume hire store and helps animals find unusual outfits to dress-up with. Charli decorates her fingers in fancy dress for a night out. Tim and Nathan dress up in a two-person cow costume for a dancing cow festival. Charli pretends to be a dancing cow. Nathan operates a foot-powered transport machine in a race for a foot festival. Charli gives her feet a workout. Sharing Stories: Nathan tells a story about a man (Tim) who struggles to sleep due to noise from the "clanging and banging" festival of his neighbours (Kellie, Kathleen, and Charli).
186	6	"Memories"	Give Five	Family	15 September 2003
Kathleen reflects on when she was a baby as she looks through her memory box. Charli pretends to be a baby growing into a toddler. Nathan looks at photographs of his family members and explores their different appearances. Charli moves around in an old fashioned hoop skirt. Tim thinks about the different styles of music that his father and grandfather played when they were younger. Charli performs a rock and roll jive dance. Kellie tries to remember what her grandfather looks like, with the help of Chats's dress-ups. Charli explores her grandfather's garden. Sharing Stories: Kellie tells a story about two siblings (Kathleen and Nathan) who build a billy cart along with their dog (Tim), and imagine adventuring through the skies before returning home to their mother (Charli).
187	7	"Love"	Give Five	Family	16 September 2003
Kathleen dresses a cardboard cutout person to look like an identical copy of herself. Charli and Kathleen pretend to be twins with matching movements. Nathan builds a tower of boxes to celebrate his Hi-5 family. Charli wears hats that represent the members of her family. Tim explores how different instrument groups are like families with brothers and sisters. Charli counts using her fingers. Kellie and Chats create a special handshake and greeting to represent their friendship. Charli displays special movements which represent a secret code. Sharing Stories: Kathleen tells a story about two children (Tim and Nathan) who both dress up as their favourite superhero, and confront a monster who turns out to be their mother (Kellie).
188	8	"Pets"	Give Five	Family	17 September 2003
Kellie and Chats observe as her pet caterpillar prepares to transform into a butterfly. Charli acts like a tadpole egg growing into a frog. Kathleen organises different groups of shapes while creating a picture of a pig. Charli prepares a space to look after a visiting pet pig. Tim plays slide guitar music while his new pet cat sings along. Charli pretends to be a singing cat. Nathan tries to decide which animal would be the most suitable pet for him. Charli pretends to be a puppy doing tricks. Sharing Stories: Nathan tells a story about a girl (Charli) who struggles to communicate with her dog (Kellie), which leads her to have a dream where she is the pet of a land full of dogs (Tim and Kathleen).
189	9	"Washing Day"	Give Five	Family	18 September 2003
Kellie and Chats carry out their spring cleaning and try to work out what to keep. Charli practises using an old hula hoop. Kathleen bakes a family of gingerbread people, which Jup Jup replaces with animal shapes. Charli pretends to be a gingerbread person running around. Tim swaps jobs with Kellie and Kathleen as they all clean each other's spaces. Charli throws crumpled pieces of paper into the bin. Nathan folds the washing and finds different shapes in his clothes and linen. Charli sorts and folds pairs of socks. Sharing Stories: Tim tells a story about three cleaning items (Kellie, Nathan, and Kathleen) from the kitchen who work together to wash a dirty frying pan (Charli).
190	10	"Working Together"	Give Five	Family	19 September 2003
Nathan sets up a path of winding dominos for a chain reaction of falling blocks. Charli and the rest of Hi-5 perform a chain reaction of different movements. Kellie and Chats write a song to celebrate a friend's birthday with a singing telegram. Charli pretends to be a greeting card delivering a message. Tim invents a new musical instrument using a collection of recycled materials. Charli tries to find new movements to perform. Kathleen runs a pretend daycare for animals and looks after the babies. Charli feeds Tim and Nathan, who are dressed up as babies. Sharing Stores: Charli tells a story about a mouse (Kathleen) who tries to prepare a snack for her grandmother (Kellie) while her brothers (Tim and Nathan) eat all of her cheese.
191	11	"Machines"	Build it Up	Building	22 September 2003
Nathan becomes a hero who uses tools and gadgets to solve problems and help others. Charli bounces on a hopper ball with handles. Kellie and Chats test out an invention which transforms words into a picture. Charli paints a picture using her handprints and footprints. Tim pretends to be a scientist and invents a robot that can play music at different speeds; andante, moderato, and allegro. Charli dances to music played at different tempos. Kathleen builds a pretend racing car before turning it into a motorcycle. Charli operates the different devices that help a car run. Sharing Stories: Charli tells a story about three robots (Tim, Kathleen and Nathan) from a toy factory, who decide to visit the beach and set up an ice cream stand, where they use their factory experience to make ice cream for a customer (Kellie).
192	12	"Dwellings"	Build it Up	Building	23 September 2003
Kellie follows a plan and builds a new room for Chats's box, which is made especially for dancing. Charli draws an imaginary house. Nathan designs a kennel for a dog. Charli measures the length of her space using the size of her footsteps. Tim works with the rest of Hi-5 to construct a small house for making music inside. Charli sings "Give it a Go". Kathleen builds a sandcastle for a pretend family of dragons. Charli assembles a tower using a stack of buckets and knocks it over. Sharing Stories: Tim tells a story about a family of imaginary creatures (Charli, Kellie and Nathan) that love to bounce, and one member (Kathleen) who prefers to read.
193	13	"Tools"	Build it Up	Building	24 September 2003
Kathleen hangs her tools on a pegboard and outlines the shapes with a marker. Charli finds inventive ways to carry her tools and equipment. Nathan works on a road construction site and repairs a broken water pipe under the ground. Charli rides a scooter around an obstacle course. Tim discovers he can make music without instruments, by using his body to make percussion sounds. Charli makes percussion music using her body. Kellie and Chats use a bucket and spade to dig in the sand and build a sandcastle. Charli uses her hands as a bulldozer in the sand. Sharing Stories: Kathleen tells a story about a man (Nathan) who keeps his tool shed tidy, until he discovers that a group of gnomes (Kellie, Charli, and Tim) have been visiting and making a mess every night.
194	14	"Long Ago"	Build it Up	Building	25 September 2003
Nathan pretends to be a Viking who builds a pen for his pet cow. Charli climbs the spiral staircase of a castle. Kellie and Chats imagine living in Ancient Rome and using a sundial to tell the time. Charli crafts a paper fan. Tim makes music with bells typically used for a variety of purposes. Charli moves in different ways to the sounds of bells. Kathleen interprets ancient Egyptian hieroglyphics written on stone tablets. Charli dresses up as a pharaoh queen for an Egyptian dance. Sharing Stories: Nathan tells a story about three friends (Tim, Kellie, and Kathleen) who dress up as knights for a sleepover, and have an adventure preparing for bed along with their mother (Charli).
195	15	"Gardens"	Build it Up	Building	26 September 2003
Kathleen arranges a pattern of plants and rocks in the garden. Charli moves like a growing flower. Nathan cuts the leaves of a tree around the outline of a circle shape. Charli pretends to be a tree with swaying leaves. Tim uses a musical bird scarer to deter a pair of birds from his flower bed. Charli pretends to be a bird pecking with its beak. Kellie and Chats builds a hothouse for the garden to help their plants grow. Charli demonstrates how she moves in different ways according to the weather. Sharing Stories: Kellie tells a story about three young monkeys (Tim, Charli, and Nathan) who forget to return home to their mother (Kathleen) before the river rises, and try to find a safe way back to the jungle.
196	16	"Different Kinds of Water"	Our World	World	29 September 2003
Kathleen collects flowers from the garden and finds a way of transferring the rainwater inside to pour it in a vase. Charli pours water from a jug into a glass. Nathan explores ice cubes and dresses up as a large iceberg. Charli pretends to be a snowman. Tim uses old glasses filled with water at different levels to make flute-like instruments. Charli gives her legs a workout by standing at different levels. Kellie and Chats explore the safety rules shown through pictures around the swimming pool. Charli pretends to be a duck who likes to duck down. Sharing Stories: Charli tells a story about a group of penguins (Tim, Kellie, and Nathan) who cover themselves in snow, to trick a scientist (Kathleen) searching for white penguins.
197	17	"Different Kinds of Land"	Our World	World	30 September 2003
Nathan turns his space into a pretend Mexican desert with open spaces and cactuses. Charli performs a Mexican hat dance around a sombrero. Kathleen draws patterns in the sand to create her own tropical island. Charli makes patterns in the air using rainbow ribbon sticks. Tim makes some outdoor music by stomping on trays of leaves, sticks, and other items collected from the garden. Charli tries to control her dancing feet. Kellie teaches Chats the Arabic words for different things found in the Sahara desert. Charli pretends to be a camel travelling across the desert. Sharing Stories: Nathan tells a story about a farmer (Tim) living with a cow (Charli) and a rooster (Kellie), who accidentally upsets an earth elf (Kathleen) when he removes the mushroom that she lives in.
198	18	"Food"	Our World	World	1 October 2003
Nathan tries to work out how to open a coconut. Charli tries to open a lunchbox and a container inside. Kellie and Chats must improvise at the supermarket when they forget their shopping list. Charli performs a song and dance about fairy bread. Tim plays Indian music on a sitar to accompany an Indian feast, before the dinner plans change. Charli and the rest of Hi-5 pretend to be strands of spaghetti in a pot. Kathleen prepares a pizza in the shape of the Italian flag. Charli pretends to be a stretchy roll of pizza dough. Sharing Stories: Kellie tells a story about a boy (Tim) who loves eating spaghetti, and his family (Nathan, Charli, and Kathleen), who try to encourage him to eat different foods.
199	19	"Earth Treasures"	Our World	World	2 October 2003
Kathleen goes on a pretend expedition underground in search of dinosaur bones. Charli changes her body shape to explore a tunnel. Nathan arranges a collection of rocks from around the world. Charli rocks her teddy bear to sleep. Kellie helps Chats sort out a collection of valuable items that she finds while digging for treasure. Charli prunes a rose bush. Tim goes prospecting in the Australian outback in search for gold. Charli pretends to be a pirate searching for treasure. Sharing Stories: Tim tells a story about a girl (Charli) who visits the museum with her sister (Kathleen), but isn't interested in viewing the dinosaurs (Kellie and Nathan) until she witnesses them come to life.
200	20	"People and Animals"	Our World	World	3 October 2003
Nathan acts as a sheep shearer from New Zealand. Charli pretends to muster a herd of sheep. Kellie and Chats create new names for imaginary combinations of different animals. Charli imagines how different animal combinations might move. Tim goes camping in the South American rainforest and listens to the sounds of bird calls. Charli pretends to be a magpie. Kathleen finds new homes for her toys that match the environments that they belong in. Charli tries to warm herself up on a cold day. Sharing Stories: Kellie tells a story about a muddled man (Tim) and his pets (Charli, Kathleen, and Nathan), who try to act as regular and organised as possible for his sister's visit.
201	21	"I Love to Be"	L.O.V.E.	Happy	6 October 2003
Nathan pretends to be King Neptune, the ruler of an underwater kingdom. Charli thinks of a different way to carry her beach equipment. Kathleen sorts her washing and crafts a sock puppet with the loose clothing items. Charli pretends to be an aeroplane writing a message in the sky. Tim imagines being the conductor of an orchestra, with the others imagining being singing stars of other music styles. Charli performs a choreographed dance while Tim follows along. Kellie and Chats act out a story about an owl who befriends an alien. Charli pretends to be a spaceship spinning around in space. Sharing Stories: Kellie tells a story about a boy (Tim) who wishes that he could be the boss of his family, but struggles to look after his siblings (Kathleen and Nathan) after trading places with his mother (Kathleen) in a dream.
202	22	"Favourite Things"	L.O.V.E.	Happy	7 October 2003
Kathleen gives her feet a bath in a tub of water while Jup Jup adds bubbles. Charli washes her hands in a hand bath. Kellie and Chats sort a collection of items beginning with the letter K. Charli sings about words starting with K while using sign language. Tim gives Kathleen a guitar lesson when he notices she has borrowed one of his favourite guitars to practise with. Charli pretends to play an imaginary piano. Nathan combines two of his favourite things when he makes up a dance featuring shapes. Charli makes different shapes with her body while dancing. Sharing Stories: Charli tells a story about a family (Kathleen, Kellie, and Nathan) who all have colourful and wild long hair and the youngest of the family (Tim), who has short hair, and tries to find a way to help it grow.
203	23	"Favourite Animals"	L.O.V.E.	Happy	8 October 2003
Tim meets a lion and teaches it how to sing along with him. Charli acts out the movements of a duck and an elephant. Kellie and Chats observe an ant farm, which leads them to wonder how ants communicate. Charli sings a song featuring the sounds of different animals. Nathan looks after a pet mouse and prepares a cardboard box house for it. Charli pretends to be a mouse, scampering around. Kathleen decides to dress up as a black and white animal and tries on a variety of costumes. Charli dresses up as a zebra for an energetic dance. Sharing Stories: Nathan tells a story about a rabbit (Kathleen) who tries to be brave when visiting the dentist (Charli) with her auntie (Kellie), where she meets a tiger (Tim) who is just as nervous as herself.
204	24	"I Love to Make"	L.O.V.E.	Happy	9 October 2003
Nathan assembles a clothes rack and decorates it as a robot. Charli tries to dry a wet pair of socks by swinging them around. Kathleen bakes a heart-shaped cake to share with Charli. Charli makes different animal shapes using her hands. Kellie acts as a tape recorder and tries to remember Chats's song to relay it back to her. Charli tries to remember the moves of her dance by performing it in reverse. Tim makes a kite and tries to find a material for the tail that will make an interesting sound. Charli pretends that her hand is a kite. Sharing Stories: Kathleen tells a story about a girl (Charli) who invents a remote-controlled time machine to speed up chores for her father (Nathan), but accidentally uses it to fast forward through her birthday party with her friends (Kellie and Tim).
205	25	"I Love to Go"	L.O.V.E.	Happy	10 October 2003
Kathleen pretends to go surfing before Jup Jup takes away her pretend waves. Charli practises different moves on her surfboard. Kellie and Chats imagine going on holiday to a destination where the beach and the snow exist together. Charli fantasises about going to the bush for her next holiday. Tim imagines visiting an old room in his grandparents' house and exploring the treasures inside. Charli and Tim practise dancing the waltz. Nathan plans a camping trip to the Grand Canyon, and tries to encourage his stubborn donkey to move along with him. Sharing Stories: Tim tells a story about a hungry turtle (Kellie) who searches for a fast way to travel to the farmer's vegetable patch and join her animal friends (Charli, Kathleen, and Nathan) for a meal.
206	26	"Magical Animals"	Dream On	Magic	13 October 2003
Nathan creates a magical dragon costume and wears it while imagining he can fly. Charli pretends to be a dragon doing her daily stretches. Kellie and Chats conjure up the image of a mysterious creature who might be stealing Chats's pickles. Charli sneaks around quietly in search of a pickle. Tim sings a magical song while playing the panpipes in the forest, and attracts a phoenix and dragon. Charli weaves a piece of thread like a spider's web. Kathleen goes on a pretend underwater journey in search of a rare, spotty, and stripy fish. Charli swims through the ocean in search of a mermaid. Sharing Stories: Tim tells a story about a pig (Kellie) who dreams of flying, which leads her to seek flying lessons from her encouraging farmyard friends (Nathan and Kathleen) and a mysterious cat (Charli) with magical powers.
207	27	"Magic in Nature"	Dream On	Magic	14 October 2003
Kathleen tries to perform a magic hat-trick and make a rabbit appear from inside her empty top hat. Charli finds a real rabbit inside a magician's top hat. Nathan experiments with coloured paint and tries mixing different colours. Charli imagines living inside a colourful rainbow. Kellie and Chats prepare for a solar eclipse and decide to make wishes upon the magical phenomenon. Charli pretends to be a shooting star. Tim uses powerful instruments to compose a piece of music with the soundscape of a thunderstorm. Charli performs powerful thunderstorm movements. Sharing Stories: Nathan tells a story about a rainbow (Charli) with faded colours, who seeks the help of those who paint the colours of nature (Tim, Kellie, and Kathleen) to help her return to her colourful self.
208	28	"Magic in Me"	Dream On	Magic	15 October 2003
Nathan performs a magical disappearing trick. Charli makes animal shadows using her hands. Kellie helps Chats to cast a spell which will grant them the wish of friendship. Charli performs a magical spell in the hope of becoming a fast swimmer. Tim imagines being a racing car driver and a painter. Charli puts on hats worn for different jobs. Kathleen explores the patterns of a thunderstorm before Jup Jup makes some silly adjustments to her charts. Charli acts out a silly story about a storm. Sharing Stories: Kathleen tells a story about a girl (Kellie) who takes her nervous pet dragon (Tim) to school for show and tell, where they meet another girl (Charli) and her pet dragon (Nathan), who is also nervous about being seen as big and scary.
209	29	"Magical Dress Up Party"	Dream On	Magic	16 October 2003
Tim meets a leprechaun while preparing for a fancy dress party. Charli performs an Irish dancing routine. Kellie shows Chats how octopuses and chameleons are magical creatures; through the way they change their colours to camouflage. Charli searches for different spaces to hide behind and under. Nathan dresses up as a genie and searches for a magical lamp to live in. Charli puts together a genie costume for a fancy dress-up party. Kathleen tries to decide on a magical creature costume to wear to a dress-up party. Sharing Stories: Charli tells a story about a Hi-5 dress-up party, where the guests (Tim, Nathan, Kathleen, Kellie, and Chats) dress as magical creatures, and discover a magical lamp with a space of invisibility.
210	30	"Silly"	Dream On	Magic	17 October 2003
Kellie tricks Chats into believing that a magical meringue has turned her into a monkey. Charli uses a whisk to turn egg whites into a fluffy cloud. Kathleen makes fairy bread in the hope of meeting a fairy. Charli imagines making life-sized shapes with additional versions of herself. Tim discovers a music box which causes him to sing and speak in rhymes. Charli pretends to be an old-fashioned wind-up doll. Nathan uses some left-over food to create a sculpture of a fantastical creature. Charli pretends to be a piece of popcorn in a pot. Sharing Stories: Kellie tells a story about a girl (Kathleen) and her father (Nathan), who receive a bicycle bell from her grandparents (Tim and Charli) in the mail, which magically transports her to their home in Scotland.
211	31	"Jobs"	Ready or Not	Work and Play	20 October 2003
Kellie and Chats follow a jellyfish's instructions to search for sunken treasure in the deep sea. Charli wobbles her arms and legs like a jellyfish. Nathan pretends to work as a chef and prepares a mountain of pastry balls for dessert. Charli washes the dishes and scrubs her cooking pots. Kathleen imagines working in the post office and sorts through different stamps and packages for delivery. Charli pretends to be a pop star while singing into a broomstick. Tim becomes a DJ and tries to find the best tempo for his music at a dance party. Charli dances to disco music. Sharing Stories: Nathan tells a story about a girl (Charli) who starts a new job at a wishing shop and tries to help three customers (Kellie, Tim, and Kathleen) make their wishes come true.
212	32	"Animals"	Ready or Not	Work and Play	21 October 2003
Kathleen runs a pet salon and attends to the mane and claws of her lion customer. Charli looks after three puppies. Nathan pretends to be a drover and tries to move and round up his flock of sheep. Charli pretends to be a brumby galloping around the bush. Tim works as a conductor and leads a trio of singing canaries in a musical performance. Kellie and Chats imagine working as dolphin trainers and using signals to communicate with them. Charli pretends to be a dolphin diving in the ocean. Sharing Stories: Kellie tells a story about a new zookeeper (Tim) who struggles to please his two elephants (Nathan and Kathleen) at the zoo, before a patron (Charli) comes to visit.
213	33	"Street Parade"	Ready or Not	Work and Play	22 October 2003
Nathan and the rest of Hi-5 dress up in cat costumes to wear while marching in a street parade. Charli pretends to lead a street parade while marching at different speeds. Kathleen prepares a juggling act to perform at the street parade. Charli practises cartwheeling. Kellie and Chats play a guessing game and tell a story using mimes and actions. Charli pretends to be a statue who moves when the audience claps. Tim uses old items from around the house as makeshift musical instruments to play in the street parade. Charli stomps around while wearing gumboots. Sharing Stories: Tim tells a story about a troupe of dancing ducks (Kellie, Charli, and Kathleen) who must put their predispositions about the group aside when a dazzling cat (Nathan) auditions to join and brings a new style of moves along with him.
214	34	"Outer Space"	Ready or Not	Work and Play	23 October 2003
Kellie and Chats imagine being astronauts working in space, carrying out jobs on their rocket. Charli sings about diamond stars. Nathan works as a Moon explorer and records his discoveries through sketches in a notebook. Charli mimes the slow motion actions of playing tennis on the Moon. Kathleen prepares food for a journey to outer space in a rocket ship. Charli imagines travelling past all of the planets in space. Tim meets two aliens (Kellie and Nathan) who land on Earth and communicates with them through outer space music. Charli pretends to be an alien dancing to a party song. Sharing Stories: Charli tells a story about a cosmic cleaner (Tim) who seeks the help of two performing stars (Kathleen and Nathan) to distract the Moon (Kellie) so he can clean her.
215	35	"Getting Ready"	Ready or Not	Work and Play	24 October 2003
Nathan travels to work using different methods of transport. Charli moves around in ways other than walking. Kathleen practises quickly getting ready for the day and times her routine. Charli pretends to be a firefighter carrying out a fire drill. Tim runs a music store and provides three different customers with instruments to suit their preferred music style. Charli pretends to work out at an imaginary gym. Kellie and Chats run a sandwich shop and take lunch orders from the rest of Hi-5. Charli stretches her body after working on a computer. Sharing Stories: Kathleen tells a story about a girl (Charli) who spends a day with her father (Tim) at work at the wildlife park, where she sees how he cares for the animals (Nathan and Kellie).
216	36	"Sports"	Holiday	Holidays	27 October 2003
Nathan trains in the surf lifesaving sport of Ironman by swimming, board paddling, and running. Charli pretends to paddle across the river in a kayak. Kellie and Chats write a cheer for a sports team of teddy bears. Charli performs a cheer for her sporting team of teddy bears. Tim prepares for a gumboot-throwing contest on the beach with the rest of Hi-5. Charli practises throwing socks in a competition. Kathleen imagines holidaying in the mountains and travelling down the slopes in a toboggan. Charli pretends to be a figure skater dancing on the ice. Sharing Stories: Kathleen tells a story about a hippopotamus (Nathan) who showcases his hip hop dancing for the animal sports day, and helps the other animals (Charli, Tim, and Kellie) ease their nerves through music.
217	37	"A Time for Me"	Holiday	Holidays	28 October 2003
Nathan tries to pack his suitcases for a mystery holiday which has been planned for him. Charli prepares for bed. Tim practises playing the bagpipes in an independent space to hide away the noise. Charli plays a Scottish drum while practising her marching. Kellie and Chats relax with some quiet time and imagine floating on clouds. Charli relaxes on a beanbag after a visit from a friend. Kathleen practises some yoga exercises outdoors while on holiday. Charli pretends to be a lion dancing in the jungle. Sharing Stories: Nathan tells a story about a cat (Tim) who decides to spend the day sleeping while his owner (Charli) is away, but is interrupted by another neighbourhood cat (Kellie).
218	38	"Family Fun"	Holiday	Holidays	29 October 2003
Nathan revisits his family photo album and remembers the holiday moments that were captured. Charli jumps over a skipping rope. Kellie and Chats craft a family of wooden peg dolls before dressing up as pegs themselves. Charli hangs her washing on a clothes horse. Tim and the Hi-5 family visit the beach and find tropical instruments to play on the sand. Charli applies sunscreen while at the beach. Kathleen prepares for a camping trip with her family and packs her luggage. Charli practises packing away her swag. Sharing Stories: Tim tells a story about a family of rocks (Nathan, Charli, Kellie, and Kathleen) who holiday to the rocky mountains together, where they try out a variety of new activities.
219	39	"Get Fit"	Holiday	Holidays	30 October 2003
Kathleen holidays in London and goes for a walking tour around the city. Charli rides around the countryside of France on a bicycle. Kellie and Chats work out a fitness routine together and use whistles to communicate the different exercises. Charli goes jogging and running around her space. Tim becomes a ranger and helps three different animals develop exercises to match the way they move. Charli jumps forwards and backwards to keep fit. Nathan completes a gymnastics circuit around his space by following diagrams of the actions. Charli uses two tin cans as makeshift dumbbells for weightlifting. Sharing Stories: Charli tells a story about a silly doctor (Tim) who uses unusual methods to cure his patients (Nathan, Kathleen, and Kellie) of the leaps, the wobbles, the hops, and the croaks.
220	40	"Travelling"	Holiday	Holidays	31 October 2003
Nathan travels around Australia in a jeep and explores the rainforest and the desert. Charli pretends to drive a car. Tim returns from a holiday in Bali and plays traditional percussive music on a gamelen. Charli performs a traditional Balinese dance. Kathleen uses a box as a pretend boat for a sailing adventure and goes fishing for lunch. Charli pretends to be a sailor carrying out her duties at sea. Kellie and Chats holiday to the North Pole and observe the Arctic animals from their igloo. Charli dresses up in winter clothes to keep warm in the Arctic. Sharing Stories: Kellie tells a story about a girl (Kathleen) who is taken by her friend (Nathan) on a magical bus ride, which leads them to imaginary lands with unusual people (Tim and Charli).
221	41	"Curiosity"	Underwater Discovery	Discovery	3 November 2003
Nathan walks across a balance beam and explores how seesaws balance. Charli practises balancing in different positions. Kellie and Chats use a torch to light up the dark while exploring in a cave. Charli pretends to mine and dig for gold in the ground. Tim experiments with trying different ringtones on his mobile phone. Charli pretends to call Kathleen over the telephone. Kathleen measures her plants and flowers to see if they have grown. Charli explores how ladybirds and eagles move and compares how they each fly. Sharing Stories: Nathan tells a story about two alien creatures (Kathleen and Kellie) who use their camouflaging exteriors to trick and hide from two astronauts (Charli and Tim) on their home planet.
222	42	"Mysteries"	Underwater Discovery	Discovery	4 November 2003
Nathan experiments with sponges of different shapes and sizes while cleaning. Charli moves like a sponge by bending and stretching her body. Kathleen pretends to be a detective to uncover who has been taking her missing jellybeans. Charli searches for something important. Tim hears a mystery sound and discovers three ants singing and playing musical instruments. Charli pretends to be a giant ant. Kellie and Chats hear a sound coming from inside a package and try to determine what is it is. Charli opens a package and tries to guess what is inside. Sharing Stories: Tim tells a story about a young princess (Charli) living in a castle, who doesn't like to sing in the same loud way that her royal family (Kathleen and Kellie) does, which leads her to befriend a quiet dragon (Nathan).
223	43	"Other Worlds"	Underwater Discovery	Discovery	5 November 2003
Kathleen makes different pictures using a collection of star shapes. Charli performs a stretching routine inspired by stars. Kellie and Chats pretend to visit an imaginary planet where everything is said and done in the opposite way. Charli explores small and large movements. Tim goes skydiving and listens to the different sounds while floating through the sky. Charli and Kellie turn a fitted bed sheet into a parachute to play with. Nathan presents a parade featuring the Sun, and planets of the Solar System. Charli makes a little spaceship and launches it into outer space. Sharing Stories: Charli tells a story about three sea creatures (Tim, Nathan, and Kathleen) who attend the first day of school with their eel teacher (Kellie), and explore the ocean for show and tell.
224	44	"Fantasy"	Underwater Discovery	Discovery	6 November 2003
Kellie explores a magical forest while Chats disguises herself as a talking log. Charli discovers how body language can show how someone is feeling. Nathan plays with balloons and tries to keep them all in the air at once. Charli tries to keep a balloon off the ground without using her hands. Tim invents a way to collect different styles of music to keep in containers and sell. Charli sings a song about a jillaroo working on the land. Kathleen experiments with magnets and makes a kite which uses magnets to fly. Charli crafts a paper kite. Sharing Stories: Kathleen tells a story about two adventurous polar bears (Kellie and Tim) who sail out to sea on an iceberg, and meet two people (Charli and Nathan) on the tropical island which they land at.
225	45	"Experiments"	Underwater Discovery	Discovery	7 November 2003
Kellie pretends to be the test pilot of a giant paper aeroplane while communicating with Chats in the control tower. Charli makes paper aeroplanes. Nathan measures the height of everyone in Hi-5 and compares the results. Charli stretches her arms to make herself appear taller. Tim pretends to be a scientist and experiments to create a musical mixture. Charli claps her hands in different ways. Kathleen fills glasses of juice to different levels and discovers that they can be used as musical chimes. Charli stays hydrated while performing an energetic dance. Sharing Stories: Kellie tells a story about a boy (Nathan) who plays with mud outside and imagines turning into a blob of blue mud himself along with his siblings (Charli and Tim), unbeknownst to their mother (Kathleen).

== Home video releases ==
Series	DVD Title	Release date (Region 4)	Songs of the Week	Special features	Ref.
5	It's a Hi-5 Christmas	VHS / DVD: 12 November 2003	Sleigh Ride	Christmas Eve concert featurette	
5	Hi-5 Holiday	VHS / DVD: 8 April 2004	Holiday; Underwater Discovery; Give Five	—N/a	
5	Come On and Party	VHS / DVD: 8 July 2004	Come On and Party; Build it Up; L.O.V.E.	—N/a	
5	Space Magic	VHS / DVD: 7 October 2004	Hi-5 Base to Outer Space; Dream On; I Believe in Magic	—N/a	
6	Space Magic	VHS / DVD: 7 October 2004	Hi-5 Base to Outer Space; Dream On; I Believe in Magic	—N/a	

== Awards and nominations ==
List of awards and nominations received by Hi-5 series 5
Award	Year	Recipient(s) and nominee(s)	Category	Result	Ref.
Logie Awards	2004	Hi-5	Most Outstanding Children's Preschool Program	Won	
