= Hi-5 series 6 =

Hi-5
- Series 6
- Starring: Kellie Crawford; Kathleen de Leon Jones; Nathan Foley; Tim Harding; Charli Robinson
- No. of episodes: 30

Release
- Original network: Nine Network
- Original release: 18 October – 26 November 2004

Series chronology
- ← Previous; Series 5 Next → Series 7

The sixth series of the children's television series Hi-5 aired between 18 October 2004 and 26 November 2004 on the Nine Network in Australia. The series was produced by Kids Like Us for Nine with Helena Harris as executive producer. The series serves as a "best of" collection, compiling segments which originally aired as part of the fourth and fifth series, while debuting new songs of the week. The series debuted simultaneously in Australia and the United Kingdom.

== Cast ==
=== Presenters ===
- Kellie Crawford – Word Play
- Kathleen de Leon Jones – Puzzles and Patterns
- Nathan Foley – Shapes in Space
- Tim Harding – Making Music
- Charli Robinson – Body Move

== Episodes ==
No. overall	No. in series	Title	Song of the Week	Theme	Original release date
226	1	"Outer Space"	Hi-5 Base to Outer Space	Exploring	18 October 2004
Kellie and Chats imagine being astronauts working in space, carrying out jobs on their rocket. Charli pretends to be a spaceship spinning around in space. Nathan works as a Moon explorer and records his discoveries through sketches in a notebook. Charli imagines playing football on the Moon. Kathleen prepares food for a journey to outer space in a rocket ship. Charli imagines travelling past all of the planets in space. Tim meets two aliens (Kellie and Nathan) who land on Earth and communicates with them through outer space music. Charli pretends to be an alien dancing to a party song. Sharing Stories: Nathan tells a story about two alien creatures (Kathleen and Kellie) who use their camouflaging exteriors to trick and hide from two astronauts (Charli and Tim) on their home planet.
227	2	"Our World"	Hi-5 Base to Outer Space	Exploring	19 October 2004
Nathan goes on an underground mining adventure in search of precious rocks and gemstones. Charli pretends to mine and dig for gold in the ground. Kellie and Chats holiday to the North Pole and observe the Arctic animals from their igloo. Charli tries to warm herself up on a cold day. Tim goes skydiving and listens to the different sounds while floating through the sky. Charli pretends that her hand is a kite. Kathleen uses a globe and a lamp to explore how daytime and nighttime is created around the world. Charli performs a dance to recognise the Sun. Sharing Stories: Charli tells a story about a silly pair of explorers (Tim and Kellie) who challenge themselves to find the silliest town in Australia, where they meet the mayor (Nathan) and a kangaroo (Kathleen) along the way.
228	3	"New Ideas"	Hi-5 Base to Outer Space	Exploring	20 October 2004
Kathleen choreographs a dance and uses symbols to represent the movements on instruction cards. Charli plays musical statues and dances in a silly way. Nathan plays with balloons and tries to keep them all in the air at once. Charli plays with balloons. Tim collects different sounds made by the body and compiles them into a song using a recording machine. Charli sings a song featuring the sounds of different animals. Kellie and Chats pretend to visit an imaginary planet where everything is said and done in the opposite way. Charli bounces on a hopper ball with handles. Sharing Stories: Charli tells a story about a family (Kathleen, Kellie, and Nathan) who all have colourful and wild long hair and the youngest of the family (Tim), who has short hair, and tries to find a way to help it grow.
229	4	"World of Nature"	Hi-5 Base to Outer Space	Exploring	21 October 2004
Tim meets a lion and teaches it how to sing along with him. Charli explores how ladybirds and eagles move and compares how they each fly. Kellie and Chats explore the different types of ears that a range of animals have. Charli pretends to be a singing cat. Nathan looks after a pet mouse and prepares a cardboard box house for it. Charli pretends to be a mouse scurrying around the house. Kathleen pretends to be a honey bee checking on the baby bee eggs in the hive. Charli pretends to be a sunflower growing in the sunlight. Sharing Stories: Kellie tells a story about two siblings (Kathleen and Nathan) who build a billy cart along with their dog (Tim), and imagine adventuring through the skies before returning home to their mother (Charli).
230	5	"The Past"	Hi-5 Base to Outer Space	Exploring	22 October 2004
Tim pretends to be a Tyrannosaurus rex making music with prehistoric landmarks. Charli dresses up as a dancing dinosaur. Kellie and Chats imagine living in Ancient Rome and using a sundial to tell the time. Charli moves around in an old fashioned hoop skirt. Nathan goes on a pretend deep sea diving adventure and discovers sunken treasure. Charli pretends to be a pirate searching for treasure. Kathleen interprets ancient Egyptian hieroglyphics written on stone tablets. Charli dresses up as a pharaoh queen for an Egyptian dance. Sharing Stories: Charli tells a story about a professor (Tim) and a doctor (Kathleen) who decide to investigate an ancient tribe of people called the "Yuck Yucks", and find out why they were inclined to laugh a lot.
231	6	"Fantasy Fun"	I Believe in Magic	Dream Wishes	25 October 2004
Kellie and Chats visit an aquarium in their imagination. Charli uses her hands as pretend fishes swimming through the sea. Nathan plays a video game in which he is transported into his computer to become a superhero. Charli wears a cape which gives her super powers. Kathleen makes fairy bread in the hope of meeting a fairy. Charli sings about diamond stars. Tim climbs a mountain and listens to the echo of his voice at the summit. Charli pretends to be a tin can being knocked over by a ball. Sharing Stories: Nathan tells a story about a girl (Kellie) who dreams of travelling down a jungle river on her bed, where she meets a hippopotamus (Tim), a toucan (Kathleen), and a jungle girl (Charli).
232	7	"Adventures"	I Believe in Magic	Dream Wishes	26 October 2004
Kellie and Chats paddle a canoe in search of a crocodile. Charli pretends to paddle across the river in a kayak. Tim imagines visiting the Land of the Brass Blowers, where they speak using brass instruments. Charli mimes the actions of playing different instruments. Nathan goes on an African safari and discovers different animals along the way. Charli pretends to explore the jungle and swim under the sea. Kathleen goes on a pretend underwater journey in search of a rare, spotty, and stripy fish. Charli pretends to be a shark trying to scare the fish. Sharing Stories: Tim tells a story about a girl (Charli) who visits the museum with her sister (Kathleen), but isn't interested in viewing the dinosaurs (Kellie and Nathan) until she witnesses them come to life.
233	8	"I Wish"	I Believe in Magic	Dream Wishes	27 October 2004
Kathleen sings opera while matching the pitches of musical glasses filled to different levels. Charli runs a pretend hair salon. Nathan pretends to be an astronaut landing on the Moon and playing a space ball game with a Moon creature. Charli pretends to be a magical bush creature. Kellie helps Chats become a racing car driver using a cardboard box as her racing car. Charli performs a magical spell in the hope of becoming a fast swimmer. Tim sings a magical song while playing the panpipes in the forest, and attracts a phoenix and dragon. Sharing Stories: Nathan tells a story about a girl (Charli) who starts a new job at a wishing shop and tries to help three customers (Kellie, Tim, and Kathleen) make their wishes come true.
234	9	"Magic in Me"	I Believe in Magic	Dream Wishes	28 October 2004
Nathan dresses up as a genie and searches for a magical lamp to live in. Charli practises her magical genie movements. Kathleen tries to perform a magic hat-trick and make a rabbit appear from inside her empty top hat. Charli performs a magical disappearing trick. Kellie and Chats prepare for a solar eclipse and decide to make wishes upon the magical phenomenon. Charli pretends to be a sailor carrying out her duties at sea. Tim uses symbols to help Kellie and Nathan write down the music playing through their minds, before they play the song on their imaginary instruments. Charli tries to play the drums for the first time. Sharing Stories: Kellie tells a story about a boy (Tim) who wishes that he could be the boss of his family, but struggles to look after his siblings (Kathleen and Nathan) after trading places with his mother (Kathleen) in a dream.
235	10	"Big Dreams"	I Believe in Magic	Dream Wishes	29 October 2004
Kathleen holidays in London and goes for a walking tour around the city. Tim imagines being the conductor of an orchestra, with the others imagining being singing stars of other music styles. Charli pretends to play an imaginary piano. Kellie and Chats imagine going on holiday to a destination where the beach and the snow exist together. Charli imagines living inside a colourful rainbow. Nathan pretends to be King Neptune, the ruler of an underwater kingdom. Charli pretends to be a fish. Sharing Stories: Tim tells a story about a girl (Kellie) who likes to make others laugh, and her friend (Charli), who encourages her to join a circus act with a clown (Nathan) when his partner (Kathleen) falls sick.
236	11	"Get Moving"	Do It All Again	Get Moving	1 November 2004
Nathan trains in the surf lifesaving sport of Ironman by swimming, board paddling, and running. Charli practises different moves on her surfboard. Kathleen finds a new and creative way to exercise the muscles in her body. Charli stretches her muscles before dancing. Kellie and Chats do the cancan and discuss the names that other dances have. Charli performs an energetic dance. Tim prepares for a gumboot-throwing contest on the beach with the rest of Hi-5. Charli practises a taekwondo routine. Sharing Stories: Kellie tells a story about three young monkeys (Tim, Charli, and Nathan) who forget to return home to their mother (Kathleen) before the river rises, and try to find a safe way back to the jungle.
237	12	"Get Moving Together"	Do It All Again	Get Moving	2 November 2004
Kellie completes her soccer training inside on a rainy day, while Chats acts as her coach. Charli and Kathleen practise playing hockey. Nathan paddles down an imaginary river in a pretend boat. Charli pretends to paddle across the river in a kayak. Kathleen pretends to go surfing before Jup Jup takes away her pretend waves. Charli pretends to be a dolphin diving in the ocean. Tim plays funky punk music in his space, but is not sure if the rest of Hi-5 will enjoy it too. Charli wears a crazy wig for a dance competition. Sharing Stories: Tim tells a story about a troupe of dancing ducks (Kellie, Charli, and Kathleen) who must put their predispositions about the group aside when a dazzling cat (Nathan) auditions to join and brings a new style of moves along with him.
238	13	"Get Moving Creatively"	Do It All Again	Get Moving	3 November 2004
Nathan finds a way to wear all of his cleaning items at once to help him clean his space. Charli pretends to be a washing machine. Kellie invents a musical mat which allows her to dance along to three different styles of music. Charli performs a dance inspired by the fruit salad. Tim becomes a ranger and helps three different animals develop exercises to match the way they move. Charli pretends to be a duck who likes to duck down. Kathleen sets up an obstacle course outside using the garden equipment. Charli pretends to be a mouse, scampering around. Sharing Stories: Tim tells a story about a hungry turtle (Kellie) who searches for a fast way to travel to the farmer's vegetable patch and join her animal friends (Charli, Kathleen, and Nathan) for a meal.
239	14	"Machines"	Do It All Again	Get Moving	4 November 2004
Kellie and Chats pretend to pilot a helicopter around the world. Charli moves her arms like the rotors of a helicopter. Tim pretends to be a scientist and invents a robot that can play music at different speeds; andante, moderato, and allegro. Charli pretends to be a robot that is powered by the sun. Nathan becomes a hero who uses tools and gadgets to solve problems and help others. Charli rides a scooter around an obstacle course. Kathleen builds a pretend racing car before turning it into a motorcycle. Charli sings "Give it a Go". Sharing Stories: Kathleen tells a story about a girl (Charli) who invents a remote-controlled time machine to speed up chores for her father (Nathan), but accidentally uses it to fast forward through her birthday party with her friends (Kellie and Tim).
240	15	"Get Moving Outside"	Do It All Again	Get Moving	5 November 2004
Kathleen imagines holidaying in the mountains and travelling down the slopes in a toboggan. Charli pretends to go skiing down a mountain. Nathan works on a road construction site and repairs a broken water pipe under the ground. Charli drives an imaginary car. Kellie and Chats discover things starting with S while sitting on the sand, from sandcastles to starfish. Charli uses her energy to skip with a rope. Tim uses a snare drum to replicate the sounds of ocean waves rolling onto the beach. Charli practises swimming strokes. Sharing Stories: Kathleen tells a story about a girl (Charli) who builds a snowman (Nathan), and witnesses it come to life while her father (Tim) is busy working.
241	16	"I Love to Do"	How Much Do I Love You?	Heartbeat	8 November 2004
Tim works as a conductor and leads a trio of singing canaries in a musical performance. Charli and Kathleen practise for a three-legged race. Kellie and Chats run a sandwich shop and take lunch orders from the rest of Hi-5. Charli plays a guessing game about fruit. Kathleen prepares for a weekend trip away and makes a list to remember the things she needs to pack. Charli demonstrates her bathroom routine. Nathan cuts the leaves of a tree around the outline of a circle shape. Charli prunes a rose bush. Sharing Stories: Kellie tells a story about a forgetful family (Charli, Nathan, Kathleen, and Tim) who arrive for an outing at the beach and unpack their belongings from the car.
242	17	"Close to Me"	How Much Do I Love You?	Heartbeat	9 November 2004
Kellie shows Chats her memory book and reminisces about when she was a baby. Charli pretends to be a baby growing into a toddler. Nathan collects a group of special items to send to a friend living overseas. Charli wears hats that represent the members of her family. Kathleen sorts photographs of herself on different sporting teams, to display in a special frame. Tim thinks about the different styles of music that his father and grandfather played when they were younger. Charli and Kathleen pretend to be twins with matching movements. Sharing Stories: Charli tells a story about a family (Kellie, Tim, and Kathleen) who struggle with making decisions, which begins to affect their new baby (Nathan) when they have to choose a name for him.
243	18	"Working it Out"	How Much Do I Love You?	Heartbeat	10 November 2004
Kathleen runs a pretend daycare for animals and looks after the babies. Charli feeds Tim and Nathan, who are dressed up as babies. Tim builds a kennel for his dog which contains ways of making music inside. Charli makes up a dance for a dog. Nathan asks Tim to assist him as he builds a teepee, using a sheet to wrap around bamboo poles. Charli tries to whistle for the first time. Kellie celebrates Chats's birthday party with some surprise guests. Charli tries to carry a piece of cake without dropping it. Sharing Stories: Tim tells a story about a herd of ordinary cows (Kellie, Kathleen, and Nathan) who grow tired of their usual routine, and are inspired by an energetic new cow (Charli) to find a new groove.
244	19	"Heart"	How Much Do I Love You?	Heartbeat	11 November 2004
Kellie is given a necklace as a present from Chats, with a photograph of herself inside. Charli pretends to be an aeroplane writing a message in the sky. Tim gives Kathleen a guitar lesson when he notices she has borrowed one of his favourite guitars to practise with. Charli sings "Five Senses". Kathleen creates a crest for the Hi-5 family with symbols to represent each member. Nathan designs a kennel for a dog. Charli looks after three puppies. Sharing Stories: Kathleen tells a story about a girl (Charli) who spends time playing with her new doll (Kellie), leading her old toys (Nathan and Tim) to feel neglected.
245	20	"Making"	How Much Do I Love You?	Heartbeat	12 November 2004
Nathan sets up a path of winding dominos for a chain reaction of falling blocks. Charli gets her two hands to work together and clap. Kellie and Chats play a skipping game with a rope. Charli forms a conga line with the rest of Hi-5. Kathleen dresses a cardboard cutout person to look like an identical copy of herself. Charli plays a copycat game with Tim matching her movements. Tim works with the rest of Hi-5 to construct a small house for making music inside. Charli draws an imaginary house. Sharing Stories: Nathan tells a story about a wobbly wall (Charli) who comes together with three other walls (Kellie, Tim, and Kathleen) to form a stable building.
246	21	"Happy"	I'm Feeling Fine	Feeling Fine	15 November 2004
Kathleen works as a ranger and goes on patrol in a national park. Charli sings a song about a jillaroo working on the land. Tim experiments with trying different ringtones on his mobile phone. Charli pretends to be a pop star while singing into a broomstick. Kellie relaxes in a hammock and thinks of other words that start with H. Charli moves like a creeping fox. Nathan looks at photographs of his family members and explores their different appearances. Charli sings about feeling proud and happy to be herself. Sharing Stories: Nathan tells a story about a young star (Kellie) who is yet to shine, which leads her to seek advice from the other stars (Charli and Kathleen) and the keeper of the night sky (Tim), to help her begin to sparkle.
247	22	"Having Fun"	I'm Feeling Fine	Feeling Fine	16 November 2004
Kathleen creates an imaginary beach indoors with pretend sand and sea. Charli plays on the sand and looks for shells before going for a swim. Tim goes camping in the bush and listens to the sounds of nature around him. Charli practises packing away her swag. Nathan completes a gymnastics circuit around his space by following diagrams of the actions. Charli pretends to work out at an imaginary gym. Kellie and Chats write a cheer for a sports team of teddy bears. Charli actualises the dance moves from inside her head. Sharing Stories: Kellie tells a story about a boy (Tim) who dresses up as his favourite superhero for a birthday party planned by his mother (Charli), before his friends (Nathan and Kathleen) arrive wearing the same costume as him.
248	23	"Strong and Brave"	I'm Feeling Fine	Feeling Fine	17 November 2004
Kellie repurposes Nathan's old superhero costume as a new one for herself. Charli pretends to be a firefighter carrying out a fire drill. Tim uses powerful instruments to compose a piece of music with the soundscape of a thunderstorm. Kathleen pretends to explore an island bay in a boat and navigate her way towards the lighthouse. Charli pretends to be a dolphin diving in the deep sea. Nathan pretends to be a Viking who builds a pen for his pet cow. Charli pretends to be a lion dancing in the jungle. Sharing Stories: Kathleen tells a story about a girl (Kellie) who takes her nervous pet dragon (Tim) to school for show and tell, where they meet another girl (Charli) and her pet dragon (Nathan), who is also nervous about being seen as big and scary.
249	24	"Ideas"	I'm Feeling Fine	Feeling Fine	18 November 2004
Kellie feels angry after dropping a cake she baked, and finds ways to calm herself down with Chats. Charli moves around in a grumpy way. Tim and Kathleen play a musical game where they must sing in opposite ways to each other. Charli explores opposite movements. Kathleen finds new homes for her toys that match the environments that they belong in. Charli discovers how body language can show how someone is feeling. Nathan invents a "mood-ometer" which displays the particular emotions he may be feeling. Charli conveys different emotions with her face. Sharing Stories: Kathleen tells a story about the prince (Tim) of a palace, who is rude to his servants and friends (Nathan, Charli, and Kellie), and fails to respect them, leading them to feel unappreciated.
250	25	"Celebrations"	I'm Feeling Fine	Feeling Fine	19 November 2004
Kellie and Chats dress up in colourful costumes for a Brazilian carnival parade. Charli dances to disco music. Nathan revisits his family photo album and remembers the holiday moments that were captured. Charli fantasises about going to the bush for her next holiday. Kathleen runs a costume hire store and helps animals find unusual outfits to dress-up with. Charli dresses up as a zebra for an energetic dance. Tim becomes a DJ and tries to find the best tempo for his music at a dance party. Charli decorates her fingers in fancy dress for a night out. Sharing Stories: Kathleen tells a story about a hippopotamus (Nathan) who showcases his hip hop dancing for the animal sports day, and helps the other animals (Charli, Tim, and Kellie) ease their nerves through music.
251	26	"Outside Play"	Snakes and Ladders	Playtime	22 November 2004
Nathan practises surfing in preparation for a day at the beach. Charli applies sunscreen while at the beach. Kellie and Chats follow a jellyfish's instructions to search for sunken treasure in the deep sea. Charli swims through the ocean in search of a mermaid. Tim and the Hi-5 family visit the beach and find tropical instruments to play on the sand. Charli acts like a sailor carrying out her duties at sea. Kathleen prepares a dress-up game for Kellie, with the pieces of an adventuring outfit hidden in her wall. Charli adventures in the Congo rainforest. Sharing Stories: Tim tells a story about a young princess (Charli) living in a castle, who doesn't like to sing in the same loud way that her royal family (Kathleen and Kellie) does, which leads her to befriend a quiet dragon (Nathan).
252	27	"Pretend Play"	Snakes and Ladders	Playtime	23 November 2004
Tim imagines being a racing car driver and a painter. Charli pretends to drive a car. Kathleen pretends to be a joey living inside a kangaroo pouch. Charli bounds around the bush like a kangaroo. Nathan acts as a sheep shearer from New Zealand. Charli pretends to muster a herd of sheep. Kellie tries on hats worn for different jobs, and tries to decide which would be the best job for her. Charli puts on hats worn for different jobs. Sharing Stories: Nathan tells a story about three friends (Tim, Kellie, and Kathleen) who dress up as knights for a sleepover, and have an adventure preparing for bed along with their mother (Charli).
253	28	"Number Play"	Snakes and Ladders	Playtime	24 November 2004
Nathan pretends to be a drover and tries to move and round up his flock of sheep. Charli invents a game which combines different movements. Kathleen works at a stall selling items and clothes from faraway countries. Charli counts using her fingers. Tim plays a gong from China and makes music using the pentatonic scale. Charli practises eating with chopsticks. Kellie and Chats work out a fitness routine together and use whistles to communicate the different exercises. Charli imagines making life-sized shapes with additional versions of herself. Sharing Stories: Nathan tells a story about four different handbags (Kathleen, Charli, Kellie, and Tim) who live in a shop window and wait to be purchased.
254	29	"Pattern Play"	Snakes and Ladders	Playtime	25 November 2004
Nathan practises bush dancing in the shape of a square along with Kellie, Kathleen, and Tim. Charli makes diamond shapes with her fingers and body. Kathleen decides to dress up as a black and white animal and tries on a variety of costumes. Charli pretends to be an albatross. Tim hears a musical rhythm and imagines visiting a city where the rhythm is continuously repeated. Charli creates kaleidoscope patterns in the air using her fingers. Kellie and Chats prepare a fruit salad in the shape of a rainbow, using fruit of different colours. Charli matches colours with her feelings. Sharing Stories: Nathan tells a story about a rainbow (Charli) with faded colours, who seeks the help of those who paint the colours of nature (Tim, Kellie, and Kathleen) to help her return to her colourful self.
255	30	"Animal Play"	Snakes and Ladders	Playtime	26 November 2004
Kellie and Chats search for animals that start with the letter A. Charli pretends to be a puppy doing tricks. Nathan uses old clothes to dress up as animals from different habitats around the world. Charli acts out the movements of a duck and an elephant. Kathleen dresses up as a rabbit and searches for carrots to eat. Charli finds a real rabbit inside a magician's top hat. Tim makes music with singing cats from around the world. Charli pretends to be a Siamese cat and a Persian cat. Sharing Stories: Kellie tells a story about a new zookeeper (Tim) who struggles to please his two elephants (Nathan and Kathleen) at the zoo, before a patron (Charli) comes to visit.

== Home video releases ==
Series	DVD Title	Release Date (Region 4)	Songs of the Week	Ref.
5	Space Magic	VHS / DVD: 7 October 2004	Hi-5 Base to Outer Space; Dream On; I Believe in Magic	
6	Space Magic	VHS / DVD: 7 October 2004	Hi-5 Base to Outer Space; Dream On; I Believe in Magic	

== Awards and nominations ==
List of awards and nominations received by Hi-5 series 6
Award	Year	Recipient(s) and nominee(s)	Category	Result	Ref.
Logie Awards	2005	Hi-5	Most Outstanding Children's Program	Nominated	
