= Hoggatt =

Hoggatt may refer to:

- USS Hoggatt Bay (CVE-75), Casablanca-class escort carrier of the United States Navy
- Verner Emil Hoggatt, Jr. (1921–1980), American mathematician
- Wilford Bacon Hoggatt (1865–1938), American naval officer and businessman, sixth Governor of the District of Alaska

== See also ==
- Hogget (disambiguation)
