= Battle of the Choirs =

- Presented by: David Koch
- Judges: Jonathon Welch; Iva Davies; Charli Delaney; George Torbay
- Country of origin: Australia
- Original language: English
- No. of seasons: 1
- No. of episodes: 8

Production
- Running time: 60 minutes (including commercials)
- Production company: Granada Media Australia

Original release
- Network: Seven Network
- Release: 15 June – 3 August 2008

Battle of the Choirs is an Australian reality talent competition that premiered on the Seven Network on 15 June 2008. The show was hosted by David Koch, with the judging panel consisting of Jonathon Welch, Iva Davies, Charli Delaney, and George Torbay.

It was won by the University of Newcastle Chamber Choir.

The format of the show is based on an idea by Swedish singer and chorister Caroline af Ugglas which has been previously adapted by many countries, most notably as Clash of the Choirs in the United States. The series involves 16 community choirs of up to 40 members from around Australia competing against each other in a knockout competition that sees them performing songs from many different musical genres. The winning choral group will receive $100,000 in prize money and a recording deal with Universal Music.

== Structure ==
The show features 16 choirs of up to 40 members participating in the competition, with 4 choirs competing per episode for the initial Round of 16. Each of those choirs has a Top Tune and a Battle Tune which they have prepared before the competition, and part of a Surprise Medley which is revealed to them on the day.

During the show, each of the choirs presents their Top Tune to the judges, and then the Surprise Medley occurs, in which all of the choirs sing part (45 seconds) of a medley. The judges then deliberate, and send one group to the next stage of the competition, and immediately eliminate another group. After that, the two choirs remaining are left to sing their Battle Tunes, one straight after the other, and the judges decide who gets promoted to the next leg of the competition and who gets eliminated.

The stages of the competition are (in order): Round of 16 (16 choirs, 4 episodes), Quarter finals (8 choirs, 2 episodes), semi final (4 choirs, 1 episode), grand final (3 choirs, 1 episode).

== Final results ==
The winner of was the University of Newcastle Chamber Choir. Melbourne community choir Vox Synergy battled the University of Newcastle Chamber Choir for the top prize. Vox Synergy sang of the Sarah McLachlan song "Angel, while the University of Newcastle Chamber Choir won with their arrangement of Queen's "Bicycle Race", and Sting's 'Straight to My Heart'.

Third finalist Harambee was eliminated after the Surprise Medley.

== Reception ==
=== Viewership ===
| Episode | | Original airdate | Viewers (millions) | Nightly Rank | Source |
|---|---|---|---|---|---|
| 1 | "Episode 1" | 15 June 2008 | 1.445 | #5 | |
| 2 | "Episode 2" | 22 June 2008 | 1.344 | #6 | |
| 3 | "Episode 3" | 29 June 2008 | 1.021 | #10 | |
| 4 | "Episode 4" | 6 July 2008 | 1.159 | #8 | |
| 5 | "Episode 5" | 13 July 2008 | 1.241 | #6 | |
| 6 | "Episode 6" | 20 July 2008 | 1.352 | #6 | |
| 7 | "Episode 7" | 27 July 2008 | 1.322 | #6 | |
| 8 | "Grand Final" | 3 August 2008 | 1.377 | #4 | |

== See also ==
- List of Australian television series
- Last Choir Standing
