= Cruise Mode =

- Genre: motoring magazine
- Created by: Cameron Jurd
- Based on: An original format by Oxygen360
- Creative director: Cameron Jurd
- Presented by: Shannon Noll; Charli Robinson
- Country of origin: Australia
- Original language: English
- No. of seasons: 2
- No. of episodes: 16

Production
- Production location: Various Australian Locations
- Running time: 22 minutes
- Production company: Oxygen360

Original release
- Network: Network Ten
- Release: 23 July 2016 – 17 September 2017

Cruise Mode is an Australian motoring magazine television series which screened on Network Ten from 23 July 2016 at 3 p.m. Saturdays. It is hosted by Shannon Noll and Charli Robinson and is about special cars, special places and special road trips.
