= Dennis Hoggart =

Scottish footballer

Personal information
- Full name: Dennis Joseph Hoggart
- Date of birth: 2 January 1939 (age 87)
- Place of birth: Glasgow, Scotland
- Position: Forward

Youth career
- Ferndale Athletic

Senior career*
Years	Team	Apps	(Gls)
1957–1960	Leeds United	0	(0)
1960–1964	York City	45	(11)
1964–1966	Stockport County	30	(6)
- Sydney Prague
- * Club domestic league appearances and goals

Dennis Joseph Hoggart (born 2 January 1939 in Glasgow, Scotland) is a Scottish former professional footballer.

After spending three years with Leeds United, Hoggart played for York City and Stockport County in the Football League Fourth Division. He later played for Australian team Sydney Prague.

== Personal life ==
Hoggart and his wife, Sonjie, currently live in Sydney, as their youngest daughter, Kellie (born 1 May 1974), currently lives in Melbourne. She was formerly a member of the Teen Queens, an Australian pop group from 1992 to 1993 and an original member of Hi-5, an Australian children's music group aligned with a TV series of the same name from 1998 to 2008. His oldest daughter, Kyllé (born 22 May) currently resides in Los Angeles. Kyllé played the role of Roberta 'Robbie' Henderson in The Ferals, an Australian children's television series from 1994 to 1995.
