= Stupid, Stupid Man =

- Cast of Stupid, Stupid Man.
- Created by: Mark C Burnett; Selena Crowley; William Usic
- Starring: Wayne Hope; Matthew Newton; Bob Franklin; Sophie Katinis; Chris Leaney; Leah Vandenberg
- Country of origin: Australia
- No. of seasons: 2
- No. of episodes: 16

Production
- Running time: 22 minutes (excluding commercials)
- Production company: Jigsaw Entertainment

Original release
- Network: TV1
- Release: 14 November 2006 – 29 January 2008

Stupid, Stupid Man is an Australian television comedy which originally aired on TV1. It is set in the office of the fictional men's magazine COQ (Chap's Own Quarterly), parodying such men's magazines as FHM and Ralph. The first season began broadcasting on 14 November 2006, and a second season began on 11 December 2007. On 29 January 2008, the final episode of the show aired.

== Plot ==
Stupid, Stupid Man centres on the lives of the four men on the editorial team and the women who work with them. Carl Van Dyke (Wayne Hope) is the editor whose roots and aspirations lie with real news journalism. Nick Driscoll (Matthew Newton) is the features writer who is smart and very charming but lazy. Dave Muir (Bob Franklin) is the self-doubting advice columnist. Tina Carmody (Sophie Katinis) is the smart and sexy personal assistant, who understands the paradoxical world of men's magazines, and is an astute judge of character with a disarming ability to speak her mind. Ross Hampton (Chris Leaney) is the shy, aspirational copy boy, who still lives with his mum. Anne Cassidy (Leah Vandenberg) is the stylish and successful publisher who knows more about men she works with than they know about themselves.

== Cast ==
=== Main ===
- Wayne Hope as Carl Van Dyke
- Matthew Newton as Nick Driscoll
- Bob Franklin as Dave Muir
- Sophie Katinis as Tina Carmody
- Chris Leaney as Ross Hampton
- Leah Vandenberg as Anne Cassidy

=== Guest cast (Season 1, 2006) ===
- Georgie Parker as Dr. McPherson / Uta
- Tasma Walton as Janine Russell
- Barry Otto as Principal Cooper
- Sarah Chalmers as Ademia
- Natalie Bassingthwaighte as Sandy Clarke
- Kristian Schmid as Adam Lilycrap
- Felix Williamson as Garry
- Richard Carter as FA / JA
- Kate Bell as Melinda
- Kieran Darcy-Smith as Jack Hanson
- Damon Herriman as Pippy
- Camilla Ah Kin as Sandra
- Josh Clabburn as Ben Van Dyke
- Leo Sayer as Himself
- Greg Matthews as Himself
- Anne Fulwood as Self/Newsreader
- Barry Otto as Principal Cooper

=== Guest cast (Season 2, 2007-08) ===
- Stephen Curry as Chris
- Marcus Graham as James
- Jacqueline McKenzie as Jane
- Richard Carter as FA / JA
- Terry Serio as John Hunt
- Leo Sayer as Himself
- Maria Venuti as Margaret
- Emily Taheny as Shona
- Nicholas Zefaris as Tony Munniti
- Jordan Raskopoulos as Clown Boy
- Helen Thomson as Carol Van Dyke
- Deborah Mailman as Lenore Schutzstaffel
- Tory Mussett as Leanne
- Fayssal Bazzi as Daniel
- Cariba Heine as Mindy
- Camilla Ah Kin as Sandra
- Zoe Tuckwell-Smith as Gwen
- Josh Clabburn as Ben Van Dyke
- Courtney-Jane Polder as Rachel Van Dyke
- Christopher Parson as Nigel
- Maria Venuti as Margaret

== Episode guide ==
=== Season 1 (2006) ===
- Episode 1: "Prophylaxis" (14 November 2006)
- Episode 2: "A Very Very Private Function" (14 November 2006)
- Episode 3: "The Reunion" (21 November 2006)
- Episode 4: "The Cobra" (21 November 2006)
- Episode 5: "The Guest" (28 November 2006)
- Episode 6: "Integrity" (28 November 2006)
- Episode 7: "The Mole" (5 December 2006)
- Episode 8: "Full Circle" (5 December 2006)

=== Season 2 (2007–08) ===
- Episode 1: "Appearances are Everything" (11 December 2007)
- Episode 2: "The Boyfriend" (18 December 2007)
- Episode 3: "The Black Dog" (25 December 2007)
- Episode 4: "Morale" (1 January 2008)
- Episode 5: "The Return" (8 January 2008)
- Episode 6: "Fifteenth Floor" (15 January 2008)
- Episode 7: "Coqtober" (22 January 2008)
- Episode 8: "London Calling" (29 January 2008)

== See also ==
- List of Australian television series
