= Kyllé Hoggart =

Australian actress

- Born: Kyllé Hoggart; 22 May; Sydney, New South Wales, Australia
- Occupation: Actress
- Years active: 1993–2008
- Parent: Dennis Hoggart (father)
- Relatives: Kellie Crawford (sister)

Kyllé Hoggart (born 22 May) (credited as Kylle Hogart) is an Australian actress.

== Personal life ==
Hoggart was born in Sydney on 22 May and is the older of two daughters; her younger sister, Kellie (born 1 May 1974), was formerly a member of the Teen Queens, an Australian pop group from 1992 to 1993 and an original member of Hi-5, an Australian children's music group aligned with a TV series of the same name from 1998 to 2008 and currently lives in Melbourne.

Her parents, Dennis, a former professional football player (born 2 January 1939 in Glasgow, Scotland), and Sonjie also live in Sydney.

Hoggart currently resides in Los Angeles.

== Career ==
Hoggart has appeared in more than forty television commercials, both national and international. Hoggart has also co-starred in two Australian television series, The Ferals (1994–95) as Roberta 'Robbie' Henderson and Us and Them (1995) as Donna. Hoggart also co-produced and played a waitress in the film Jesus, Mary and Joey (2003).

In 2008, Hoggart co-hosted US radio girl talk show Females Uncut.

== Filmography ==
=== Film ===
Year	Title	Role	Notes
2003	Jesus, Mary and Joey	Waitress	Co-producer

=== Television ===
Year	Title	Role	Notes
1993, 1996	G.P.	Elizabeth Preston	Season 5, Episode 24 ("Close To Her Chest")
1993, 1996	G.P.	Tina Miller	Season 8, Episode 9 ("Ding Dong Bell")
1994=95	The Ferals	Roberta 'Robbie' Henderson	TV series
1995	Us and Them	Donna	TV series
