= List of The Ferals episodes =

The Ferals is an Australian children's comedy television series which screened on the ABC from 1994 to 1995. It was created by Wendy Gray and Claire Henderson and featured a mixture of people and animal puppets known as the "Ferals." Garth Frost was responsible for the puppet design.

== The Ferals ==
=== Series overview ===
Series	Episodes	Originally released	
Series	Episodes	First released	Last released
1	15	11 April 1994	18 July 1994
2	15	20 March 1995	26 June 1995

==== Series 1 (1994) ====
No. in series	Title	Original release date
1	"A Explosion of Talent"	11 April 1994
New odious Landlord Joe King moves in and now owns the Ferals's shed so they have to try to get in his good books so he will not throw them out.
2	"The Ghost of Ironbark Lill"	18 April 1994
An urban legend of a local ghost named "Ironbark Lill" may not be just a legend after all. Well not if Joe or the Ferals have anything to do with it.
3	"Couch Potatoes"	25 April 1994
The Ferals want a new television, but Joe will not give it to them, so they decide to have their own game show of "Pay The Price" where the stakes are that Joe gets the television if he loses but if he wins, the Ferals move out of the shed.
4	"Buried Treasure"	2 May 1994
As Joe tries to sell his house, the Ferals find what they believe to be treasure, but when Mixy is sent out to bury them for safety, she learns that they are chocolate just before a knock on her head gives her amnesia.
5	"Wags to Riches"	9 May 1994
The characters all compete against each other to raise money for charity to win a week-long cruise, while also dealing with Derryn's flea outbreak.
6	"Happy Birthday!"	16 May 1994
Joe makes the Ferals do chores to earn their keep for staying in the shed. Leonard's birthday is coming and Robbie decides to use Joe's house for a party while he is out.
7	"Fifteen Seconds of Fame"	23 May 1994
The gang are trying to be noticed with their talents on television, Leonard and Robbie with their magic act and The Ferals with Modigliana's Country Western singing.
8	"Rock Horror"	30 May 1994
A living pet rock causes trouble for the Ferals.
9	"Modigliana"	6 June 1994
An X-ray shows Modigliana to have brain damage, but the gang later find out what has really been going on.
10	"Exam Fever"	13 June 1994
Dopey Derryn becomes intelligent after being hypnotized by Leonard, much to everyone's amazement.
11	"Double Trouble"	20 June 1994
Rattus and Joe's 'get-rich-quick' scheme, a Digital Duplicator goes awfully wrong when it creates a clone of Rattus. Luckily, the device has a reverse mode.
12	"The Rat in the Moon"	27 June 1994
Things go haywire when the Ferals think aliens have invaded, while Joe becomes fixated on trying to win a permanent position as publicity manager for a pizza delivery place.
13	"True Romance"	4 July 1994
It is Valentine's Day which is supposed to be a day of love, but turns into a day of frenzy with the Ferals involved, ranging from Robbie having a mystery date to Rattus becoming convinced that he is in love with Modigliana.
14	"April Fools"	11 July 1994
It is April Fools' Day and everyone is suspicious of each other's practical jokes. But Rattus has an even bigger joke planned for them.
15	"Seasons Greedings"	18 July 1994
It is Christmas and the Ferals are anxious to get their presents. Meanwhile, Joe has made up a very special Christmas dinner that does not turn out to be as happy as he thought.

==== Series 2 (1995) ====
No. in series	Title	Original release date
1	"The Dentist"	20 March 1995
Rattus is entering a cheese-eating competition, but when he suffers from toothache, the Ferals must resort to various measures - culminating in having Mixy posing as Rattus - to keep the competition going due to Rattus's fear of the dentist.
2	"Man's Best Friend"	27 March 1995
The health inspector pays a surprise visit. Which can only means one thing - he has come to discover if any Feral animals are currently living on the property, which means trouble for Derryn.
3	"A Change is a Good as a Holiday"	3 April 1995
Part 1: Robbie goes away on a holiday. Wanting to have her flat to themselves for the Winter, the Ferals decide to trick Leonard into going away as well. The problem is - once they are gone - they totally trash the place.
4	"Home Truths"	10 April 1995
Part 2: Robbie and Leonard lock up the Ferals's shed until they can pay to rebuild the damage caused to their flat.
5	"Rent A Pet"	17 April 1995
When Rattus borrows money from Joe in all the Ferals's names, they are all deep in debt and have to do several jobs to get the money back. Meanwhile, Leonard creates a special robot and Joe sees this as another get rich quick scheme.
6	"Let's Get Physical"	24 April 1995
Joe applies for a job as a gym instructor in America so the Ferals, Robbie and Leonard help out in return for a reward of $500. But things get out of hand, especially when Leonard invents a Digital Anti Gravity device.
7	"School's Out"	1 May 1995
The Ferals must pass an exam or else be sent to school. Luckily, Robbie and Leonard are on hand to help them out.
8	"Rich and Infamous"	8 May 1995
Joe has won the lottery of a million dollars, so the Ferals, Robbie and Leonard use this to their advantage to buy stuff in his name, until they find out what he has really won and destroy Joe's new car.
9	"Feral TV"	15 May 1995
The Ferals decide to cheat to get on television.
10	"Mixy Mania"	22 May 1995
Robbie has entered 'Totally Cool's' talent competition. But so has Mixy — and she has taped over Robbie's entry. When Mixy ends up winning the competition, the promise of stardom goes to her head, and sets feral against feral in the battle for the spotlight.
11	"Ratty Ratty Bang Bang!"	29 May 1995
Joe has a part time job in a food warehouse — and he is bringing home the goodies. When it is discovered that a coin-sized terrorist bomb has been planted somewhere in the food, there is mayhem because Rattus is ticking.
12	"Four Ferals and a Wedding"	5 June 1995
Joe falls in love, but his relationship is complicated by his attempts to keep the Ferals away from the bride.
13	"Prime Suspect"	12 June 1995
After watching some strange goings on at Robbie and Leonard's flat, Mixy thinks that Robbie is a murderer.
14	"Joe's Army"	19 June 1995
To get back at the Ferals for stealing a turn in their car, Keith and Kylie take over their favourite rubbish tip. The Ferals turn to Joe (who is currently an army cadet in training) for help, but things get worse when he switches sides, Mixy is kidnapped and Kylie steals Leonard's new invention: S.N.I.F.F. (The Solar Neutronic Integrated Force Field).
15	"Fossil Fools"	26 June 1995
When Derryn finds a dinosaur bone buried near the shed, the Ferals decide to open a dinosaur theme park with Joe as their partner. But Joe gets greedy and is determined to find more bones even if it means destroying their home and Robbie and Leonard's flat in the process. This is the final episode of the series and programme.

== Feral TV ==
=== Series overview ===
Season	Episodes	Originally released	
Season	Episodes	First released	Last released
1	30	1996	1996
2	15	1997	1997

==== Series 1 (1996) ====
No. in series	Title	Original release date
1	"Feral Peril"	3 April 1996
2	TBA	TBA
3	"The Cane Toad Cometh"	TBA
4	TBA	TBA
5	"Mighty Dorky Power Whingers"	TBA
6	"Feral Match"	TBA
7	"Doctor Franken Burger"	TBA
8	"Bewdey Bottler Bush Show"	TBA
9	"Furry Tales"	TBA
10	TBA	TBA
11	TBA	TBA
12	"Get Lost"	TBA
13	"The Anthill Mob"	TBA
14	TBA	TBA
15	"Dodgy Ads"	TBA
16	"The Toad Prince"	TBA
17	TBA	TBA
18	TBA	TBA
19	"BB Or Not BB"	TBA
20	"Eggs With Legs"	TBA
21	"The Tadpole Connection"	TBA
22	"Young Roaches"	TBA
23	"Play Mixy For Me"	TBA
24	"The Easter Bunny"	TBA
25	"No Talent Time"	TBA
26	"The Siege"	TBA
27	"Flying Ferals"	TBA
28	"Good Sports"	TBA
29	"Warts And All"	TBA
30	"Club Feral"	TBA

==== Series 2 (1997) ====
No. in series	Title	Original release date
1	"The New Office"	TBA
2	"Feral Minds"	TBA
3	"The Door"	TBA
4	"Super Dog"	TBA
5	"To Mixy With Love"	TBA
6	"Badiators"	TBA
7	"It's My Party"	TBA
8	"Sing For Me"	TBA
9	"Who Killed Cock Robin?"	TBA
10	"The Big Sleep"	TBA
11	"Hair Today"	TBA
12	"Eat Cold Porridge Cyber Droid"	TBA
13	"Mr. Doggyverse"	TBA
14	"Itchy"	TBA
15	"Bush Tucker"	TBA
