= Alf Huggett =

Australian rules footballer

Personal information
- Full name: Alf Huggett
- Born: 24 October 1892
- Died: 9 October 1972 (aged 79)
- Original team: Golden Point

Playing career^{1}
Years	Club	Games (Goals)
1916	Carlton	1 (1)
- ^{1} Playing statistics correct to the end of 1916.

Alf Huggett (24 October 1892 – 9 October 1972) was an Australian rules footballer who played for the Carlton Football Club in the Victorian Football League (VFL).
