= Hogsett =

Hogsett is a surname. Notable people with the surname include:

- Bob Hogsett (1941–1984), American basketball player
- Elon Hogsett (1903–2001), American baseball player
- George James Hogsett (1820–1869), Canadian lawyer and politician
- Joe Hogsett (born 1956), American politician
- Robert Hogsett (c. 1892–1953), American football player
- Scott Hogsett (born 1972), American wheelchair rugby player

== See also ==
- Hogsett, West Virginia, an unincorporated community
