= Reg Haggett =

New Zealand footballer

Personal information
- Full name: Reginald F Haggett
- Place of birth: New Zealand

Senior career*
Years	Team	Apps	(Gls)
- Ponsonby

International career
1936	New Zealand	1	(1)
- * Club domestic league appearances and goals

Reginald Haggett is a former association football player who represented New Zealand at international level.

Haggett made a single appearance in an official international for the All Whites, scoring New Zealand's goal in a 1–4 loss to Australia on 18 July 1936.
