= Arthur Huggett =

English cricketer

Personal information
- Full name: Arthur Huggett
- Born: 14 January 1861; Godstone, Surrey, England
- Died: 14 April 1945 (aged 84); High Brooms, Kent, England
- Batting: Unknown
- Bowling: Unknown

Domestic team information
- Years: Team
- 1883–1885: Sussex

Career statistics
| Competition | First-class |
|---|---|
| Matches | 3 |
| Runs scored | 14 |
| Batting average | 3.50 |
| 100s/50s | –/– |
| Top score | 5* |
| Balls bowled | 24 |
| Wickets | – |
| Bowling average | – |
| 5 wickets in innings | – |
| 10 wickets in match | – |
| Best bowling | – |
| Catches/stumpings | 1/– |
- Source: Cricinfo, 20 June 2012

Arthur Huggett (14 January 1861 – 14 April 1945) was an English cricketer. Huggett's batting and bowling styles are unknown. He was born at Godstone, Surrey.

Huggett made three first-class appearances for Sussex. He made two appearances in 1883 against Hampshire at Day's Antelope Ground, Southampton, and Yorkshire at Bramall Lane, Sheffield. His third first-class appearance came in 1885 against Gloucestershire at the County Ground, Hove. In his three first-class matches, he scored a total of 14 runs at an average of 3.50, with a high score of 5 not out.

He died at High Brooms, Kent, on 14 April 1945.
