= The Ferals =

Australian children's comedy TV series

- The Ferals' cast
- Also known as: Ferals
- Genre: Children's television
- Created by: Wendy Gray; Claire Henderson
- Starring: Miguel Ayesa; Danielle Baker (series 2); David Collins; Mal Heap; Emma deVries; Kylle Hogart; Brian Rooney; Terry Ryan; Kelly Wallwork (series 1)
- Voices of: Danielle Baker as Kylie (series 2); David Collins as Rattus P. Rattus; Mal Heap as Modigliana Wydebottom/Keith; Emma deVries as Mixy M. Toasus; Terry Ryan as Derryn; Kelly Wallwork as Kylie (series 1)
- Composer: Peter Dasent
- Country of origin: Australia
- Original language: English
- No. of series: 2
- No. of episodes: 30

Production
- Running time: 25 minutes

Original release
- Network: ABC TV
- Release: 11 April 1994 – 26 June 1995

The Ferals is an Australian children's comedy television series which aired on ABC from 1994 to 1995. It was created by Wendy Gray and Claire Henderson and featured a mixture of people and animal puppets known as the "Ferals". Garth Frost was responsible for the puppet design. The opening theme was written by Peter Dasent and Arthur Baysting and performed by Dave Dobbyn. In the UK, the show aired on satellite television via Nickelodeon UK.

== Plot ==
The Ferals are an eclectic group of animals that live together in a backyard shed. There is a rat called Rattus, a feral cat called Modigliana, a rabbit called Mixy, and a feral dog called Derryn. The humans are two university students, and their landlord, who clash with each other and the Ferals.

They include the uptight, neurotic landlord Joe King who is determined to remove the ferals from his garden; the affable science student Leonard, and medical student Robbie, who attempt to shield the ferals from eviction, but are sometimes exasperated with their antics.

There were also the 'Bozos From The Bush' as Modigliana liked to call them, Keith, a koala and Kylie, a kangaroo. These two characters often clashed with the Ferals, thinking they were above them due to their status as native Australian animals.

They were also quite nasal and whiny in their characteristics. Other characters included White Ants (Tina Bursill, Robert Hughes), Rock Wrangler (Tina Matthews) and Fat Cat (Taylor Owynns)

== Characters ==
=== Puppets ===
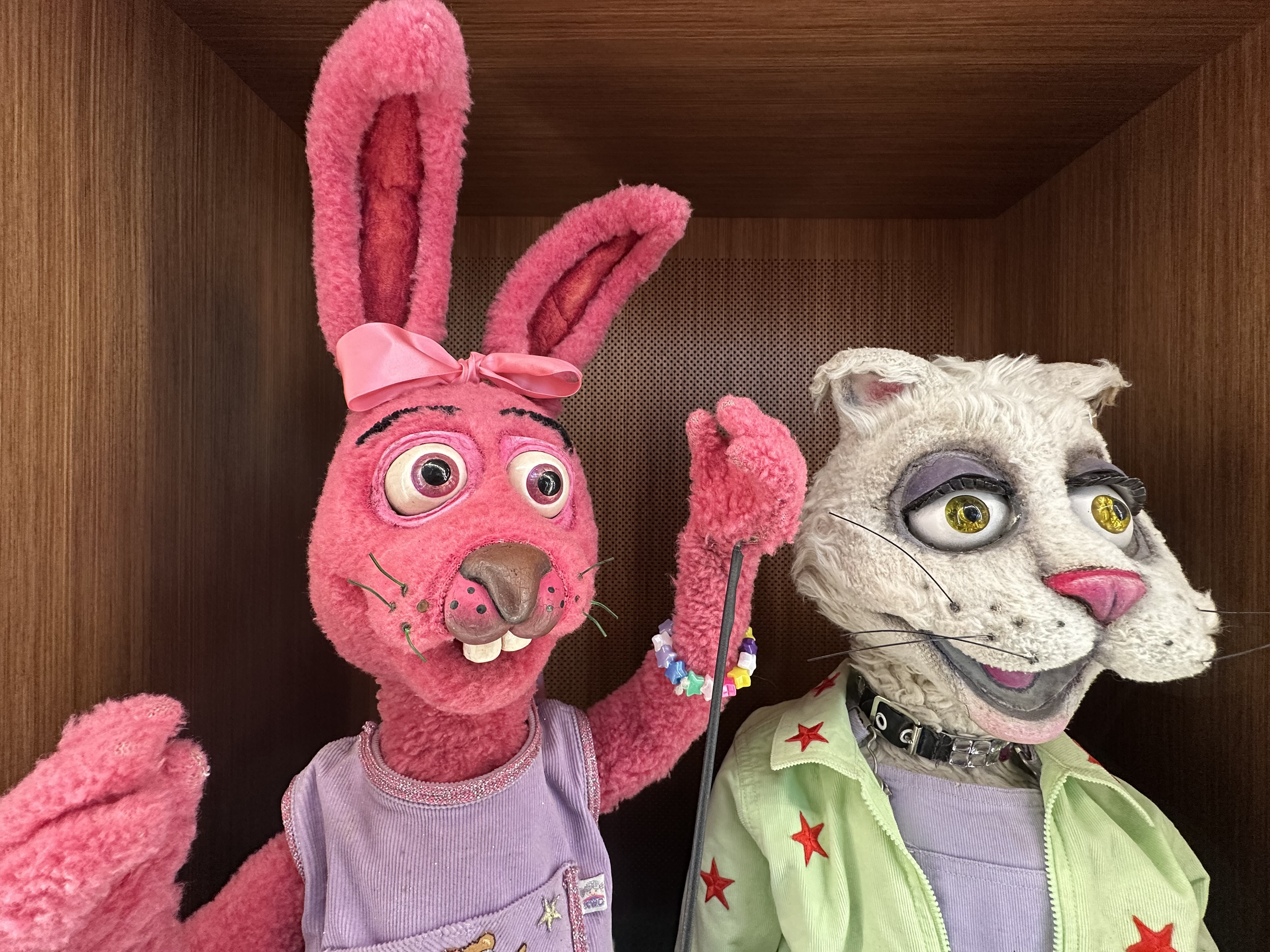
Puppets of the Mixy and Modigliana characters on display at the Australian Centre for the Moving Image in 2026

- Rattus P. Rattus (He's the leader of the bunch) Puppeteer – David Collins: The leather-jacket wearing leader of the ferals, Rattus is a black rat with a mischievous sense of humour and a love of foul odours. He enjoys taunting the cat Modigliana ("fur ball"), but is often thumped in return. He is obsessed with procuring a car of his own, often concocting several outlandish schemes to acquire one and jumping at any opportunity that will provide even the slightest chance of getting one. Rattus rattus is the scientific name for the common black rat.
- Modigliana Esmerelda Olga Wydebottom (She's fluffy, but she's tough) Puppeteer – Mal Heap: A preening cat, Modigliana is also self-confident, tough and forceful, frequently clashing with Rattus as the only other particularly intelligent animal. She has parallels with the Muppets character Miss Piggy, albeit with more mangey and violent characterisation.
- Derryn (A Dopey Dog) Puppeteer – Terry Ryan: Derryn is a dog who is not the brightest of the bunch and has a habit of forgetting where he buried his bone, but does occasionally show flashes of brilliance, such as when he won a contest to win money for charity by training his fleas.
- Mixy M. Toasus (A Muddled up, mixed up Bunny) Puppeteer – Emma deVries: Mixy is a sweet, cute carrot-loving pink rabbit, but can sometimes be neurotic, and is generally only slightly smarter than Derryn. In line with the subversive black humour of the show, Mixy is named after the myxomatosis disease, introduced to Australia to reduce the population of feral rabbits.
- Keith Puppeteer – Mal Heap: Keith is a koala, who loves eating gum leaves, sleeping, and playing his mum's old harmonica.
- Kylie Puppeteer – Kelly Wallwork (Series 1), Danielle Baker (Series 2): Kylie is a kangaroo, who often has to help Keith out of trouble. She also fights frequently with Modigliana. Her later whereabouts are unclear since she doesn't appear in Feral TV.

=== Humans ===
- Joseph Wayne "Joe" King (played by Miguel Ayesa): The Ferals' conceited, self-centered landlord who is forever trying to evict the Ferals from the shed. He is also often trying to get high-flying jobs, ranging from head of publicity at a pizza delivery place or acting as a guard at a cake factory. This attitude eventually works against him in the final episode in the series when his attempts to open a dinosaur-themed park after Derryn discovered a dinosaur bone which drove him to destroy the shed and Robbie and Leonard's flat trying to find more bones, prompting the others to destroy his house and leave him lying under the original bone. It is unclear if he was rescued from underneath the bone after the events of the show.
- Leonard (played by Brian Rooney): Nicknamed Lenny by most of the characters. Leonard is a science student who is always coming up with inventions, which rarely work. He has also demonstrated other skills, such as demonstrating magic tricks and hypnotizing Derryn to be smart by accident. In the finale after the destruction of his flat, he mentions that he is going to the Antarctic for a few months to gather samples as part of a science expedition.
- Roberta "Robbie" Henderson (played by Kylle Hogart): Robbie is a medical student, who loves playing the guitar, and dreams of travelling the world with a rock band. She is generally portrayed as the most tolerant of the Ferals of the three humans, often acting as their 'doctor' when they are hurt, such as when Mixy had amnesia. In the finale, she mentions that she is moving in with a new band following the destruction of her original flat.

== Episodes ==
Series	Episodes	Originally released	
Series	Episodes	First released	Last released
1	15	11 April 1994	18 July 1994
2	15	20 March 1995	26 June 1995

Season	Episodes	Originally released	
Season	Episodes	First released	Last released
1	30	1996	1996
2	15	1997	1997

== Feral TV ==
Later in 1996 a five-minute show called Feral TV was launched. The Ferals had been exploring the sewers, due to Joe demolishing the shed in the final episode, and had discovered the cable to a TV station. They started their own TV channel, calling it Feral TV, running under the TV boss Kerry, a loud gruff toad with an explosive temper, and his obsequious assistant the cockroach Rodney. Kerry's character is modelled on the Australian media magnate Kerry Packer, who at the time, was the owner of Channel Nine (despite the show airing on ABC). Keith from the original show also returned for this show as well as a character from The Ferals' pilot episode called Berry the Bat. Kylie was the only one of the original six main puppet characters not to return since having two puppeteers (Kelly Wallwork and Danielle Baker) didn't make her a strong character to work with. The show ran for 55 episodes. From July to August 2023, Modigliana and Keith's actor, Mal Heap uploaded a long lost second series of the show on his YouTube account, That Puppet Bloke. The series was also shown on the same UK network as the previous series (Nickelodeon UK).

== After The Ferals ==
Although few of the human actors went on to achieve successful television careers, some of the puppet characters continue to feature regularly in ABC programming. Mixy, in particular, was used as a host introducing the shows on the ABC Kids programming block, also named Mixy, as well as having her own show and website. In the early 2000s, Mixy's website was shown at the ABC Playground Website in-between shows behind painted blobs. After the programming block finished in July 2002, Mixy, puppeteered by Emma DeVries, kept appearing in ABC idents and her own website episodes until around the mid-2000s.

Rattus and Modigliana were featured in the ABC School's education maths program, Numbers Count (Mixy and Derryn were mentioned in one scene). Also Modigliana went on to feature as co-host of the show Creature Features while Rattus went on to feature as co-host of the show Literature Classics. Derryn is the only one of the quartet not to appear in ABC's other programmes. Rattus, Modigliana and Mixy appeared in the 2022 edition of ABC New Year's Eve Early Night Show.

In 2000, the puppeteer Mal Heap, who played Modigliana the cat and Keith the koala from The Ferals, introduced the role of Joe the Kangaroo alongside Mixy.

== Ferals Funtastic Fanbook ==
1996 saw the publication of The Ferals Funtastic Fanbook by Garth Frost, Wendy Gray, David Witt and Tina Matthews.

== The Ferals Podcast ==
The Ferals Podcast logo

On 17 May 2015 the first episode of an unofficial podcast simply titled The Ferals Podcast was released. On 10 January 2016 they posted their last episode.

In the podcast, hosts Monkey Boy Swinny and Mike took an in-depth look at the cult-classic children's television series.

== See also ==
- List of Australian television series
