= Teen Queens =

Australian pop music girl group

- Origin: Sydney, New South Wales, Australia
- Genre: Pop
- Years active: 1991–1993
- Label: Westside/Phonogram
- Members: Roxanne Clarke; Kellie Crawford; Liza Witt

Teen Queens were an Australian pop music girl group, formed in 1991 by three model-singer-actresses: Roxanne Clarke, Kellie Crawford and Liza Witt. In 1992 and 1993, they scored four hit singles on the ARIA Charts with cover versions of "Be My Baby" (No. 6, May 1992), "I Can't Help Myself" (No. 28, July 1992), "Love How You Love Me" (No. 14, September 1992) and "Baby It's You" (No. 91, April 1993). The group's debut album, Get Happy!, was released in November 1992, which peaked at No. 36. The group disbanded in 1993. Their singles "I Can't Help Myself" and "Love How You Love Me" were nominated for Engineer of the Year at the 1993 ARIA Awards.

== Background ==
The Teen Queens were formed in Sydney in 1991 by three model-singer-actresses: Roxanne Clarke, Kellie Crawford (née Hoggart) and Liza Witt. A pilot episode was developed by the creators of E Street, a teen TV soap opera, for a self-titled half-hour TV program about a girl group set in 1960s. According to The Canberra Times correspondent the show "follows three girls from the country who head to the city to make it big in the music world. Naturally all doesn't go according to plan."

By the time that the pilot was turned down, the trio had made the group a reality as a dance-pop act. In May 1992 their cover version of the Ronettes' "Be My Baby" became a No. 6 hit on the ARIA Singles Chart. Their debut album, Get Happy!, was released on Westside Records/Phonogram in November 1992 and reached No. 36 on the ARIA Albums Chart. It included "some classic songs from the '60s." Bevan Hannan of The Canberra Times rated the album at 3 out of 10, he felt that it was "Manufactured pop... for aspiring musicians (?) like the Teen Queens, who supposedly have the world at their feet, why would you choose to play the type of material that clapped out rockers use on the RSL club circuit? Get Happy! is a bit like that... it would probably be better to tune in to 2CA, or better still purchase one of the '60s rock box collections. The originals blow away this regurgitated stuff."

The group also provided the vocals for a Coca-Cola TV ad. In July 1992, the Teen Queens appeared on E Street as contestants on a fictitious, in-show dating game, Dream Date. They had further top 40 singles including The Four Tops' "I Can't Help Myself" (No. 28) in July 1992 and The Paris Sisters' "Love How You Love Me" (No. 14) in September 1992. The latter track featured on an episode of E Street for the wedding theme for the characters of Toni and CJ. A final single, a cover version of The Shirelles' "Baby It's You" was released in April 1993, which peaked at No. 91. In June that year they performed the track on TV's Midday show, with backing by the station's Geoff Harvey band. A second album, Get Happy! II, was released in July 1993 before the group disbanded.

== After Teen Queens ==
After the Teen Queens split in 1993, each member pursued solo projects.

Crawford became a founding member of the children's music group, Hi-5, from September 1998 to December 2008: she appeared on the TV series of the same name.

Witt appeared on TV shows, Good Morning Australia and Mornings with Kerrie-Anne and, as from 2006, she hosted a TV online-shopping site.

Clarke and her brother PJ Clarke devised the performing arts agency 'Detour' out of Brent Street Studios in Sydney from 1998 to 2003. As agents they launched many performers and creatives into successful careers within the industry and produced entertainment at events. Clarke currently works with her brother PJ at Jeep Management Pty Ltd in Sydney, Australia.

== Members ==
- Roxanne Clarke
- Kellie Crawford
- Liza Witt

== Discography ==
=== Studio albums ===
List of studio albums, with selected details and chart positions
Title	Album details	Peak chart positions
Title	Album details	AUS
Get Happy!	Released: November 1992; Label: Westside/Phonogram (512 993–4); Format: CD, cassette	36
Get Happy! II	Released: July 1993; Label: Westside/Phonogram; Format: CD, cassette	—
"—" denotes releases that did not chart or were not released in that country.

=== Singles ===
List of singles, with selected chart positions
Title	Year	Peak chart positions	Album
Title	Year	AUS	Album
"Be My Baby"	1992	6	Get Happy!
"I Can't Help Myself"	1992	28	Get Happy!
"Love How You Love Me"	1992	14	Get Happy!
"Baby It's You"	1993	91	Non-album single

== Awards and nominations ==
=== ARIA Music Awards ===
Year	Nominated works	Award	Result	Lost to	Ref
1993	"I Can't Help Myself"	Engineer of the Year	Nominated	Yothu Yindi - "Dharpa" and "Tribal Voice"	
1993	"Love How You Love Me"	Engineer of the Year	Nominated	Yothu Yindi - "Dharpa" and "Tribal Voice"	
