= Kellie Crawford =

Australian actress and singer

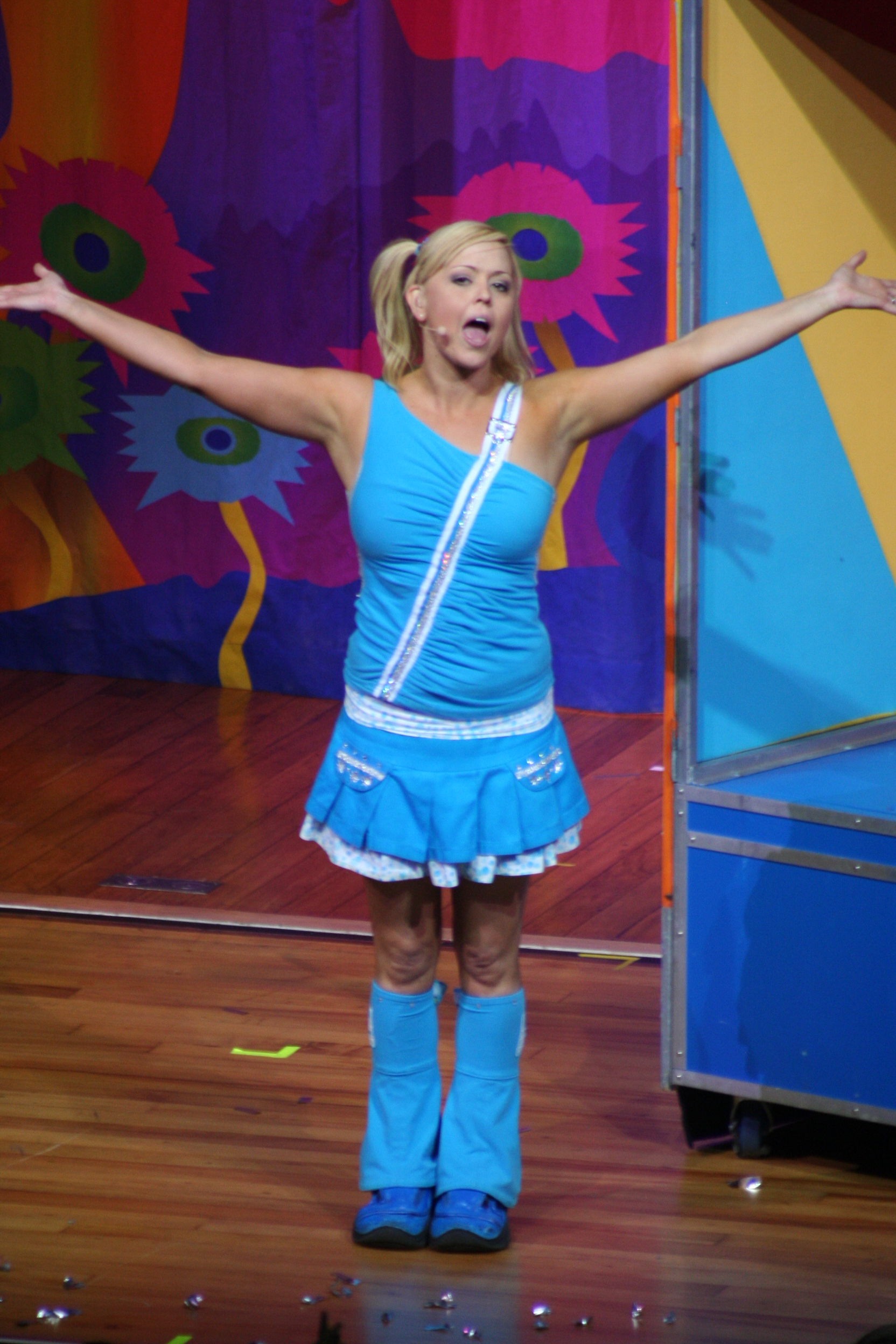
- Crawford performing in 2006
- Born: Kellie Lynn Hoggart; 1 May 1974 (age 52); Sydney, New South Wales, Australia
- Occupations: Actress, singer
- Years active: 1991–2008, 2018–present
- Spouse: Addam Crawford (m. 2008; died 2018)
- Father: Dennis Hoggart
- Relatives: Kyllé Hoggart (sister)

Kellie Lynn Crawford (née Hoggart; born 1 May 1974), is an Australian singer, actress and children's performer. Crawford was an original member of the Australian children's musical group Hi-5 from 1998 to 2008 and was also a member of pop group Teen Queens. She left Hi-5 in December 2008 after ten years with the group.

== Career ==
Crawford was born Kellie Lynn Hoggart on 1 May 1974. She began her career as a teenager appearing in Pizza Hut commercials. In 1991, at age 17, Crawford along with Liza Witt and Roxanne Clarke, formed an idea to bring back music from the past and recreate it as a pop music act. Initially, they tried to launch the project as a television idea set in the themed time of the 1960s. As the group experienced difficulties getting the television show off the ground, they diverted their attentions towards simply creating music. They decided to name the group Teen Queens, and from 1992 to 1993 the group released four ARIA charting singles.

After the group split in 1993, Crawford continued to act in television and film, and appear in commercials for companies such as Pizza Hut.

Crawford was originally cast as Tracy Russell in Australia's long-running sitcom Hey Dad..!, but was replaced by Belinda Emmett.

Crawford's next breakthrough came in 1998 when she was enlisted to join the television show Hi-5 as part of the children's group of the same name as its oldest and most commercially experienced member. She featured with a puppet named "Chatterbox", better known as "Chats", voiced originally by co-cast member Charli Robinson (later Sophie Katinis, Erin Marshall and Noni McCallum). Kellie and Chats' segment of the show, Word Play, promoted and educated children on language skills and recognition of sounds and noises.

In October 2008, she announced that she would quit Hi-5 after ten years of commitment to the group alongside Nathan Foley. She was replaced by Lauren Brant.

Following her exit from Hi-5, Crawford was featured in a racy Ralph cover story. She expressed her desire to establish herself for the older demographic. This received mixed reception but Crawford was confident that she was constantly advocating positive messages for all her target audiences.

Crawford was announced as a judge for the Seven Network's talent program All Together Now in 2018.

Since 2019, Crawford has been based in Melbourne and is a freelance voice-over artist and television actress.

In 2023, Crawford returned to her home town of Sydney to continue working as an actor represented by Williams Management and as a voice artist represented by EM Voices.

== Personal life ==
Born in Sydney, Crawford was educated at the Meriden School in Strathfield, a suburb of Sydney. She is the youngest of two daughters; her older sister, Kyllé (born 22 May), played the character of Roberta 'Robbie' Henderson in ABC TV's The Ferals. Her parents are Dennis, a former professional footballer, and Sonjie. Kellie has mild dyslexia.

Through the show, she became good friends and eventually in 2002 began dating fellow Hi-5 cast member Nathan Foley. The couple became engaged in 2005 to be married in March 2007. On 7 December 2006, it was reported that Crawford and Foley had decided to end their engagement. Apparently, their breakup had occurred some time prior to the reports.

In 2007, Kellie became engaged to Addam Crawford. They married in May 2008. Addam died in October 2018.

== Filmography ==
Television roles
Year	Title	Role	Notes
1999–2008	Hi-5	Presenter	Series 1–10
2018	All Together Now	Judge	Series 1

Film roles
Year	Title	Role
1996	Dating the Enemy	Make-up Artist
