= Hogget =

Hogget may refer to:

- A domestic sheep between one and two years of age
  - The meat from such an animal — see lamb and mutton
  - The wool of such an animal

== See also ==
- Hoggett, a surname (with list of people with this name)
