= Charli Robinson =

Australian television and radio presenter (born 1980)

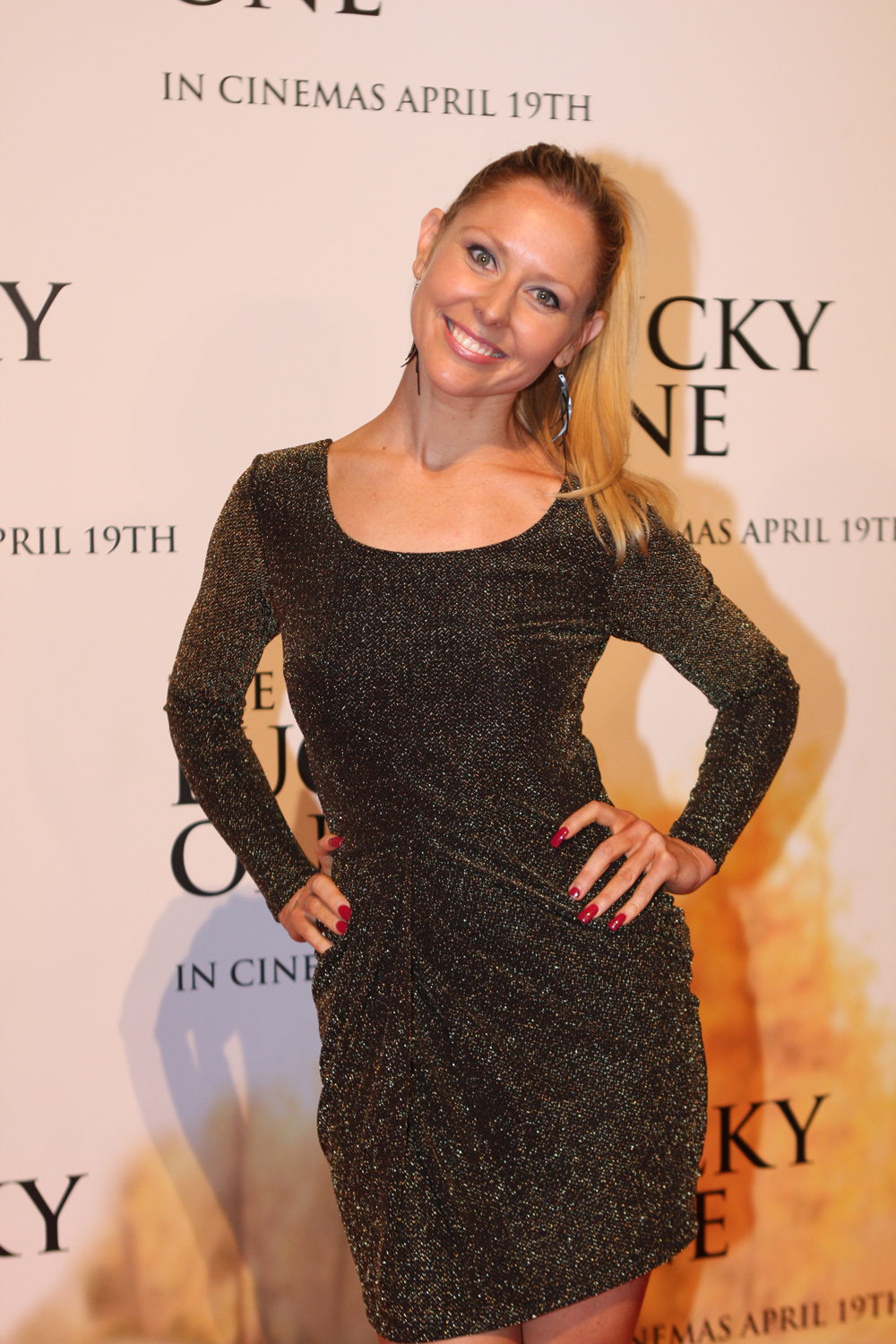
- Robinson at the premiere of The Lucky One in 2012
- Born: Sharlene Marie Zeta Robinson; 8 March 1980 (age 46); Newcastle, New South Wales, Australia
- Occupations: Television, radio personality
- Years active: 1998–present
- Spouse: Brent Delaney (m. 2003; div. 2009)
- Partner(s): Liam Talbot (2016–present)
- Children: 2

Sharlene Marie Zeta Robinson (born 8 March 1980), known professionally as Charli Robinson previously as Charli Delaney, is an Australian television and radio presenter, most famously known as an original member of children's musical group Hi-5 and the television series of the same name from 1998 to 2008 and left Hi-5 after ten years with the group. She is known now as a presenter on Nine Network travel program Getaway.

== Early life ==
Robinson was born in Newcastle, New South Wales, and she has an older sister named Cassandra. She attended Hunter School of the Performing Arts at Broadmeadow, Newcastle, before featuring in various TV shows and soap operas.

== Career ==
=== Hi-5 ===
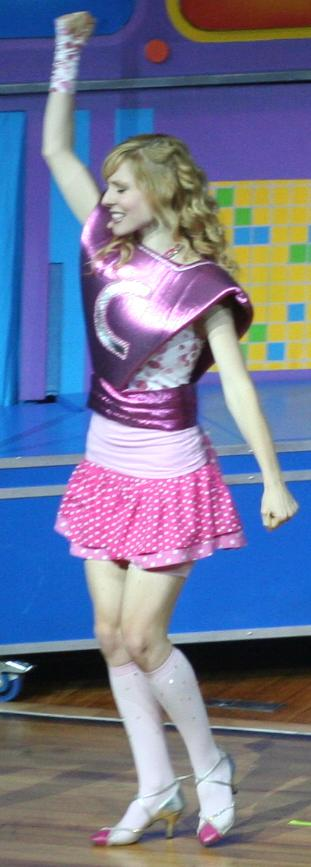
Robinson performed in 2006.

Robinson was the youngest original member of group Hi-5.

Robinson chose to leave Hi-5 in February 2008, officially announcing on 22 February 2008 that she would be leaving the group. She indicated that she would continue with the show until a suitable replacement was found. She was replaced by Casey Burgess. Robinson noted her plans for the future include other presenting work and acting in television and films, to challenge herself. She served as a judge on Battle of the Choirs in 2008, and she also appeared on the eighth season of Dancing with the Stars.

=== TV Hosting ===
In 2009, Robinson co-hosted the celebrity singing show It Takes Two with Home and Away actor Paul O'Brien and signed a three-year contract with the show. She also appeared in the short film Tegan the Vegan

In October 2011, it was announced that she would be hosting a re-launch of the TV show It's a Knockout.

=== Radio presenter ===
In 2009, Robinson had a show on the Today Network's 2Day FM and Fox FM on late nights initially [Monday to Wednesday] with Chris Page and had co-hosted the Top 6 @ 6 with Danno on the Today Network for one hour.

In May 2011, Robinson filled in as the host on The Kyle & Jackie O Show while Kyle Sandilands and Jackie Henderson were off on sick leave.

On 5 December 2011, it was announced that Robinson was signed to host the Sea FM Gold Coast breakfast show in 2012 with Simon Baggott and Paul Gale.

== Personal life ==
Robinson married her childhood partner, Brent Delaney, in 2003. The pair separated in 2009 after six years together.

In February 2016, Robinson revealed that she and her partner of five years, Justin Kirkpatrick, had separated.

In August 2018, Robinson and partner Liam Talbot announced they were expecting their first child. Their daughter was born on 27 December 2018. Robinson and Talbot became engaged at Mount Panorama on 13 October 2019, and on 20 July 2020 they had a second daughter.

== Filmography ==
Television roles
Year	Title	Role	Notes
1999–2008	Hi-5	Presenter	Series 1 to 10
2003–present	Getaway	Reporter	Regular reporter since 2014
2007	Spicks And Specks	Guest	
2008	Good News Week	Guest	
2008	Battle of the Choirs	Series Judge	
2008	Dancing with the Stars	Contestant	
2008	Carols in the Domain	Performer	Performed "Away in a Manger"
2009	The Squiz	Regular guest	
2011–14	The Dirt TV	Reporter	
2011–12	It's a Knockout	Host	
2016–17	Cruise Mode	Host	
2019	Channel Nine Queensland Children's Hospital Telethon	Host	

=== Dancing with the Stars performances ===
In late 2008, Robinson competed in the eighth season of Dancing with the Stars. Robinson's partner was Csaba Szirmai, one of the show's resident professional dancers.

Week #	Dance/Song	Judges' score			Total Score	Result
Week #	Dance/Song	Todd	Helen	Mark	Total Score	Result
1	Cha-cha-cha / "Pictures"	6	7	7	20	Safe
2	Tango / "My Love"	8	8	7	23	Safe
3	Samba / "Mas Que Nada"	7	7	8	22	Safe
4	Quickstep / "Right Now"	6	8	8	22	Bottom Two
5	Salsa / "Low"	8	9	9	26	Safe
6	West Coast Swing / "Don't Wanna Go to Bed Now"	8	8	8	24	Safe
7	Paso Doble/ "Bolero"; Rumba / "Colors of the Wind"	8; 9	8; 9	8; 9	24; 27	Safe
8	Jive/ "Yeh Yeh"; Foxtrot/ "1234"	5; 7	7; 7	6; 7	18; 21	Safe
9	Tango/ "Tango Forte"; Cha-Cha-Cha – Quickstep – Salsa Segue/ "Kiss" – "Keep Young and Beautiful" – "Groove Is in the Heart"	9; 6	9; 7	8; 7	26; 20	Eliminated
