= Hi-5 series 10 =

Hi-5
- Series 10
- Starring: Kellie Crawford; Nathan Foley; Stevie Nicholson; Sun Park; Charli Robinson
- No. of episodes: 45

Release
- Original network: Nine Network
- Original release: 7 July – 5 September 2008

Season chronology
- ← Previous; Series 9 Next → Series 11

The tenth series of the children's television series Hi-5 aired between 7 July 2008 and 5 September 2008 on the Nine Network in Australia. The series was produced by Kids Like Us for Nine with Helena Harris as executive producer.

This was the last series to be produced by Kids Like Us, and the last involving creator Helena Harris. It was also the first series to feature Stevie Nicholson, and the last to feature Sun Park and original cast members Kellie Crawford, Nathan Foley, and Charli Robinson. The series featured the 400th episode.

== Production ==
Prior to production of the tenth series of Hi-5 in 2007, cast member Tim Harding was involved in a serious motorcycle accident which left him unable to keep up with the demands of the Hi-5 live performances. Just a few days prior to this, Stevie Nicholson was hired as an understudy for the group's touring schedule, and immediately began work as a temporary replacement for Harding after the accident. In November 2007, Harding announced his permanent departure from the group after recovering from injuries. Nicholson took his place as a permanent member and joined the group for the filming of the tenth series. Creator Helena Harris stated "it's like [he] was born to this job."

The tenth series premiered on 7 July 2008, with the episodes exploring contemporary themes such as different family structures and technology. Unlike former cast member Kathleen de Leon Jones, Harding's departure was not explained on-screen. This was the final series produced by Kids Like Us and last to involve creator Helena Harris, before the program's sale to the Nine Network and Southern Star in 2008. As the transition was complete at the time of airing, the episodes were announced under the new management.

Sun Park returned for her second series, along with original cast members Kellie Crawford, Nathan Foley, and Charli Robinson. By the time of airing, Robinson had already departed from the cast, with intentions of furthering her presenting career. Crawford, Foley, and Park also departed at the end of 2008, making the tenth series the last to feature any original members of the group.

== Cast ==
=== Presenters ===
- Kellie Crawford – Word Play
- Nathan Foley – Shapes in Space
- Stevie Nicholson – Making Music
- Sun Park – Puzzles and Patterns
- Charli Robinson – Body Move

== Episodes ==
No. overall	No. in series	Title	Song of the Week	Theme	Original release date
391	1	"Playing Games"	Playtime	Playtime	7 July 2008
Stevie plays a copycat game on his bongo drums, with Charli and Kellie replicating his rhythms. Charli sneaks around like a rat while wearing gloves on her hands. Kellie hides a scone somewhere around the room and challenges Chats to guess where it is. Charli pretends to juggle scones in the air to cool them down. Fit Bit Tips: Nathan and Stevie learn how to kick a soccer ball. Sun invents a jumping game to play outdoors with a skipping rope. Charli pretends to be a horse jumping over hurdles in an obstacle course. Nathan follows a series of clues to uncover a mystery occupation. Charli works as the referee at a soccer game. Sharing Stories: Sun tells a story about a boy (Nathan) who goes on a picnic with his grandparents (Charli, Kellie, and Stevie), where they teach him some of the games they played as children.
392	2	"Dress Ups"	Playtime	Playtime	8 July 2008
Kellie and Chats imagine travelling across the land, sea, and ice in a hovercraft. Charli moves like a penguin dancing on the ice. Nathan imagines becoming a muscly superhero with the power of super strength. Charli pretends to be a floppy ragdoll energising herself with exercise. Fit Bit Tips: Nathan and Stevie learn how to tie shoelaces. Stevie dresses up as a toucan to conduct his toucan orchestra for a piece of waltz music. Charli and Stevie practise the toucan waltz and can-can dance. Sun operates a bulldozer in order to clear a space for a new playground. Charli dresses up as a chef. Sharing Stories: Kellie makes up a story about a group of friends who stage a performance featuring a puppeteer (Charli), her puppet (Nathan), a pop star (Sun), and a breakdancer (Stevie).
393	3	"Silly is Good"	Playtime	Playtime	9 July 2008
Sun visits the farm, where Jup Jup causes the animals to make mixed-up sounds. Charli pretends to be a chicken rehearsing for a barn dance. Nathan prepares for boxing training with Stevie, but misinterprets the idea and dresses up in boxes. Charli pretends to be a cat boxing with a ball of wool. Fit Bit Tips: Nathan and Stevie learn how to spin a hula hoop. Stevie invents a new musical instrument which makes a variety of silly sounds. Charli performs a song with silly sounds and unusual movements to match them. Kellie and Chats add fruit and vegetables to their hats and think of names to describe their silly designs. Charli plays basketball as Sun holds the basket over her head. Sharing Stories: Stevie tells a story about the inhabitants of a town (Charli, Sun, and Nathan) renowned for giggling, who try to get their laughter back when the giggling suddenly stops, by seeking inspiration from an eccentric bird (Kellie).
394	4	"Puzzles"	Playtime	Playtime	10 July 2008
Sun builds a miniature track for a model train and solves the puzzle of making the track larger. Charli uses her body to form a tunnel over tracks for a train to travel through. Kellie and Chats make up a series of riddles to share and solve with each other. Charli pretends to be a frog on a lily pad who has the hiccups. Fit Bit Tips: Nathan and Stevie learn how to play cricket. Stevie challenges himself to craft new musical instruments using a variety of recycled materials. Charli tries to complete different physical challenges before the buzzer sounds. Nathan builds a city using his large shape puzzle pieces. Charli drives a taxi around the city. Sharing Stories: Nathan tells a story about a magical teacher (Stevie) at a wizardry school, who sets the puzzle for his students (Charli, Kellie, and Sun) to guess his first name.
395	5	"Imaginary Friends and Places"	Playtime	Playtime	11 July 2008
Nathan imagines becoming a washing genie who can magically fold his clothes while doing the laundry. Charli makes a paper card in the shape of a love heart for her mother's birthday. Sun imagines visiting a land full of flowers, where she discovers some unusual plants and creatures. Charli pretends to be a spiky echidna trying to keep a balloon up in the air. Fit Bit Tips: Nathan and Stevie learn how to balance on an exercise ball. Stevie sings a duet with an imaginary double of himself. Charli dances alongside a silly clone of herself. Kellie is introduced to Chats's imaginary friend and tries to make him feel welcome. Charli digs for potatoes in a potato patch. Sharing Stories: Charli tells a story about a girl (Sun) with an imaginary friend (Nathan) who her parents (Kellie and Stevie) fail to recognise, before he helps out while preparing for a family road trip.
396	6	"Different Families"	We're a Family	Family	14 July 2008
Nathan works as an artist painting a portrait of a family. Charli takes fun photographs of herself to give to her family. Kellie and Chats pretend to be the parents of a potato which is decorated to look like a baby. Fit Bit Tips: Nathan and Stevie learn how to balance on an exercise ball. Sun sorts a variety of shapes into family groups according to their different features. Charli collects eggs from the barn at her family farm. Stevie receives a parcel from his grandfather who is travelling the world in search of music. Charli performs a traditional Russian Cossack dance. Sharing Stories: Sun tells a story about a family of rangers (Charli, Nathan, Kellie, and Stevie) who go on a treasure hunt in the bushlands while exploring a mysterious sound.
397	7	"Animals and Pets"	We're a Family	Family	15 July 2008
Kellie pretends to be a mountain lion who stumbles upon the burrow home of a gopher (Chats). Stevie visits the family farm and writes a song about the animals that live there. Charli tries to shoo away a buzzing fly on the farm. Fit Bit Tips: Nathan and Stevie learn how to play fetch with a dog. Nathan decorates a swivel chair and turns it into a pet that rolls around. Charli stretches her body after using the computer. Sun works at a clinic for kittens and measures them to see how they have grown. Charli looks after a friend's pet puppy. Sharing Stories: Charli tells a story about a family of puppies (Sun, Stevie, and Kellie) who visit the backyard for the first time to learn tricks from their grandfather (Nathan).
398	8	"Family Holiday"	We're a Family	Family	16 July 2008
Kellie and Chats go on a road trip and play an observation game while travelling in the car. Charli tries to keep her body active with exercise on a long car trip. Stevie holidays in the Australian bush and makes music with the sounds of the bush creatures. Charli dresses up as a cowgirl and practises cracking a whip at the ranch. Fit Bit Tips: Nathan and Stevie learn how to play a jump rope game. Nathan imagines taking a family holiday to the jungle for an adventurous vacation. Charli pretends to be a leopard doing her stretches. Sun packs her bags for a weekend trip with her family while Jup Jup helps her load the essential items. Charli finds a way to carry Hi-5's holiday luggage at once. Sharing Stories: Kellie tells a story about two children (Charli and Stevie) who use their imaginations to transform their car ride with their parents (Sun and Nathan) into a fun adventure.
399	9	"Getting Along"	We're a Family	Family	17 July 2008
Nathan practises dancing to all of the favourite styles of his different family members. Charli pretends to be the leader of a marching band while dusting. Kellie and Chats learn how to share and get along while having a sleepover together. Charli and Kellie dress up as scarecrow sisters. Fit Bit Tips: Nathan and Stevie learn how to run a three-legged race. Sun collects a variety of flowers give to her grandmother when she visits. Charli picks lemons from a tree and works out how to carry them. Stevie and Nathan play the guitar together before Sun and Kellie add their own different styles of music. Charli performs a dance for the moon and the stars while Nathan plays the guitar. Sharing Stories: Stevie tells a story about an imaginary land where the people (Charli, Kellie, Sun, and Nathan) display pictorial representations of their mood at all times, which leads to confusion when their emotion bubbles disappear.
400	10	"Doing Things Together"	We're a Family	Family	18 July 2008
Sun runs a shoe store for animals and finds suitable pairs for a family of bears. Charli performs a rain dance in the hope of summoning wet weather to play in. Kellie teaches Chats about the parts of their boat when they go sailing together. Charli finds a message in a bottle with instructions for actions inside. Fit Bit Tips: Nathan and Stevie learn how to throw a frisbee. Nathan uses his body to spell the word "family" with the help of the rest of Hi-5. Charli performs a cheer to celebrate her family. Stevie and Nathan practise their basketball skills by keeping in time to a song. Charli practises moving the basketball in different ways. Sharing Stories: Nathan tells a story about a family of pandas (Stevie, Sun, Charli, and Kellie) who decide to try a new and exciting way of marching in their annual parade.
401	11	"Backyards and Recycling"	Planet Earth	Planet Earth	21 July 2008
Kellie recycles Chats's old cardboard boxes by turning them into a pretend cargo ship. Charli pretends to be a tugboat steering an ocean liner through the dock. Nathan cleans up the backyard after a storm and makes sculptures with the leaves and sticks. Charli moves like an earthworm transporting food along the ground. Fit Bit Tips: Nathan and Stevie learn how to jump in puddles. Stevie sorts his recycling while making music with the bins. Charli turns her metal trash cans into a drum kit. Sun builds a sculpture of a cow using recycled plastic bottles. Charli dances like a reindeer in the snowy forest. Sharing Stories: Charli tells a story about a group of worker elves (Kellie, Sun, Nathan, and Stevie) making paper from bark, who must think of a solution when their supply of bark is depleted.
402	12	"Adventures"	Planet Earth	Planet Earth	22 July 2008
Sun dresses up as a polar bear and uses stepping stones of ice to cross an Arctic river. Charli skis down a snowy mountain. Nathan makes a mural to celebrate the world, its people, and natural features. Charli practises kicking moves while dressed up as a horse. Fit Bit Tips: Nathan and Stevie learn how to play cricket. Stevie sings jazz music to help a garden of trees grow. Charli pretends to be a seed growing into a tree. Kellie returns from a trip to the beach and imagines cleaning up rubbish under the sea. Charli pretends to be a humpback whale. Sharing Stories: Kellie tells a story about a superhero called Eco Boy (Nathan), who journeys into space to save the world and his family (Stevie, Sun, and Charli) from a blob of sludge blocking the sun.
403	13	"Wild Life"	Planet Earth	Planet Earth	23 July 2008
Sun journeys into the bush at night in search of nocturnal animals. Charli pretends to be an owl sleepwalking during the daytime. Kellie tests out Chats's new invention of a chair which replicates different weather scenarios. Charli twirls a ribbon to look like a whirlpool in the ocean. Fit Bit Tips: Nathan and Stevie learn how to scale a rock climbing wall. Stevie and Nathan pretend to be mutton birds migrating to the other side of the world while singing a special song. Charli becomes an eco-warrior and sings about the animals. Nathan pretends to be a termite who tap dances while building a mound in the dirt. Charli pretends to be a football-playing ant. Sharing Stories: Sun tells a story about four friends (Charli, Kellie, Nathan, and Stevie) who set off for a day at sea on their boat, but encounter trouble when the weather becomes rough and stormy.
404	14	"Exploring"	Planet Earth	Planet Earth	24 July 2008
Kellie and Chats imagine being space explorers arriving on Earth for the first time. Charli explores Paris while searching for the Eiffel Tower. Sun dresses up as a pirate and draws a map to show where her treasure is hidden. Fit Bit Tips: Nathan and Stevie learn how to climb a rope ladder. Stevie explores the backyard in search of interesting percussive sounds to record. Charli plays a pair of tapping sticks. Nathan travels through the desert in a dune buggy and looks for an oasis. Charli pretends to be a flamingo balancing in a waterhole. Sharing Stories: Stevie tells a story about a group of monkeys (Charli, Nathan, Kellie, and Sun) working as space explorers, who land their spaceship on a fascinating new planet.
405	15	"Land and Sea"	Planet Earth	Planet Earth	25 July 2008
Nathan goes on a deep-sea diving adventure at the bottom of the ocean and discovers a variety of fishes. Charli pretends to be a clownfish. Kellie answers Chats's questions to be rewarded with entry onto her imaginary island. Charli dresses up as a mermaid for an underwater hula dance. Fit Bit Tips: Nathan and Stevie learn how to paddle a kayak. Stevie goes surfing and meets some singing fish, who help him move in harmony with the ocean. Charli pretends to be a duck dancing in a chorus line. Sun works as the captain of a rescue boat searching for lost watercraft at sea. Charli uses her beach towel to hop across the hot sand and get to the water. Sharing Stories: Nathan tells a story about a school of fish (Charli, Sun, and Stevie) who learn to listen to their teacher (Kellie) when she relays some important ocean skills.
406	16	"Trying Out New Things"	The Best Things in Life Are Free	Be Free	28 July 2008
Nathan recalls his first day of kindergarten and the song he sang to introduce himself to his classmates. Charli reenacts how she would move around during lunchtime at kindergarten. Kellie and Chats use rhyming words to remember the actions for a taekwondo pattern. Charli exercises with a workout routine. Fit Bit Tips: Nathan and Stevie learn how to perform a tai chi routine. Stevie pretends to be a crow who teaches his friends how to sing in an operatic style. Charli dresses up as a magician to perform a trick. Sun dresses up in a tomato costume to make a salad sandwich for lunch. Charli sings about her favourite vegetables. Sharing Stories: Stevie tells a story about a group of animals (Charli, Sun, and Nathan) with different skills, who encourage their donkey friend (Kellie) to try something new and practise yodelling.
407	17	"Daring"	The Best Things in Life Are Free	Be Free	29 July 2008
Sun pretends to be a joey trying to break her jumping record. Charli dresses up as a koala for rocking and rolling movements. Kellie and Chats visit the swap shop to replace their old gardening clothes with something new. Charli tries on gloves which help her to imagine performing different jobs. Fit Bit Tips: Nathan and Stevie learn how to ride a scooter. Stevie climbs a mountain and uses musical signals to inform Nathan of his location. Charli pretends to be a superhero scaling buildings to rescue a cat. Nathan pretends to be a show pony rehearsing his daring show tricks. Charli becomes a daring motorcycle rider and practises her moves on the track. Sharing Stories: Nathan tells a story about four very different toys (Stevie, Kellie, Sun, and Charli) living in a toy store, who come to life and dare each other to try performing a different role.
408	18	"Making Your Own Fun"	The Best Things in Life Are Free	Be Free	30 July 2008
Nathan imagines living in a world completely made up of recycled paper and cardboard. Charli pretends to be a doll being dressed with paper clothes. Sun composes a musical pattern with kitchen utensils while washing up the dishes. Charli moves like a washing machine on a spin cycle. Fit Bit Tips: Nathan and Stevie learn how to throw a frisbee. Stevie makes sound effects using a microphone to accompany an imaginary adventure story. Charli plays with an inflatable beach ball. Kellie and Chats complete a crossword puzzle by miming the words. Charli plays a clapping game to remember her spelling words. Sharing Stories: Sun makes up a story about four gypsies (Stevie, Kellie, Charli, and Nathan) living in a caravan, who learn how to make their own fun after gazing into a crystal ball.
409	19	"Things to Do"	The Best Things in Life Are Free	Be Free	31 July 2008
Nathan pretends to be a knight who decides to change his appearance with updated clothing and armour. Charli imagines being a court jester who entertains royalty with a song and dance performance. Kellie cleans the bedroom and follows a series of messages written on paper planes, which Chats has left throughout the room. Charli reads the messages on a paper chatterbox. Fit Bit Tips: Nathan and Stevie learn how to make paper planes. Stevie tidies up the shed and finds a variety of garden tools and equipment to make music with. Charli pretends to build something in the shed. Sun tries to find a way to catch a stream of rain as it leaks through the roof at an increasing pace. Charli cleans an imaginary window. Sharing Stories: Kellie tells a story about a young inventor (Stevie) and his three friends (Nathan, Sun, and Charli) who help him build umbrella hats to allow them to play outside in the rain.
410	20	"Hi-5 Fun Park"	The Best Things in Life Are Free	Be Free	1 August 2008
Charli pretends to be a ringmaster and introduces the Hi-5 fun park. Stevie manages the dodgem car ride and signals the drivers with different percussive sounds. Nathan sets up a game of skittles using oversized bowling pins and a large beach ball. Charli walks on stilts. Sun plays a magnetic fishing game and tries to catch different sized ducks to win a prize. Charli pretends to wear magnet-powered gloves. Kellie and Chats imagine travelling through space on a flying saucer ride. Charli moves forwards and backwards in the carriage of an umbrella ride. Sharing Stories: Charli tells a story about a group of insects (Kellie, Stevie, and Sun) who journey to a natural fun park, where they search for a slow ride for their snail friend (Nathan).
411	21	"Fairyland"	Abracadabra	Abracadabra	4 August 2008
Nathan pretends to be a fairy construction worker paving a stone pathway for a parade. Charli pretends to be a fairy completing her athletics training. Kellie helps Chats to prepare for a visit from the imaginary "hairy fairy". Fit Bit Tips: Nathan and Stevie learn how to jump over hurdles. Stevie pretends to be a musical elf composing a national anthem for the land of fairies. Charli choreographs a dance for a group of magical creatures. Sun holds a pixie-themed picnic in the garden. Charli crafts a daisy chain bracelet. Sharing Stories: Kellie tells the story of how she once was magically transported to the imaginary Fairyland, where she meets a fairy (Charli), a butterfly (Sun), a pixie (Stevie), and a troll (Nathan).
412	22	"Making Magic"	Abracadabra	Abracadabra	5 August 2008
Nathan crafts different-shaped wizard hats and magically changes their sizes. Charli tests out three magic wands which move in different ways. Kellie dresses up as a magician and tries to recall the magic word needed to make a rabbit appear from a hat. Charli dresses up as a gorilla for a showstopping dancing act. Fit Bit Tips: Nathan and Stevie learn how to play tennis. Stevie searches for instruments to accompany Nathan's magic tricks. Charli performs a magical disappearing act. Sun stages a series of magic tricks using balloons. Sharing Stories: Kellie tells the story of how she once returned to Fairyland to help her fairy friend (Charli) paint a sunset in the sky, along with the butterfly (Sun), a pixie (Stevie), and a troll (Nathan).
413	23	"Magical Creatures"	Abracadabra	Abracadabra	6 August 2008
Sun designs a silver cat costume for a fantasy-themed disco. Nathan dresses up as a troll and finds a space to build his cave. Charli pretends to be a bat living in a troll's cave. Fit Bit Tips: Nathan and Stevie learn how to play beach volleyball. Stevie discovers how a griffin might make music with its different body parts. Charli imagines what a chicken and a monkey would look like if they were combined. Kellie and Chats create a description for the mythical bunyip creature. Charli pretends to be an iguana with dreams of becoming a dragon. Sharing Stories: Kellie tells the story of how she once helped her magical friends in Fairyland (Charli, Sun, Stevie, and Nathan) prepare for a visit from the tooth fairy, before the lost tooth went missing.
414	24	"Magical Journeys"	Abracadabra	Abracadabra	7 August 2008
Sun imagines being a mermaid and counting fish in the coral reef. Charli goes for a bouncy ride on a seahorse. Nathan creates a diorama of an enchanted forest and wonders what it would be like to visit. Charli looks into a magic mirror. Fit Bit Tips: Nathan and Stevie learn how to skip with a rope. Stevie pretends to be a bug looking for other fairy musicians to form a band with. Kellie and Chats imagine floating to the top of a blossom tree in a bubble and meeting a sprite. Charli pretends to be a water sprite. Sharing Stories: Chats tells the story of how Kellie once visited her magical friends in Fairyland (Charli, Sun, Stevie, and Nathan) at springtime and travelled to the end of a rainbow with them.
415	25	"Magical Stories"	Abracadabra	Abracadabra	8 August 2008
Stevie directs a musical about a group of elves going on holiday. Charli moves around like an elf. Nathan crafts two marionette puppets and explores how they move differently. Fit Bit Tips: Nathan and Stevie learn how to throw and catch a ball. Kellie encourages Chats to think of a new theme for her fairy story when she dresses up in the wrong costume. Charli dresses in a mixed-up fairy costume for a party. Sun tells a bedtime story to two babies at a daycare for fairies. Charli pretends to be a baby fairy. Sharing Stories: Kellie tells the story of how she once celebrated her birthday in Fairyland with her friends (Sun, Nathan, Stevie, and Charli), who helped her magically become a fairy for the day.
416	26	"Wild and Wacky"	Jump and Shout	Jump and Shout	11 August 2008
Kellie competes on Chats's silly television game show, where she must act like a dog. Charli and Kellie play a game of leap frog. Sun decorates her space with amusing sun shapes. Charli dresses up as a lion with a sunny personality. Fit Bit Tips: Nathan and Stevie learn how to tie shoelaces. Stevie dreams of visiting a land full of unusual musical instruments and sounds. Charli pretends to be an ant in a marching band. Nathan crafts two quirky characters using potatoes, and dresses up as a potato himself. Charli and Nathan compete in a series of potato-themed games. Sharing Stories: Charli tells a story about three friends (Sun, Kellie, and Nathan) who visit their friend (Stevie) to test out his new invention; a machine which can instantly change the outfit that its user is wearing.
417	27	"Move It"	Jump and Shout	Jump and Shout	12 August 2008
Kellie and Chats think of new dance moves to perform at an outer space-themed disco. Charli works as a DJ while dancing to the disco music. Sun rehearses a traditional poi performance. Charli imagines being a balloon deflating at a party. Fit Bit Tips: Nathan and Stevie learn how to run a three-legged race. Stevie and Charli practise moving and making music while wearing wooden clogs. Charli pretends to be a windmill moving in the breeze. Nathan thinks of silly ways to walk and uses symbols to represent the movements. Charli uses footprints on the floor as a guide for different ways to move. Sharing Stories: Nathan tells a story about a flock of dancing sheep (Sun, Stevie, and Charli) who rehearse a routine for a barn dance, and seek inspiration from a new lamb (Kellie) with different moves.
418	28	"Dress Up"	Jump and Shout	Jump and Shout	13 August 2008
Nathan finds a collection of hats and moves in a different way while wearing each of them. Charli wears coats associated with different jobs. Sun tries on a range of shoes while searching for her soccer boots. Charli tries to walk across sand while wearing flippers. Fit Bit Tips: Nathan and Stevie learn how to throw a frisbee. Stevie looks for natural items in the bush that he can make music with. Charli and Sun perform a bush dance. Kellie helps Chats to caption photographs of herself wearing different costumes. Charli changes her face to express different moods. Sharing Stories: Stevie makes up a story about a hat maker (Kellie) who sells her silly hats to an array of customers (Sun, Charli, and Nathan) for a special celebration.
419	29	"Exploring and Finding Out"	Jump and Shout	Jump and Shout	14 August 2008
Nathan becomes a backyard investigator when he tries to discover who left a trail of footprints outside. Charli stretches in the garden while standing like a tall gum tree. Kellie and Chats imagine being microscopic and meeting microbes inside a drop of water. Charli moves like a small dog and a large dog. Fit Bit Tips: Nathan and Stevie learn how to play fetch with a dog. Stevie pretends to be a genie who travels to a village to fix musical instruments. Charli busks on the streets with a tambourine. Sun prepares a pasta dish for lunch. Sharing Stories: Sun tells a story about a family (Nathan, Kellie, Charli, and Stevie) renowned for making mistakes, who set off on a holiday but forget to bring their caravan.
420	30	"Move Your Body"	Jump and Shout	Jump and Shout	15 August 2008
Kellie bumps her funny bone and visits Chats, who is pretending to be a doctor, for an x-ray. Sun creates a workout routine with exercises inspired by the panther. Charli demonstrates how she uses the different muscles in her body. Fit Bit Tips: Nathan and Stevie learn how to scale a rock climbing wall. Stevie pretends to be a turtle who searches the beach for new ways to make drumming sounds. Charli stretches like a slow turtle. Nathan practises balancing objects of different shapes with different parts of his body. Charli balances on water skis. Sharing Stories: Kellie tells a story about two jungle animals (Sun and Nathan) who encourage their flamingo friend (Charli) to visit the doctor (Stevie) before a gymnastics competition.
421	31	"Future"	When I Grow Up	Tomorrow	18 August 2008
Kellie pretends to be a robot who follows Chats's instructions in order to make a sandwich. Charli pretends to be a piece of bread in a toaster. Nathan imagines navigating his way around a futuristic space station by following the signs. Charli pretends to be a teddy bear from outer space. Fit Bit Tips: Nathan and Stevie learn how to long jump. Stevie imagines a future where Hi-5 teleport to different concert venues to perform a range of music genres. Charli dances to the music at a rock concert. Sun wonders what she will look like as a grandmother in the future, and uses dress-ups to help imagine. Charli runs a galactic hair salon and styles futuristic wigs. Sharing Stories: Nathan tells a story about three aliens (Sun, Charli, and Stevie) who advertise for a traffic conductor (Kellie) to direct their spaceships in outer space.
422	32	"What's On Tomorrow?"	When I Grow Up	Tomorrow	19 August 2008
Sun prepares some games for a play date with her cousin. Charli exercises her fingers with an obstacle course. Kellie dresses in animal costumes to become a mascot for the Hi-5 hockey team. Charli plays a game of hockey against Nathan. Fit Bit Tips: Nathan and Stevie learn how to catch with a softball mitt. Stevie conducts a choir of puppies and kittens for a singing performance and encourages them to work together. Charli conducts an imaginary orchestra. Nathan designs an alien costume to wear to a dress-up party. Charli and Kellie dress up as singing alien twins. Sharing Stories: Stevie tells the story about four busy friends (Charli, Sun, Nathan, and Kellie) living in a fast-paced town, who learn to change their lifestyle when their strict schedule is disturbed.
423	33	"Looking Forward"	When I Grow Up	Tomorrow	20 August 2008
Nathan becomes a rescue worker and helps to clean up the community after a storm. Charli mimes the actions of a woodchopper. Kellie participates in Chats's pretend radio show by phoning in to identify mystery sound effects. Charli listens to the sounds of nature while walking outside. Fit Bit Tips: Nathan and Stevie learn how to run fast. Stevie imagines making music with cows on a futuristic farm. Charli performs a dance with maracas. Sun works as an architect and designs a futuristic cubby house for her toys. Charli pretends to be a stink bug showering beneath a flower. Sharing Stories: Kellie tells a story about a knight (Nathan) who brings his son (Stevie) to work, and tries to teach him how to rescue a princess (Charli) and a dragon (Sun).
424	34	"Our World in the Future"	When I Grow Up	Tomorrow	21 August 2008
Nathan works as a scientist and invents a futuristic new shape. Charli choreographs a dance representing different shapes. Sun visits the backyard at night to stargaze, searching for patterns of stars in the sky. Charli pretends to go fishing for stars from a spaceship. Fit Bit Tips: Nathan and Stevie learn how to paddle a kayak. Stevie makes music using an augmented reality system that displays virtual instruments. Charli plays an imaginary flute. Kellie and Chats prepare futuristic dishes for an outer space-themed feast. Charli hosts an intergalactic cooking show. Sharing Stories: Charli tells a story about an inventor (Stevie) who creates an exercise machine which his three friends (Nathan, Kellie, and Sun) test out.
425	35	"Ways to Get Around in the Future"	When I Grow Up	Tomorrow	22 August 2008
Stevie drives a futuristic car which is activated by the power of singing. Charli moves while singing at different speeds. Sun explores the shapes of different wings. Charli dresses up as an angel for a stretching routine. Fit Bit Tips: Nathan and Stevie learn how to ride a bicycle. Kellie and Chats test out a new teleportation device. Charli transports to different lands with a range of movement styles. Nathan pretends to be a space probe collecting samples of a new planet to take back to Earth. Charli pretends to be a monster stuck in intergalactic mud. Sharing Stories: Charli tells a story about a mechanic (Nathan) who services three different cars (Stevie, Sun, and Kellie), each with their own set of problems.
426	36	"Gadgets"	Techno World	Techno World	25 August 2008
Nathan uses gadgets to repair a satellite in outer space. Charli pretends to be a satellite dish receiving a signal from outer space. Kellie and Chats wear hats which help them to search for the opposites of words. Charli practises a dance with opposite movements. Fit Bit Tips: Nathan and Stevie learn how to run fast. Stevie creates new ringtones for his friends' mobile phones. Charli pretends to be a ballerina dancer from a music box. Sun uses a blender to make a fruit smoothie. Charli uses her body to stir an imaginary mixture. Sharing Stories: Charli tells a story about a professor (Sun) who invents three new robots (Stevie, Nathan, and Kellie) to help with jobs around the house, before they become tired of working.
427	37	"Contraptions"	Techno World	Techno World	26 August 2008
Sun works as a mail carrier delivering packages around the world in a plane. Charli poses like a sphinx in a postcard. Kellie and Chats communicate using walkie-talkies. Charli pretends to be a super spy on a secret mission. Fit Bit Tips: Nathan and Stevie learn how to play beach volleyball. Stevie invents a machine which plays music to match different emotions. Charli uses a machine which makes her walk in silly ways. Nathan makes a collage using recycled pieces of electronic devices. Charli dresses up as a robot butterfly. Sharing Stories: Kellie tells a story about four friends (Stevie, Sun, Nathan, and Charli) who go on a magical windsurfing adventure through the skies.
428	38	"Computer World"	Techno World	Techno World	27 August 2008
Nathan is controlled by Stevie when he takes the form of a character inside a video game. Charli imagines using remote-controlled shoes to help her run. Kellie programs a virtual version of herself and teaches it how to speak. Charli practises her programmed movements with a virtual version of herself. Fit Bit Tips: Nathan and Stevie learn how to play tennis. Stevie imagines having an electronic pet made of computer parts. Charli pretends to be an electronic pet. Sun does some online shopping when she orders groceries through the computer. Sharing Stories: Stevie tells a story about four friends (Charli, Kellie, Nathan, and Sun) who all have the same name, and use the internet to solve their problem when they struggle to live together.
429	39	"Time Travel"	Techno World	Techno World	28 August 2008
Nathan imagines travelling back to prehistoric times and meeting a baby triceratops. Charli pretends to be a caveperson playing a ball game. Kellie and Chats use a sound recorder to capture examples of onomatopoeia words. Fit Bit Tips: Nathan and Stevie learn how to ride a bicycle. Stevie imagines what musical instruments will look like in the future. Charli imagines surfing through space on a rocket-powered surfboard. Sun does her morning stretches and counts to keep track. Charli does a stretching routine before bed. Sharing Stories: Sun tells a story about three children (Charli, Kellie and, Nathan) who search for missing socks using their friend's (Stevie) new mind-reading invention.
430	40	"Sending Messages"	Techno World	Techno World	29 August 2008
Kellie and Chats help the rest of Hi-5 to interpret a series of email messages they have received. Charli performs a cheer for a party. Sun attends to the needs of a small electronic toy pet. Fit Bit Tips: Nathan and Stevie learn how to throw and catch a ball. Stevie works as a musical courier while riding a bicycle powered by song. Charli pretends to be a carrier pigeon that delivers mail. Nathan explores a solar-powered helicopter and imagines having solar panels himself. Charli pretends to be a solar-powered racing car driver. Sharing Stories: Nathan tells a story about four animal statues (Charli, Sun, Stevie, and Kellie) from a carousel, who come to life and explore their new surroundings.
431	41	"Fun Action"	Come Alive	Come Alive	1 September 2008
Kellie and Chats hold a relay race with the whole of Hi-5 competing as a team. Charli mimes the actions of a swimming, rowing, and skiing in a race. Nathan keeps warm by finds different ways to play with a long canvas tunnel. Charli finds different ways to jump. Fit Bit Tips: Nathan and Stevie learn how to run fast. Stevie pretends to be an elephant rehearsing different styles of dance with his herd. Charli practises ballet moves. Sun plays a game with a hacky sack. Charli demonstrates tricks that a seal might perform. Sharing Stories: Chats tells a story about an annual party in the woodlands, where five purple ants (Stevie, Charli, Nathan, Kellie, and Sun) gather to celebrate.
432	42	"Recharge"	Come Alive	Come Alive	2 September 2008
Sun pretends to refuel a helicopter by filling its tank. Charli moves her arms like spinning helicopter blades. Kellie falls asleep and trains for an athletics carnival while sleepwalking. Charli recharges with some stretches. Fit Bit Tips: Nathan and Stevie learn how to jump over hurdles. Stevie works as a doctor and uses music to help animals feel better. Charli uses movement to encourage a snake to shed its skin. Nathan plays a game involving movement and different shapes of fruits. Charli plays musical chairs with the rest of Hi-5. Sharing Stories: Charli tells a story about a mechanic (Nathan) who helps three different cars (Stevie, Sun, and Kellie) to recharge before they all compete in a big race.
433	43	"Getting Focused"	Come Alive	Come Alive	3 September 2008
Nathan follows a map in search of a golden dragon statue. Charli pretends to be a bumblebee focusing on a flower while balancing. Kellie retraces her footsteps to try and remember where she left her headband. Charli rakes the leaves in the garden. Fit Bit Tips: Nathan and Stevie learn how to balance on an exercise ball. Stevie relaxes in the garden and focuses with yoga poses. Charli pretends to be a fast moving hummingbird. Sun tries to throw Velcro balls onto a target. Charli plays golf and putts the ball. Sharing Stories: Sun tells a story about a Christmas eve where the reindeer (Charli and Kellie) and an elf (Nathan) try to help Santa (Stevie) find his lost sack of presents by recalling where he last left them.
434	44	"World Outside"	Come Alive	Come Alive	4 September 2008
Sun rides her scooter around a track outside. Charli and Nathan race around the backyard in a billy cart. Nathan operates a pretend bulldozer and uses it to shift heavy piles of rubble. Charli plays with mud. Fit Bit Tips: Nathan and Stevie learn how to play beach volleyball. Stevie becomes a surf lifesaver and carries out his drills. Charli practises her baseball playing skills. Kellie and Chats complete an orienteering course outside. Charli acts as the captain of a ship steering the wheel. Sharing Stories: Stevie tells a story about four cowhands (Charli, Kellie, Nathan, and Sun) who try to work together to complete their farm chores for the day.
435	45	"Being a Team Player"	Come Alive	Come Alive	5 September 2008
Sun completes her basketball training and practises different skills with the ball. Charli and Kellie pretend to play tennis as a doubles team. Kellie and Chats try to work together to operate a pretend toboggan. Charli helps a pair of sock puppets to coordinate their movements. Fit Bit Tips: Nathan and Stevie learn how to play tennis. Stevie leads his team of piano players through an energetic musical rehearsal. Charli claps along to music from a piano. Nathan completes an exercise circuit with a life-size puppet attached to his back. Charli and Sun do a stretching routine together. Sharing Stories: Nathan tells a story about a troupe of gymnastic crocodiles (Stevie, Sun, and Charli) who try to incorporate the unique style of their friend (Kellie) into their routine.

== Home video releases ==
Series	DVD Title	Release date (Region 4)	Songs of the Week	Special features	Ref.
10	Playtime!	DVD: 2 October 2008	Playtime; When I Grow Up; Planet Earth; Techno World; Abracadabra	"Hi-5's Cool Dance School" featurette, including songs "Celebrate", "Hi-5 Base to Outer Space", "How Much Do I Love You?", "E-N-E-R-G-Y", and "Going Out".	
10	Jump and Shout	DVD: 5 January 2009	Jump and Shout; Come Alive; We're a Family; The Best Things in Life Are Free	"Hi-5's Cool Dance School" featurette, including songs "Give Five", "Come On and Party", "I Believe in Magic", "Holiday", and "Underwater Discovery".	
