= Hi-5 series 9 =

Hi-5
- Series 9
- Starring: Kellie Crawford; Nathan Foley; Tim Harding; Sun Park; Charli Robinson
- No. of episodes: 45

Release
- Original network: Nine Network
- Original release: 11 June – 10 August 2007

Season chronology
- ← Previous; Series 8 Next → Series 10

The ninth series of the children's television series Hi-5 aired between 11 June 2007 and 10 August 2007 on the Nine Network in Australia. The series was produced by Kids Like Us for Nine with Helena Harris as executive producer.

This was the first series to feature Sun Park, replacing Kathleen de Leon Jones, who makes three guest appearances throughout the series. It was also the last series to feature Tim Harding.

== Production ==
Prior to production of the ninth series of Hi-5 in 2006, Kathleen de Leon Jones announced that she was pregnant, and that she would take maternity leave from the Hi-5 group from April onwards. de Leon Jones had previously been involved in the filming of the eighth series, which did not air until June, after she had departed. Sun Park was introduced as her temporary replacement, while de Leon Jones gave birth to her first child in July. Park took de Leon Jones' place for the group's touring, and production of the ninth series in 2006.

The ninth series premiered on 11 June 2007, with de Leon Jones making a guest appearance to announce her pregnancy and introduce Park to viewers. She made two further appearances throughout the series, including one return along with her daughter. de Leon Jones stated that it was important to explain her pregnancy to the young audience, and show that "she [hadn't] just disappeared". Park added, "it comforts [children] to know that Kathleen has passed that trust down to me". Creator and executive producer Helena Harris stated that by 2007, "Hi-5 [was] still evolving and maintaining its relevance and freshness". Kellie Crawford, Nathan Foley, Tim Harding, and Charli Robinson all returned for the series.

While de Leon Jones initially stated that she was intent on returning to Hi-5, she later made the decision to permanently leave the group to focus on being a mother. Park took her place as a permanent member with the group, during the airing of the ninth series in 2007. The ninth series was also the last to feature Tim Harding, who departed from the group later in the year.

== Cast ==
=== Presenters ===
- Kellie Crawford – Word Play
- Nathan Foley – Shapes in Space
- Tim Harding – Making Music
- Sun Park – Puzzles and Patterns
- Charli Robinson – Body Move

=== Guest ===
- Kathleen de Leon Jones (Note: de Leon Jones makes three guest appearances throughout the series; in the episodes "Babies", "Birthdays" and "Feasts and Festivals".)

== Episodes ==
No. overall	No. in series	Title	Song of the Week	Theme	Original release date
346	1	"Babies"	Around the World	World	11 June 2007
Kathleen announces that she is having a baby, and invites her friend Sun to take care of her space while she is away. Charli pretends to be a dancing baby. Nathan tries to find a way to carry his teddy bear in a Mexican rebozo. Charli plays peek-a-boo. Tim writes a lullaby for Kathleen's baby using an African djembe drum. Charli claps and stamps to African lullaby music in big and small ways. Kellie tries to figure out how to stop baby Chats from crying. Charli does some slow and gentle aqua aerobics. Sharing Stories: Kathleen tells a story about a group of baby African animals (Charli, Sun, Nathan, and Tim) who try to discover what is special about their new friend (Kellie).
347	2	"Birthdays"	Around the World	World	12 June 2007
Kellie and Chats imagine flying around the world to say "happy birthday" to all of the new babies. Charli pretends to be a plane sending a birthday message. Sun prepares presents from around the world to give to Kathleen's new baby. Charli performs a Brazilian Carnival dance. Tim makes a Mexican piñata for a party game and tests it out with Kellie and Nathan. Charli makes music with a pair of cymbals. Nathan plays a blindfolded guessing game, matching ears and tails to pictures of animals from around the world. Charli pretends to be a disco-dancing donkey. Sharing Stories: Chats tells the story of Kathleen's baby shower, where Kellie, Tim, Nathan, Charli, and Sun try to surprise her with an around-the-world themed feast.
348	3	"First Day of School"	Around the World	World	13 June 2007
Nathan makes a German schultüte for his friend's first day of school. Charli pretends to be a schultüte dancing her first day nerves away. Sun dresses up for a cold day of school in snowy Alaska. Charli practises skiing down an imaginary slope. Tim becomes a school cook and makes a special Italian pizza for the new students. Charli counts to five in Italian. Kellie and Chats use radio equipment to communicate with each other and act out a day of radio school. Charli the elephant cools off with some water. Sharing Stories: Nathan tells a story about a bilby (Tim) who sings a song with his mother (Charli) to help him feel confident on his first day of school, where he meets his teacher (Sun) and makes a friend (Kellie).
349	4	"Meals"	Around the World	World	14 June 2007
Kellie helps Chats make her international cuisine sound more appealing by changing the names of the dishes. Charli explores the different flavours and textures of some imaginary food. Nathan helps Tim pack a healthy lunch by adding Greek foods of different shapes. Charli prepares a Greek salad for lunch. Farmer Tim makes some homemade maple syrup in Canada using the sap from a maple tree. Charli pretends to be a tap dancing crow. Sun cuts a Korean rainbow cake into pieces to share with the rest of Hi-5. Charli dances with rainbow coloured pom poms. Sharing Stories: Sun tells a story about a silly family (Kellie, Nathan, and Tim) who try and have the silliest day possible for one of the family's (Charli) birthdays.
350	5	"Environment / Animals"	Around the World	World	15 June 2007
Toucan Nathan tries to remember the important job he has to do. Charli hops like a bilby and a wallaby. Kellie tries to guess which animals Chats is dressing up as in a series of word puzzles. Charli pretends to be a rock lobster. Tim becomes a whale watcher, recording the sounds of whale calls with an underwater microphone. Charli pretends to be a little fish and a big fish. Sun pretends to be a zebra living in the African savannah, before Jup Jup changes the backdrop to an Arctic habitat. Charli pretends to be a brown bear stretching in the woods. Sharing Stories: Charli tells a story about three explorers (Kellie, Nathan, and Sun) who all set out to find different rare birds, before realising that they are all searching for the same specimen (Tim).
351	6	"Food"	Happy Today	Happy	18 June 2007
Kellie helps Chats write a jingle to advertise her homemade health drink. Charli tastes Chats's health drink which gives her energy to move. Sun makes sushi rolls by following a recipe. Charli does a traditional Japanese fan dance while wearing a kimono. Tim the sea otter uses rhythm to break open shells and eat the clams inside. Nathan sets up his café for lunch by preparing tables and chairs for his Hi-5 friends to sit at. Charli uses a tablecloth to transform into different people. Sharing Stories: Nathan tells a story about three buskers (Tim, Kellie, and Sun) who get in each other's way at a spot outside a café before they combine their acts, and are invited inside by the café's owner (Charli).
352	7	"Move Your Body"	Happy Today	Happy	19 June 2007
Nathan builds an exercise circuit with equipment to make his workouts more exciting. Charli uses a broomstick to pretend to be a weightlifter. Sun invents a game to play inside on a rainy day using a balloon and scarves. Charli juggles with three silk scarves. Tim rehearses playing all of the percussion instruments in an orchestra at once, giving himself a workout in the process. Charli pretends to be the drummer of a marching band but struggles to keep in time. Kellie and Chats come up with some energetic new names for her animal aerobic exercises. Charli turns her arm into an energetic goose. Sharing Stories: Charli tells a story about three Western cowhands (Nathan, Sun, and Tim) who enter a lasso contest at a rodeo without any experience, and learn the skill from a more seasoned cowgirl (Kellie).
353	8	"Routines"	Happy Today	Happy	20 June 2007
Nathan reprises his television game show What's That Action?, with Kellie and Tim competing to identify pictures of daily routines. Charli pretends to brush her teeth. Sun uses her handprints to paint a colourful picture, before washing her hands in soapy water. Charli practises dancing the waltz with a life-size doll. Tim warms up his voice and his body before making music. Charli pretends to be an opera singer warming up with vocal exercises before a performance. Kellie tries to help Chats fall asleep by getting her to count shooting stars. Charli pretends to be a star in the night sky, leaving behind a trail of stardust. Sharing Stories: Kellie tells a story about three workers at a carwash (Charli, Sun, and Nathan) who are forced to change their routine when a horse (Tim) arrives and requests a clean.
354	9	"What Makes Me Happy"	Happy Today	Happy	21 June 2007
Kellie tests out Chats's happiness machine and tries not to laugh at her silly instructions. Charli performs a song with each of her finger faces representing a different feeling. Nathan dresses up as a cowboy to sing a country karaoke song. Charli does a country-style cowgirl dance while twirling a ribbon lasso. Tim plays his guitar to feel happy and imagines playing his electric guitar at a rock concert. Charli plays the drums. Sun makes a happy face using fruit. Charli moves her eyes and looks in different directions. Sharing Stories: Sun makes up a story about a pet show, where a puppy (Kellie) loses her squeaky toy and asks the other animals at the show (Tim, Nathan, and Charli) to help her find it.
355	10	"Community Carers"	Happy Today	Happy	22 June 2007
Sun works as an animal dentist, teaching her patients how to clean their teeth. Charli pretends to be a tooth fairy cleaning the teeth of different animals. Nathan becomes a council worker and cleans up a local park with a street sweeper. Charli pretends to be a street sweeper tidying up the roads. Kellie tries to find a different way to deliver meals on wheels to those in need. Charli discovers a creative way to carry a heavy load of items to her grandmother's house. Tim helps his sad double bass friend get his groove back by inviting some other instruments to play jazz music with them. Charli dresses up as a jazz-singing scat cat. Sharing Stories: Tim tells a story about a caring superhero (Nathan) who helps three hungry aliens (Charli, Sun, and Kellie) find some round food to eat.
356	11	"Body Language"	Stop and Go	Communicate	25 June 2007
Kellie spells the word "face" by using her body to make the letter shapes while stretching. Charli plays a game, acting out different emotions according to the faces on a mat. Nathan the French fashion designer returns to create a new dress for Kellie, and wonders how she will respond. Charli dresses up in all of her favourite clothes. Tim makes up a musical story on his guitar, with Charli acting out the adventure using her body. Charli paddles down the Congo River in a pretend boat. Sun works as a lollipop lady at a pedestrian crossing, using signs to control the traffic and help people cross the road. Charli pretends to be an Irish dancing lollipop. Sharing Stories: Tim tells a story about three pigs (Charli, Sun, and Nathan) learning ballet, whose teacher (Kellie) uses body language to direct them during their performance.
357	12	"Ways of Saying"	Stop and Go	Communicate	26 June 2007
Nathan becomes a weather correspondent and reports the conditions for the week using symbols. Charli goes surfing and tries to balance on her board while doing tricks. Sun makes up a song and dance as a special way of saying "I love you" to her favourite people. Charli gives her old teddy bear some tender loving care. Tim writes a song about sport and uses percussion instruments to replicate the sounds of the games. Charli practises her gymnastics by walking across a balance beam. Kellie tries to find a way to apologise to Chats after they have an argument, while Chats tries to say sorry as well. Charli thinks of a way to thank Tim for a present. Sharing Stories: Charli tells a story about a group of silly knights (Tim, Kellie, and Sun) who try to sneak into the castle of a lonely count (Nathan), but are prevented by their own knobbly knees.
358	13	"Technology"	Stop and Go	Communicate	27 June 2007
Sun imagines travelling to Jupland after using technology to send a message in outer space. Charli explores different modes of communication after writing a letter. Kellie uses Chats's mind reading machine to discover something that Chats wants her to do. Charli pretends to be a futuristic dancing robot. Tim listens to different genres of music on his MP3 player and moves to the songs in different ways. Charli moves like a butterfly while listening to calming music, before moving like a rhino to a more powerful song. Nathan receives shape messages on his computer, and tries to work out who has sent them and what they mean. Charli pretends to be a telephone operator taking messages for Hi-5. Sharing Stories: Sun tells a story about a kettle (Kellie) and a toaster (Tim) living in a kitchen, who meet a stereo (Nathan) and a vacuum cleaner (Charli) after they hear strange new sounds coming from the living room.
359	14	"Animals"	Stop and Go	Communicate	28 June 2007
Nathan dresses up as a lion and builds a den to rest inside. Charli practises the lion and cat yoga stretches. Sun creates a way for gorillas to talk and communicate with each other. Charli performs a high energy song and dance number about bananas. Tim the dog and his friends rehearse a cheer for an upcoming cat and dog running race. Charli tries to train her dog (Nathan) and teach him how to follow directions. Kellie is given a high pitched whistle from Chats, which she uses to try and call a dog. Sharing Stories: Nathan tells a story about a group of jellyfish (Charli, Tim, and Kellie) who try to help a young jellyfish (Sun) face her fears of floating in the ocean, by encouraging her to go with the flow.
360	15	"The Arts"	Stop and Go	Communicate	29 June 2007
Sun makes a butterfly mobile for her mother as a way of saying thank you. Charli pretends to be a majestic pelican. Nathan sets up sculptures for an art exhibition and tries to interpret what is being conveyed in each piece. Tim communicates music in a visual mode when he paints on an easel that matches his patterns with musical notes. Charli moves her body up and down at different speeds. Kellie freezes in several statue shapes and asks Chats to guess what pose she is acting out. Charli pretends to be a ballet dancer from a painting, stepping out of the frame and coming to life. Sharing Stories: Kellie tells a story about a pirate called Captain Puffy Pants (Tim), whose pants lose their puffiness in the laundry, leading him and his crew (Nathan and Charli) to struggle in a race against Captain High Note (Sun).
361	16	"Creatures and Things in Nature"	Wow!	Amazing	2 July 2007
Kellie and Chats imagine being sea creatures using the hot water vents at the bottom of the ocean to shower. Charli the plumber attempts to fix a leaking tap. Nathan builds a snowy mountain range and climbs the tallest mountain. Charli pretends to be a sure-footed mountain goat scaling a steep slope. Tim the howler monkey holds auditions to see which animals will join the amazing Amazon rainforest choir. Charli pretends to be a sleepy sloth in the Amazon rainforest. Sun makes snowflake shapes by folding and cutting sheets of white paper. Charli tries to catch snowflakes in a jar. Sharing Stories: Kellie tells a story about a grumpy troll (Sun) living under a broken bridge, who uses her magic to stop three friends (Nathan, Tim, and Charli) from crossing her wooden overpass.
362	17	"People"	Wow!	Amazing	3 July 2007
Kellie and Chats imagine that their ancestors, a blacksmith and a prospector, were friends who mined for gold together. Charli pretends to pan and dig for gold by miming the actions. Tim yodels at the top of a mountain in the Swiss Alps to send a message to his cousin. Charli attempts to knit a scarf using a knitting needle and wool. Nathan works as a bus driver in the country, taking his animal passengers on a tour of the scenery. Charli pumps the tyres of her bicycle before going for a ride. Sun becomes a window cleaner and tries to find out who has been leaving muddy handprints. Charli works at a car wash and cleans a car using pom poms and streamers. Sharing Stories: Nathan tells a story about a girl (Sun) and her grandmother (Kellie), who travel to the water park to watch a seal show, where the trainer (Charli) struggles to encourage the seal (Tim) to perform its tricks.
363	18	"Ideas and Imagination"	Wow!	Amazing	4 July 2007
Sun decorates a pair of plain white shoes and makes them look amazing with the help of Jup Jup. Charli walks on stilts. Nathan goes fishing on a pretend pier which he builds using blocks and a plank. Charli goes fishing for prawns at night with a net and a torch. Tim plays a theremin which transports his imagination to a dark cave. Charli makes cave music using tapping sticks. Kellie completes a sensory obstacle course while blindfolded, by carefully listening to Chats's instructions. Charli pretends to be a lifeguard, monitoring swimmers at the beach. Sharing Stories: Sun tells a story about a girl (Charli) who loses her favourite bed pillow, and dreams of meeting the jungle animals (Nathan, Tim, and Kellie) from the pillow's design.
364	19	"Places and Buildings"	Wow!	Amazing	5 July 2007
Sun goes on a climbing adventure up a bridge, and meets the maintenance crew along the way. Charli and Sun use their bodies to make bridge shapes spanning across a river. Kellie pretends to be the engineer of an Egyptian pyramid while Chats, the pharaoh queen, fills it with precious possessions. Charli pretends to be a stiff peg person. Tim attends a lesson at a magical music school, where he practises playing three different instruments. Charli dances the tango while playing a tambourine. Nathan builds a rocketship and travels to the Moon, where he discovers a Moon rock while exploring the surface. Charli pretends she is standing on the Sun, and jumps around to avoid the heat. Sharing Stories: Tim makes up a story about a magical wizard (Nathan) living in a tower, who accidentally uses a spell on his friends (Charli, Sun, and Kellie) when they come to visit.
365	20	"Bodies"	Wow!	Amazing	6 July 2007
Tim searches for creatures in the garden that make humming sounds. Charli decorates her tap shoes with flower creatures and performs a tapping dance. Kellie and Chats try to guess the identity of a mystery animal inside a box which uses its body to make sounds. Charli pretends to be a stick insect hiding on the branch of a tree. Sun runs an animal x-ray centre and tries to match the correct animal to their skeleton shape. Charli the fruit bat wakes up from a long sleep and searches for fruit to eat. Nathan turns his space into a world of balloons, full of different balloon creatures and animals. Charli performs a ballet dance while holding a balloon. Sharing Stories: Charli tells a story about two sheep (Kellie and Sun) who get their wool shorn by the farmer (Tim), and a third sheep (Nathan) who prefers his fluffy coat and tries to avoid having a haircut.
366	21	"Old Places"	Time Machine	Old and New	9 July 2007
Ranger Nathan places signs next to trees and plants in the tropical rainforest, but mixes up the labels. Charli pretends to be a spiky cactus in the desert. Kellie helps Chats find something from her old box that she left behind when she moved out. Charli becomes a venus flytrap that has accidentally stuck its hands together. Tim the drumming dinosaur creates a beat with his friends in the old cycad forest. Charli dances with a marionette puppet dinosaur. Sun builds a castle and pretends to be a princess living in medieval times. Charli performs a cheer for dragons. Sharing Stories: Nathan tells a story about a royal family (Tim, Charli, and Sun) living in an old stone castle, who have their crowns stolen by a mischievous squirrel (Kellie).
367	22	"People and Animals"	Time Machine	Old and New	10 July 2007
Nathan prepares different ball games to play on a family picnic. Charli plays a game of fetch with Tim's dog Jock. Kellie and Chats imagine living in prehistoric times and talking like cave people. Charli moves like a woolly mammoth. Tim becomes a doctor using music as medicine to ensure plants stay happy and healthy. Doctor Charli gives herself a dose of movement medicine to keep active. Sun counts and waters her African violet flowers, while Jup Jup gives her an idea of a way to maintain them. Charli grows a sunflower puppet in a pot. Sharing Stories: Kellie tells a story about a young dinosaur (Nathan) who learns to use the toilet with the help of a friend (Charli) and his parents (Tim and Sun).
368	23	"New Cities and Inventions"	Time Machine	Old and New	11 July 2007
Sun imagines using a magic elevator to travel to different levels of a shopping centre. Charli arrives at a level of a building made for jumping. Nathan invents a flying fox pulley system, which he uses to send messages to Tim. Charli practises her sporting actions with a hockey stick and a baseball bat. Scientist Tim uses a machine which finds rhyming words, to help him write a song. Charli the scientist mixes food colouring in her laboratory. Kellie and Chats invent a special language for their own pretend city, and name the streets after themselves. Charli gets around an imaginary town with a groovy walk. Sharing Stories: Chats tells the story of how the Hi-5-mobile was invented, when Tim, Sun, Charli, Kellie, and Nathan all adjust the form of transport to serve as a car, a boat, and a plane.
369	24	"Treasures"	Time Machine	Old and New	12 July 2007
Sun digs and searches for treasure using picture messages on stones, like in Ancient Egypt. Charli puts on hats for different jobs and performs the associated action of each occupation. Nathan the Scottish laird tries to remember how to perform his award-winning Highland Fling dance. Charli dances in a pair of clogs from Holland. Tim imagines being a court musician of medieval time, playing music on a lute for the queen. Queen Charli dances in the court with her royal dance partner. Kellie and Chats dress up as a pirate and a parrot and go hunting for hidden treasure using rhyming clues. Charli the pirate parrot searches for a treasure chest. Sharing Stories: Charli makes up a story about a sailor at sea (Tim) who has trouble getting to sleep, and discovers three singing merfolk (Nathan, Sun, and Kellie) who sing a song to put him to sleep.
370	25	"Ways of Recording Experience"	Time Machine	Old and New	13 July 2007
Nathan colours portraits of his Hi-5 friends, and adds frames to each of the pictures. Charli practises skipping with a rope to the rhythm of a rhyme. Kellie adds labels to jars which Chats has used to capture and collect smells that elicit her important memories. Charli wears a pretend giant nose. Tim produces sound effects to complement the actions featured in his silent black and white movie. Charli moves like Charlie Chaplin, an actor from old silent films. Sun cooks a gnocchi dish using an old family recipe, before Jup Jup adds his own elements to the meal. Charli wobbles like spaghetti. Sharing Stories: Sun tells a story about two children (Charli and Tim) who discover a photo album while cleaning up the house with their parents (Nathan and Kellie).
371	26	"Different Ways to Be Brave"	Strong and Brave	Brave and Strong	16 July 2007
Kellie helps Chats feel brave during a thunderstorm: by pretending to be scared as well. Charli does a powerful storm dance. Nathan, prince of knights, journeys to the forest to collect flowers for his sick dragon friend. Charli follows a path of flower petals on the ground. Tim the elephant finds quiet musical instruments to play for a younger elephant he is babysitting. Charli drives a big imaginary truck, and a smaller sized bicycle. Sun tries to be brave when getting ready for bed: by counting her fears away. Charli moves around the stars and moon of a pretend night sky. Sharing Stories: Kellie tells a story about two siblings (Sun and Tim), who make the most of their unintended trip to the snow when they meet two penguins (Charli and Nathan).
372	27	"First Steps (Give it a Go)"	Strong and Brave	Brave and Strong	17 July 2007
Sun attempts to cross a set of monkey bars and beat her swinging record. Charli swings around like a monkey. Nathan completes a web-like maze by moving over, under, and through. Charli pretends to be a spider looking for a new place to live. Tim the hedgehog wakes up from hibernation and tries to adjust to springtime. Charli the sleepy slater stretches and moves around. Kellie builds Chats a spaceship to help her travel on an imaginary adventure to Saturn, like an astronaut. Charli pretends to be Saturn, spinning around in space with hula hoop rings. Sharing Stories: Charli tells a story about a noblewoman (Kellie) who commissions a royal portrait of herself and views three different options painted by the people of the land (Nathan, Tim, and Sun).
373	28	"Adventure"	Strong and Brave	Brave and Strong	18 July 2007
Nathan explores the Northern Territory when he canoes through Kakadu and drives to Uluru in a jeep. Charli pretends to be a mud crab. Sun uses an anemometer to determine the speed of the wind, while sailing around the imaginary Long Sock Bay in search of a mythical fish. Charli slides around in slippers. Tim travels from the country to the city and writes a song featuring sounds from both environments. Farmer Charli wakes up early to complete all of the jobs on the farm. Kellie journeys to Chats's place for a game of hide and seek. Charli pretends to be a bubble fish. Sharing Stories: Nathan tells a story about a bushland koala (Charli) who dares to climb up a gum tree like her mother (Sun), and meets two other brave creatures (Kellie and Tim) as she passes each branch.
374	29	"Imagine You Can Do It"	Strong and Brave	Brave and Strong	19 July 2007
Sun the animal doctor helps her patients feel brave by having them imagine things that make them happy. Charli has a clumsy day full of tumbles and mishaps. Kellie imagines visiting Chats's weightlifting gym for the strength needed to lift a heavy pot plant. Charli pretends to be a strong sumo wrestler from Japan. Tim imagines driving a racing car to help him sing a very fast song. Charli waves the flags at the starting line of an imaginary race track. Nathan tries to create the biggest sponge painting in the world. Charli paints using her fingers and hands. Sharing Stories: Tim tells a story about two square-shaped robots (Charli and Kellie) and a pair of round creatures (Nathan and Sun), who all try to imagine what it would feel like to be the other shape.
375	30	"Circus"	Strong and Brave	Brave and Strong	20 July 2007
Nathan transforms his space into a big top, and decides on an act to perform in the circus ring. Charli performs a clowning act with a mop. Kellie practises walking across a tightrope for her circus act, while Chats acts as the ringmaster. Charli gives herself a balancing challenge. Sun becomes a circus acrobat and works on her ring dive trick, before Jup Jup changes the size of the hoop. Charli has a go at plate spinning. Tim hosts the Hi-5 circus parade, presenting the acts as he plays the music for the show. Charli and the rest of Hi-5 perform a balancing act together. Sharing Stories: Sun tells a story about a magic show presented by an owl (Tim), starring two fairies (Charli and Kellie) and an elf (Nathan) who perform individual tricks, before being encouraged to combine their skills.
376	31	"Changing Looks"	Switching	Switching	23 July 2007
Nathan rearranges his bedroom and turns it into an indoor sports ground. Charli uses her fingers to play a game of miniature soccer. Sun turns a cake into a castle by changing its shape and decorating it. Charli navigates a boat, hoisting the sail and catching the wind at sea. Tim switches his guitar for a banjo to play a bluegrass song. Charli plays a country song on the washboard while Tim plays the spoons. Kellie pretends to be an outrider from the olden days, collecting words that start with Q while accompanying Chats as she rides in a carriage. Charli pretends to be a quirky queen who likes the letter Q. Sharing Stories: Sun tells a story about a hairdresser (Nathan) who gives new and different hairstyles to three friends (Kellie, Charli, and Tim), before switching their new looks around.
377	32	"Animals and Nature"	Switching	Switching	24 July 2007
Tim the squirrel prepares to perform a traditional Morris dance to welcome the first day of spring. Charli dances with two acorn puppets. Sun uses stamps to paint leaves on a cardboard tree with different colours for each season. Charli dresses up as a cherry blossom for a springtime dance. Nathan imagines being a giraffe and a hippopotamus, trying to keep cool on a hot African day. Charli walks around the African savannah with a pretend giraffe. Kellie tries to figure out which animal Chats has chosen to keep as a pet. Charli pretends to be a rock putting on a rock music concert. Sharing Stories: Tim tells a story about a group of busy bugs (Charli, Kellie, and Sun) who are conflicted when a butterfly (Nathan) asks to join their club, believing he doesn't work as hard as them.
378	33	"Energy"	Switching	Switching	25 July 2007
Sun burns off energy by practising taekwondo, with Jup Jup helping her use a punching bag to create a combination. Charli performs some slow tai chi stretches. Nathan works out a way to switch between cleaning tasks that require low and high levels of energy. Charli pretends to be a shrimp cleaning a mess on the ocean floor. Tim gives Nathan a musical challenge while counting to the beat of a metronome. Charli trots like a horse to the beat of a metronome. Kellie and Chats get energised by using sports language to talk about basketball. Charli plays a game of bin basketball with the paper recycling. Sharing Stories: Kellie tells a story about a family of guinea pigs (Charli, Tim, and Nathan) who discover a new way to exercise when their owner (Sun) removes the equipment from their hutch to clean it.
379	34	"Moving Places / Houses"	Switching	Switching	26 July 2007
Kellie works as a travel agent and helps Chats decide on a sunny place to visit for a holiday. Charli has a relaxing holiday on a hammock. Nathan builds a holiday home for people on the move, and transforms it into a house boat. Charli tests out a new game with a hula hoop, to play on holidays. Tim helps Hi-5 transport their instruments to a concert by becoming a removalist and packing their gear into a moving van. Charli pretends to be a removalist lifting heavy boxes onto a trolley. Sun tries think of a way to carry all of her things out into the garden for the day. Charli pretends to be a spinning garden sprinkler. Sharing Stories: Charli tells a story about a woodland elf (Tim) who decides to move to the mountains, where a goat (Nathan) and goatherd (Sun) help him build a shack, before he plants a tree for a neighbouring eagle (Kellie).
380	35	"Try it a Different Way"	Switching	Switching	27 July 2007
Kellie and Chats invent a new way of saying hello. Charli imagines that her two feet are meeting for the first time. Sun sorts her toys by their size, before categorising them in different ways. Charli transforms three coloured boxes into different forms of transport. Tim and the rest of Hi-5 use their voices to perform a beatboxing song. Charli does some hip hop dance moves. Doctor Nathan fixes broken shapes by looking at them in a different way. Charli uses her body to make different shapes. Sharing Stories: Nathan makes up a story about a superhero (Kellie) who wears a pillow over her head, and tries to rescue three civilians (Sun, Tim, and Charli) stuck in a traffic jam, but mishears everything they say.
381	36	"Indoors / Outdoors"	Love All Around	Look Around	30 July 2007
Nathan does some gardening as the morning sun rises, and discovers a group of gnomes. Charli dances while wearing garden gnome gloves on her fingers. Kellie takes Chats on a bush camping trip and tries to help her feel more at home in the open outdoors. Charli jumps around in a sleeping bag. Tim experiments with sounds on his keyboard to write a song for a star-themed party. Charli does some disco dance moves. Sun searches for a kookaburra in the backyard while Jup Jup leads her to find a nest of birds. Charli pretends to be a stilt bird standing on its long legs. Sharing Stories: Sun tells a story about three ants (Kellie, Charli, and Nathan) who struggle to march in a straight line, until they ask an old wind-up toy (Tim) to march with them as their leader.
382	37	"Under the Surface"	Love All Around	Look Around	31 July 2007
Sun creates a display of bugs and insects in the garden. Charli dances a jive for the insects in the garden. Nathan conducts an experiment to determine which household items float and sink in water. Charli stretches like her origami swan, floating on a lake. Tim performs an opera while cleaning his room, to help find his lost sock. Charli searches for a missing shoe. Kellie pretends to be a tortoise when Chats can't find her own pet tortoise. Charli builds an indoor cave to rest inside. Sharing Stories: Tim tells a story about a mythical creature (Charli) living under the surface of a Scottish lake, who tries to befriend three visiting scientists (Nathan, Sun, and Kellie) by playing tricks on them.
383	38	"How Does it Work?"	Love All Around	Look Around	1 August 2007
Kellie and Chats play a rhythm on a pair of bongo drums to send a jungle message. Charli listens to a drum message which tells her how to move her body. Nathan runs a fruit shake and smoothie bar, and makes some fruit shakes for Kellie by shaking the bottles. Charli physicalises a range of words which express different movements. Tim tests out his new gadget; a machine which tells the weather by playing the associated soundscapes. Charli reports the weather while moving through the changing conditions. Sun makes a round kite and decorates it as a spaceship, which ends up looking like Jup Jup. Charli plays a game of punching ball with a balloon on an elastic band. Sharing Stories: Kellie tells a story about three famous singers (Charli, Tim, and Sun) with different vocal ranges, who all lose their voices before a big performance, and recruit a friend (Nathan) to help them.
384	39	"Ways to Get Around"	Love All Around	Look Around	2 August 2007
Sun uses a snowboard to go on a pretend ride in the mountains, before adapting the board to suit adventures in different environments. Charli pretends to be a husky dog pulling a sleigh through the snow. Kellie travels across the river in a paddle steamer in order to give Chats her important deliveries. Charli goes on an adventure to deliver a letter as a postal worker. Farmer Tim learns to keep a steady working rhythm like his tractor, while repairing a fence on the farm. Charli dresses up as a scarecrow for a dance with a crow. Nathan works as a delivery person in an old village, transporting bricks across town with a horse and cart. Charli tries to choose between a heavy suitcase and a light one. Sharing Stories: Nathan tells a story about a land where the people (Charli, Tim, Sun, and Kellie) all move around by jumping, until they discover how to leap and twirl, leading them to consider changing their way of moving.
385	40	"I Wonder"	Love All Around	Look Around	3 August 2007
Nathan wears his pyjamas for the day and has an adventure inside his room. Charli wakes herself up with a super morning warm up. Sun uses different magnets to push a magnetic car along the table. Charli tries to resist the pull of a giant magnet against her metal bracelet. Tim the ostrich helps Nathan calm his nerves before singing a song to Ranger Kellie. Charli dances with an ostrich hand puppet. Kellie and Chats imagine painting the sky using different colours. Charli paints an imaginary rainbow in the sky. Sharing Stories: Charli tells a story about a peacock (Nathan) who is embarrassed by his large tail, so journeys along with his other self-conscious friends (Kellie and Tim) to ask a wise elephant (Sun) to change their special features.
386	41	"Special Days"	Party Street	Celebrating	6 August 2007
Sun arranges a colourful pattern of cakes for a "meet-your-neighbours" party. Charli plays hopscotch on a court of flowers laid out on the ground. Kellie and Chats try to decode the language of mice for a special "talk-like-a-mouse" day. Charli walks around in different ways. Tim prepares to put on a music concert while Nathan and Charli plan special shows of their own. Charli controls a grasshopper puppet for a tightrope walking performance. Nathan goes shopping at a supermarket for party food, and forms a sculpture of a creature with his purchases. Charli goes grocery shopping with a two-wheeled trolley. Sharing Stories: Tim tells a story about a group of pixies (Charli, Nathan, Kellie, and Sun) who make fairy bread for children's birthday parties, and have a mishap involving the shape of the hundreds and thousands.
387	42	"Us (You and Me)"	Party Street	Celebrating	7 August 2007
Nathan goes for a picnic in the park, and imagines what it would be like if his old teddy bear was the same size as him. Charli moves through the air on her hoop swing. Kellie and Chats remember when they met for the first time in a toy store, but both describe the events differently. Charli bounces on a pogo stick. Tim and his bee friends create harmonies with their buzzing sounds in the garden. Charli the bee does a dance to let the other bees know where the flowers with pollen are. Sun makes a friendship bracelet for Charli using a pattern of coloured beads on a string. Charli plays a game with Sun acting as her arms. Sharing Stories: Charli tells a story about a pair of twins (Kellie and Nathan) who take a dragon toy (Sun) and toy knight (Tim) outside for an adventure, where they come to life and become great friends.
388	43	"Nature"	Party Street	Celebrating	8 August 2007
Kellie imagines being Queen Neptuna, who helps Chats communicate with the ocean animals by replicating their calls. Charli, Queen Neptuna, goes for an underwater ride on a seahorse. Sun makes a snowman without using snow, using rocks to build a "rockman". Charli does a winter warm-up. Tim the grandfather frog helps his babies learn to jump as a team along to a special song. Charli plays a jumping game with an origami frog. Nathan becomes a birdwatcher, looking for rare creatures at the imaginary Kitchen Sink Swamp. Charli sings about five little ducks using finger puppets. Sharing Stories: Nathan tells a story about three children (Sun, Kellie, and Charli) who summon a genie (Tim) while working on their vegetable garden, and make a wish for fruit and vegetables to eat.
389	44	"Difference"	Party Street	Celebrating	9 August 2007
Nathan tries on shoes for different styles of dance. Charli puts on a show while wearing glittery gloves on her hands. Kellie and Chats explore the sounds that different objects make, and create their own unique names for the items. Charli listens to sounds coming from inside a box, and makes up actions to correspond with the sounds. Tim explores the rhythms of flamenco music and other Spanish dances. Charli dances to flamenco music. Sun dresses up in different clothes from Russia and Thailand and tries the traditional dances of each country. Charli pretends to be a royal guard of a palace, standing tall and still. Sharing Stories: Kellie makes up a story about a town where the villagers (Tim, Nathan, Charli, and Sun) hold a festival to celebrate feet, with various games and festivities.
390	45	"Feasts and Festivals"	Party Street	Celebrating	10 August 2007
Sun prepares her space for a visit from Kathleen and her daughter, Mikayla. Charli dresses up as a dancing teddy bear. Tim celebrates Chinese New Year with different instruments for a traditional dragon dance. Charli practises eating Chinese food with a pair of chopsticks. Nathan flies kites of different shapes to celebrate the Festival of the Winds. Charli tries to throw a set of paper planes through a hoop. Kellie and Chats fear that their model volcano might erupt when they hear a strange grumbling sound. Charli pretends to be an imaginary stomach beast. Sharing Stories: Sun tells a story about the owner of a pizza parlor (Nathan) who invites his customers (Charli, Kellie, and Tim) to help him cook their own pizzas when the chef is sick.

== Home video releases ==
Series	DVD Title	Release Date (Region 4)	Songs of the Week	Special features	Ref.
8	Travelling Circus (Note: While primarily featuring content from Series 8, this release also contains three segments from Series 9 (Episode 30, "Circus").)	DVD: 4 July 2007	Pretending Day; Are We There Yet?; Hey, What's Cooking!	—N/a	
9	Travelling Circus	DVD: 4 July 2007	Pretending Day; Are We There Yet?; Hey, What's Cooking!	—N/a	
9	Team Hi-5	DVD: 7 November 2007	Happy Today; Strong and Brave; Switching	"T.E.A.M." song	
9	Party Street	DVD: 2 April 2008	Wow!; Stop and Go; Party Street	—N/a	
9	Go Wild!	DVD: 19 June 2008	Around the World; Time Machine; Love All Around	—N/a	

== Awards and nominations ==
List of awards and nominations received by Hi-5 series 9
Award	Year	Recipient(s) and nominee(s)	Category	Result	Ref.
Asian Television Awards	2007	Hi-5	Best Children's Programme	Runner-up	
Logie Awards	2008	Hi-5	Most Outstanding Children's Program	Nominated	
