= Hi-5 series 11 =

Hi-5
- Series 11
- Starring: Lauren Brant; Casey Burgess; Fely Irvine; Tim Maddren; Stevie Nicholson
- No. of episodes: 45

Release
- Original network: Nine Network
- Original release: 31 August – 30 October 2009

Season chronology
- ← Previous; Series 10 Next → Series 12

The eleventh series of the children's television series Hi-5 aired between 31 August 2009 and 30 October 2009 on the Nine Network in Australia. The series was produced by Southern Star and Nine with Noel Price as executive producer.

This was the first series to be produced by Southern Star, taking over from Kids Like Us. It was also the first series to feature Lauren Brant, Casey Burgess, Fely Irvine, and Tim Maddren, making it the first series to not feature any of the original cast members. The new line-up was known as a "new generation" of Hi-5.

== Production ==
The Hi-5 franchise was sold by Kids Like Us (the joint company of the program's creators, Helena Harris and Posie Graeme-Evans) in March 2008, to the Nine Network and production company Southern Star. Harris and Graeme-Evans ended their involvement with the production of Hi-5, and the brand was placed under the direction of Nine and Southern Star executives, Martin Hersov and Cathy Payne. Along with the change of ownership, cast members Kellie Crawford, Nathan Foley, and Sun Park left the group in late 2008. In December, it was alleged by News.com.au's Confidential reporter that Crawford and Foley had been asked to leave, and that the company were "opting to recruit younger, cheaper performers." However, Park denied the industry rumours.

The new members of Hi-5, Lauren Brant, Fely Irvine, and Tim Maddren, were revealed in February 2009 after auditioning in late 2008 and beginning work in January. The trio joined established members Stevie Nicholson and Casey Burgess to form the "new generation" of the group. Along with the cast announcement, Nine committed to five new series featuring the new generation group, which would air through to 2013. However, only three of these planned series were produced. The eleventh series began production in early 2009, becoming the first series produced under Southern Star. The Song of the Week segments were filmed at Silk Studios in Willoughby, with the rest filmed at ABC Studios.

Noel Price from Southern Star, who had over a decade of experience in children's television, was assigned as the executive producer of the new series. Of the cast change in later years, Price explained how Hi-5 was designed so that its popularity would not rely solely on the cast members' individual appeal. Despite the change of cast and production company, the series retained many of the original producers and writers. Director Jonathan Geraghty explained that the brief for the series was "to rediscover the magic and excitement" that made the series such as success in its earlier years.

The eleventh series debuted on 31 August 2009. Hersov and Payne said "we're very excited to be launching the next phase of Hi-5".

== Cast ==
=== Presenters ===
- Lauren Brant – Body Move
- Casey Burgess – Word Play
- Fely Irvine – Puzzles and Patterns
- Tim Maddren – Making Music
- Stevie Nicholson – Shapes in Space

== Episodes ==
No. overall	No. in series	Title	Song of the Week	Theme	Original release date
436	1	"On Safari"	Stop, Look, Listen	Explore	31 August 2009
Stevie pretends to be a ranger on safari, observing African animals who visit the waterhole. Lauren pretends to be a monkey swinging through the jungle trees. Casey and Chats explore the jungle in search of animals that starts with S. Lauren acts as a snake charmer, summoning her sock puppet snakes with a song. Tim studies the different birds of the Australian bush by listening to the sounds of their calls. Fit Bit Tips: Stevie and Tim learn how to ride a bicycle. Fely packs her bag in preparation for a day of surfing at the beach. Lauren practises her surfing technique on the ground. Sharing Stories: Fely tells a story about a group of scientists (Lauren, Tim, and Stevie) who set off to search for a rare chimpanzee (Casey), without realising that the ape is already following them.
437	2	"The Great Indoors - Around the House"	Stop, Look, Listen	Explore	1 September 2009
Casey and Chats use their imaginations while playing inside on a rainy day. Lauren watches through her window as it rains outside. Fely builds an indoor cubby house using chairs and a bed sheet. Lauren prepares two miniature beds for her cuddly tiger toys. Tim makes the sound of rain using cardboard boxes as a makeshift drum kit. Fit Bit Tips: Stevie and Tim learn how to scale a rock climbing wall. Stevie goes on an imaginative adventure while cleaning up his space. Lauren sweeps up some pretend fairy dust. Sharing Stories: Tim tells a story about three children (Lauren, Fely, and Stevie) who each devise a plan to help their mother (Casey) find her missing ring: by exploring around the house.
438	3	"Country / City"	Stop, Look, Listen	Explore	2 September 2009
Fely runs a feed store and prepares lunch for different animals on the farm. Lauren mixes seeds and worms to make a meal for chicks to eat. Casey and Chats follow a map of the city to find their way to the museum by bicycle. Lauren practises the motion of cycling with her legs and arms. Tim explores the city and discovers different sounds and rhythms on the streets. Fit Bit Tips: Stevie and Tim learn how to paddle a kayak. Stevie makes barnyard animal costumes with cardboard boxes and dresses up as each different creature. Lauren dresses up as a pig for a jack-in-the-box trick. Sharing Stories: Casey tells a story about an alien (Tim) who lands his spaceship on a farm, where he learns about country life from the farmers (Lauren and Stevie) and their pig (Fely).
439	4	"Space"	Stop, Look, Listen	Explore	3 September 2009
Stevie becomes a space explorer arriving on Mars to examine if the planet contains water. Lauren pretends to be a space traveller walking on the Moon. Fely the fairy returns from a trip to space and makes a map to record the stars that she saw. Lauren travels across a pretend Milky Way. Tim pretends to be a speedy repair rocket who services a slow moving space satellite. Fit Bit Tips: Stevie and Tim learn how to play tennis. Casey and Chats imagine using a radio telescope to listen to aliens talking. Lauren pretends to be a three-eyed alien practising her disco dance moves. Sharing Stories: Stevie tells a story about a girl (Casey) who wishes upon two shooting stars (Lauren and Tim) to become a star as well, leading the three to meet the Moon (Fely) while exploring the universe together.
440	5	"Under the Sea"	Stop, Look, Listen	Explore	4 September 2009
Fely explores among the coral under the sea and takes photographs of her discoveries. Lauren pretends to be a hermit crab searching for a new home. Casey and Chats travel through an underwater cave in a mini submarine and experiment with their echoes. Lauren presents a puppet show with two glowworm characters. Tim pretends to be a fiddler crab making music with a fiddle. Fit Bit Tips: Stevie and Tim learn how to climb a rope ladder. Stevie dresses up as a shark to rehearse a dance for an ocean party. Lauren dances with moves inspired by the shark. Sharing Stories: Lauren tells a story about three mermaids (Casey, Fely, and Tim) who encounter a diver (Stevie) on their journey around the reef in search of a pearl.
441	6	"Teams"	Spin Me Round	Friends	7 September 2009
Stevie spells out the phrase "go team" using his body to make the shapes of the letters. Lauren practises playing ice hockey with her teammate. Fely prepares some healthy snacks for the members of her basketball team. Lauren replicates the movements of a blender mixing a fruit smoothie. Tim pretends to be a sheep bleating a song in harmony with his friends. Fit Bit Tips: Stevie and Tim learn how to sail a boat. Casey and Chats think of a team name to best represent their special sport of gumboot throwing. Lauren wears gumboots for a boot scooting dance in the rain. Sharing Stories: Stevie tells a story about a team of elves (Fely, Tim, and Casey) playing a lacrosse-style sport, who become disheartened when their teammate (Lauren) struggles to share the ball around.
442	7	"Brothers and Sisters"	Spin Me Round	Friends	8 September 2009
Fely plays with a group of toy monkeys and arranges them into a physical family tree. Lauren pretends to be a grandmother monkey stretching after climbing a tree. Stevie finds a creative way to transport a family of different-sized cardboard tubes. Lauren dresses as a robot made of cardboard tubes. Tim pretends to be a cello attending a family reunion of the string instruments. Fit Bit Tips: Stevie and Tim learn how to use a hula hoop. Casey and Chats prepare to perform hula hoop tricks as a sister duo at their circus show. Lauren imagines she is in Hawaii for a hula dance. Sharing Stories: Casey tells a story about a monkey (Tim) who struggles to connect with his siblings (Lauren, Fely, and Stevie), until he finds that he needs their help.
443	8	"Play Together"	Spin Me Round	Friends	9 September 2009
Casey tries to convince Chats to play hockey, ping pong, and softball, but finds out that Chats isn't in the mood to play. Lauren practises keeping a ping pong ball in the air with a paddle. Stevie challenges Casey to a guessing game involving shapes. Lauren and Tim dress up as a pair of bumbling clowns. Tim acts as a meerkat preparing to audition for a pop music singing competition with his meerkat friends. Fit Bit Tips: Stevie and Tim learn how to throw a frisbee. Fely plans a playdate for her younger cousin and prepares games to play together. Lauren skips along the way to her friend's house. Sharing Stories: Fely tells a story about four friends (Casey, Tim, Stevie, and Lauren) who try to find a way to enjoy playing together after they each dress up as different things.
444	9	"Making Friends"	Spin Me Round	Friends	10 September 2009
Stevie holds a playdate at his house and introduces himself to three new friends. Lauren crafts a row of people using paper and scissors. Casey teaches Chats how to make friends and they practise with a cardboard roll. Lauren plays with sock puppet friends on her hands and feet. Tim considers music to be his friend, and plays some melodies on his keyboard. Fit Bit Tips: Stevie and Tim learn how to long jump. Fely receives a letter from her pen pal, Jup Jup, and decides to write one back. Lauren draws a message in the sky to send away to a friend. Sharing Stories: Tim tells a story about an energetic puppy (Stevie) who struggles to befriends a bird (Fely) and a squirrel (Lauren), before seeking help from another friend (Casey).
445	10	"Animal Friends"	Spin Me Round	Friends	11 September 2009
Fely looks after her grandmother's pet rabbit while she is on holiday and sets up a hutch for it. Lauren pretends to be a rabbit playing hopscotch. Casey finds a compost worm inside her apple and imagines taking care of it. Lauren pretends to be an apple seed growing into a tree. Tim goes camping in the backyard and plays a song on his guitar along with his dog and an owl. Fit Bit Tips: Stevie and Tim learn how to play beach cricket. Stevie turns a beanbag into a pretend pet dog and tries to teach it tricks. Lauren becomes a ringmaster and juggles three animal beanbags. Sharing Stories: Lauren tells a story about three talkative flowers (Stevie, Casey, and Fely) living in a garden, who befriend a bee (Tim) when he assists in carrying things among the group.
446	11	"Something New"	Zoo Party	Celebrate	14 September 2009
Casey and Chats decide to change their appearance and explore different colour options for their hair. Lauren uses imaginary scissors to cut and style the hair of a woolly mammoth. Stevie finds a large piece of green material and discovers the many different uses it can have. Lauren pretends to be a caterpillar transforming into a butterfly. Tim learns to play the bagpipes as a new musical instrument and practises for a performance. Fit Bit Tips: Stevie and Tim learn how to jump over a hurdle. Fely decides on a special costume to wear to a fancy dress party using her old clothes. Lauren pretends to be a floppy ragdoll. Sharing Stories: Stevie tells a story about three garden insects (Casey, Fely, and Tim) who rescue their ant friend (Lauren) from inside a flying saucer, before they discover what it really is.
447	12	"Superheroes"	Zoo Party	Celebrate	15 September 2009
Fely works as a superhero providing hats to animals out in the sun. Lauren uses a fitness ball to practise her swimming strokes. Stevie tries to determine the best actions and poses for a superhero. Lauren moves around like a superhero. Tim works as a composer and tries to write a heroic theme song for a superhero. Fit Bit Tips: Stevie and Tim learn how to play beach volleyball. Casey and Chats try to help their friends find a way to make their dream superpowers become a reality. Lauren tries to walk across a balance beam. Sharing Stories: Fely tells a story about three superheroes (Lauren, Casey, and Tim) who use their powers to help a friend (Stevie) find his missing good luck charm on the night of an award ceremony for heroes.
448	13	"Adventures"	Zoo Party	Celebrate	16 September 2009
Casey and Chats organise a list to help decide which type of adventure they should go on next. Lauren dresses up as a polar bear going on an ice skating adventure in the Arctic. Stevie uses his white bed sheets to set up an imaginary Arctic landscape. Lauren pretends to be a sea lion playing soccer on the ice. Tim acts as a steam train travelling up a mountain to reach the station at the summit. Fit Bit Tips: Stevie and Tim learn how to kick a soccer ball. Fely roleplays going on a plane voyage in order to prepare for her first flight. Lauren pretends to be a flight attendant performing the safety demonstration. Sharing Stories: Lauren tells a story about a girl (Fely) who searches for her missing teddy bear (Tim) during a picnic with her father (Stevie), while the teddy makes friends with a real bear (Casey).
449	14	"Games"	Zoo Party	Celebrate	17 September 2009
Fely invents a new board game to play with the other members of Hi-5, and tries to figure out the rules of the game. Lauren follows the directions of a life-sized board game involving physical movements. Stevie hosts a television game show which involves recognising different hand movements. Lauren performs a clapping dance with her hands. Tim acts as a lyrebird that can mimic the sounds of his different friends' unique bird calls. Fit Bit Tips: Stevie and Tim learn how to play beach cricket. Casey dresses up as a bee and looks for items that start with the letter B. Lauren pretends to be a bug who dances the jitterbug. Sharing Stories: Tim tells a story about a mouse (Casey) who has a sleepover with her friends (Stevie and Lauren), but would rather play games than be put to sleep by her grandmother (Fely).
450	15	"Why You're Special"	Zoo Party	Celebrate	18 September 2009
Casey asks Chats to help her think of ways to release her extra energy. Lauren pretends to be a horse jumping over obstacles around a track. Fely becomes a detective and decides to investigate a series of mysterious footprints in the garden. Lauren paints a colourful picture using her handprints. Tim pretends to be a panda from China searching for a suitable instrument to play with the help of a woodpecker friend. Fit Bit Tips: Stevie and Tim learn how to perform the yoga tree pose. Stevie dresses up as a hippo for a hip hop dance routine at the waterhole. Lauren pretends to be a hippo wiping the mud off her shoes with a hip hop dance. Sharing Stories: Casey tells a story about a young moose (Stevie) who is encouraged by his family (Fely, Tim, and Lauren) to embrace his special features when he expresses despair about his large antlers.
451	16	"Mysteries - Be An Investigator"	Knock, Knock, Knock	Curiosity	21 September 2009
Stevie searches for a robot among a collection of silver boxes in his space. Lauren tap dances while wearing tissue boxes on her feet. Casey and Chats try to solve the mystery of her missing soup by analysing evidence. Lauren stirs a large pot of imaginary pumpkin soup. Tim challenges Stevie and Casey to create a series of musical sounds using items from around the house. Fit Bit Tips: Stevie and Tim learn how to skip with a rope. Fely crafts a purple sock puppet while folding clothes from the washing basket. Lauren swirls a long sock around in the air. Sharing Stories: Fely tells a story about a duck (Lauren) who wonders why the sky is blue, and investigates by asking her animal friends (Tim, Stevie, and Casey).
452	17	"Inventions"	Knock, Knock, Knock	Curiosity	22 September 2009
Casey tests out Chats's new machine which creates new make-believe words with unknown meanings. Lauren goes for a walk around a city full of letters from the alphabet. Fely uses a new painting palette which separates her colours, before Jup Jup mixes up the paints. Lauren imagines floating to the sky while holding rainbow-coloured balloons. Tim pretends to be a caveman who invents the drum kit as a way to keep all of his drums together. Fit Bit Tips: Stevie and Tim learn how to ride a bicycle. Stevie tries to find shapes around his space by using a new pair of high-tech goggles. Lauren pretends to go for a swim in the ocean. Sharing Stories: Lauren tells a story about a professor (Stevie) and his robots (Tim and Fely) who invent a new robot (Casey) to make his bed for him.
453	18	"What Will I Be When I Grow Up?"	Knock, Knock, Knock	Curiosity	23 September 2009
Fely becomes a chef and prepares a trifle dessert for Hi-5. Lauren wobbles two plates of jelly while dancing. Casey gets her sore stomach checked out by Chats, who wishes to be a doctor when she grows up. Lauren demonstrates her tooth brushing routine. Tim looks at old photographs of himself and realises that his dream has always been to make music. Fit Bit Tips: Stevie and Tim learn how to play beach cricket. Stevie works as a fruitologist and tries to determine which fruits float and sink in water. Lauren tries to balance a hat of fruit on her head. Sharing Stories: Stevie tells a story about a girl (Casey) who asks her friends (Tim, Lauren, and Fely) to help think about what she could be when she grows up, leading her try out a variety of career ideas.
454	19	"Finding Treasure"	Knock, Knock, Knock	Curiosity	24 September 2009
Casey and Chats follow rhymes as clues to discover where they have hidden their time capsule. Lauren moves like a popping piece of popcorn. Stevie explores the items in his collection of wheels. Lauren moves her body like a wheel in different ways. Tim discovers a musical treasure: how to whistle, while Stevie learns to click, Casey practises her humming, and Fely claps. Fit Bit Tips: Stevie and Tim learn how to climb a rope ladder. Fely decorates a new treasure chest using her collection of precious shells. Lauren makes a necklace by threading shells on a piece of twine. Sharing Stories: Casey tells a story about three friends (Fely, Tim, and Stevie) who follow a pirate treasure map in the backyard, without realising it is actually an exercise guide belonging to their mother (Lauren).
455	20	"Human Body"	Knock, Knock, Knock	Curiosity	25 September 2009
Casey asks Chats for warm clothing items on a cold day, but Chats mishears the requests due to wearing earmuffs. Lauren bounces on a mini trampoline to keep warm. Stevie explores the skeleton bones of different types of dinosaurs in a museum. Lauren exercises the muscles in her arms and legs. Tim imagines what it would be like to be the heart, keeping the rhythm of the body. Fit Bit Tips: Stevie and Tim learn how to use a hula hoop. Fely pretends to be an optometrist for animals and finds the right pair of glasses for each of her patients. Lauren pretends to be a dog digging for a bone. Sharing Stories: Tim tells a story about four baby chicks (Fely, Casey, Lauren, and Stevie) who hatch out of their eggs and discover how to use their bodies for the first time.
456	21	"Snowy Time"	Four Seasons	Natural World	28 September 2009
Casey and Chats travel on a chairlift to get to the top of a snowy mountain. Lauren observes the movements of a caterpillar-shaped cloud in the sky. Stevie pretends to be a woolly mammoth who performs an exercise routine to warm up in the ice. Lauren moves like an emperor penguin protecting an egg. Tim pretends to be a penguin in an ice cave playing icicles like a marimba. Fit Bit Tips: Stevie and Tim learn how to paddle a kayak. Fely builds her own igloo using pretend blocks of ice in the backyard. Lauren dresses up as a snowman for a dance. Sharing Stories: Stevie tells a story about three friends (Tim, Lauren, and Fely) who visit the snowy mountains to go skiing, but discover a sad yeti (Casey) along the way.
457	22	"Summer Time"	Four Seasons	Natural World	29 September 2009
Fely turns a small paddling pool into a pond while Jup Jup adds a slippery dip. Lauren dresses up as a turtle and hides in her shell. Casey helps Chats to prepare for a day at the beach by teaching her how to slip, slop, and slap. Lauren tries to keep a beach ball up in the air. Tim meets some singing fish while surfing, and helps them keep in time with each other by conducting. Fit Bit Tips: Stevie and Tim learn how to play beach cricket. Stevie celebrates summer by dancing around in cardboard cutouts of different-shaped fruits. Lauren does a summer stretch in the morning. Sharing Stories: Lauren tells a story about a knight called Sir Buckethead (Stevie) whose page (Tim) advises him to remove his armour on a hot day, before a maiden (Fely) encourages him to remove his bucket to help a sick dragon (Casey) get a drink of water from the well.
458	23	"Rainbows"	Four Seasons	Natural World	30 September 2009
Casey finds a pot of gold and attempts to solve a riddle in order to receive the treasure inside. Lauren practises Irish dancing. Stevie works at a shop selling raindrops and helps a customer make a suitable selection. Lauren dances with a colourful ribbon. Tim pretends to be a bluebird who sings a special song to help himself and his friends feel happy. Fit Bit Tips: Stevie and Tim learn how to throw a frisbee. Fely prepares a colourful platter of fruit while Jup Jup helps her find a different way to arrange it. Lauren practises juggling with oranges and lemons. Sharing Stories: Fely tells a story about four elves and fairies (Casey, Stevie, Tim, and Lauren) who magically clean a rainbow on the first day of spring, and accidentally cause the rainbow to change its appearance.
459	24	"Changing"	Four Seasons	Natural World	1 October 2009
Stevie demonstrates how the seasons change by using a life-sized model of a tree. Lauren pretends to be a baby bird learning how to fly. Fely paints a picture which, once Jup Jup accidentally folds in half, turns into a butterfly. Lauren dances around in the cool summer breeze. Tim dresses up as a caterpillar to become the conductor of an insect orchestra, before he begins to experience metamorphosis. Fit Bit Tips: Stevie and Tim learn how to climb a rope ladder. Casey and Chats imagine being the size of an insect and stepping inside a diorama. Lauren pretends to be a grasshopper jumping around the garden. Sharing Stories: Tim tells a story about three animals (Casey, Lauren, and Fely) who become disheartened when the leaves of their favourite tree start falling off, before a wise owl (Stevie) teaches them about the seasons.
460	25	"Planet Earth"	Four Seasons	Natural World	2 October 2009
Casey assembles a stationary exercise bike which uses renewable energy to power itself. Lauren uses her body to replicate the movements of a windmill. Stevie dresses up in a costume to demonstrate how whirlwinds move across the earth in a spiralling figure. Lauren performs a ballet dance featuring circular movements. Tim imagines viewing Earth from the perspective of the sun and the moon to help write a song. Fit Bit Tips: Stevie and Tim learn how to ride a bicycle. Fely builds an eco-friendly doghouse in the garden, adding a solar panel and rainwater catchment system. Lauren makes a pattern with coloured sand to represent each of the seasons. Sharing Stories: Casey tells a story about three spaceships (Stevie, Fely, and Lauren) who compete in an outer space race around the sun (Tim).
461	26	"Christmas"	Let's Get Away	Holidays	5 October 2009
Fely hangs up her stocking and prepares a snack for Santa on Christmas Eve. Lauren decorates cardboard stockings with glitter designs. Stevie dresses up in a snowflake costume after decorating his space as a winter wonderland. Lauren pretends to be a snow goose. Tim plays a variety of bells and tries to find the most appropriate sound for Christmas. Fit Bit Tips: Stevie and Tim learn how to use a hula hoop. Casey and Chats decorate their Christmas tree with symbolic items that represent their friendship. Lauren pretends to be an angel from a Christmas tree. Sharing Stories: Casey tells a story about three elves from the North Pole (Fely, Tim, and Lauren) who work together to deliver the presents on Christmas eve when Santa (Stevie) becomes sick.
462	27	"Celebrations Around the World"	Let's Get Away	Holidays	6 October 2009
Casey and Chats perform a rain dance in the hope of summoning the rain. Lauren pretends to be a duck splashing in rain puddles. Stevie creates a banner and flags featuring symbols that represent the great things about the world. Lauren flies a Japanese carp fish kite. Tim celebrates Children's Day by playing a shamisen from Japan. Fit Bit Tips: Stevie and Tim learn how to paddle a kayak. Fely makes an Easter-themed piñata in the shape of the Easter bunny. Lauren and the rest of Hi-5 celebrate with a piñata party game. Sharing Stories: Lauren tells a story about an inventor (Tim) and his friends (Stevie, Fely, and Casey) who use his latest invention to travel to different celebrations around the world.
463	28	"Travelling"	Let's Get Away	Holidays	7 October 2009
Casey and Chats imagine travelling to different holiday locations on a magical gondola. Lauren practises using chopsticks from China. Stevie sets up a pretend tropical island for a holiday. Lauren dances to reggae music while making music with a coconut. Tim teaches Fely and Casey a song to sing while driving to make their long car trip exciting. Fit Bit Tips: Stevie and Tim learn how to run fast. Fely daydreams about dressing up like a bee. Lauren performs a maypole dance while dressed as a bee. Sharing Stories: Stevie tells a story about a famous adventurer (Fely) who meets three new animal friends (Tim, Casey, and Lauren) while travelling in unusual and interesting ways.
464	29	"Planes, Trains, and Automobiles"	Let's Get Away	Holidays	8 October 2009
Stevie uses a box for an imaginary journey around the world in a plane, train, and boat. Lauren moves her body like the spinning rotors of a helicopter. Fely transports a family of teddy bears around on a holiday in a miniature caravan. Lauren pretends to be a teddy bear going on a picnic in the forest. Tim acts as a taxi driver of a musical taxi that matches styles of music to the passengers' destinations. Fit Bit Tips: Stevie and Tim learn how to jump over a hurdle. Casey rides a spooky train at a fun fair while Chats tries to scare her along the way. Lauren tries to stop herself from laughing. Sharing Stories: Tim tells a story about a duck with a sprained wing (Lauren) who searches for a way to travel to join another duck (Fely) on an island holiday, and makes friends with a moose (Stevie) and a crocodile (Casey) along the way.
465	30	"Visiting"	Let's Get Away	Holidays	9 October 2009
Fely packs her bag for a visit to her grandmother's house, with Jup Jup's help. Lauren dresses up as a snail who carries her belongings inside her shell. Stevie pretends to be an alien that can juggle who teaches his visiting friend Tim how to juggle. Lauren becomes an alien who travels around on a space hopper. Tim invites Casey and Fely over for a karaoke party, and the trio practise their karaoke singing skills. Fit Bit Tips: Stevie and Tim learn how to skip with a rope. Casey helps Chats to hold an open garden day, so that her friends can visit her flowers and choose one to keep. Lauren uses her hands to demonstrate how seeds can grow into flowers in a garden. Sharing Stories: Fely tells a story about a guinea pig (Casey) who is looking forward to a relaxing holiday at home before she is interrupted by visits from her energetic friends (Stevie, Lauren, and Tim).
466	31	"Let's Dance!"	Happy Monster Dance	Be Active	12 October 2009
Fely completes a dance marathon and counts the total of her tap dancing steps. Lauren rehearses marching with the Hi-5 marching band. Stevie pretends to be a warthog and compares his dancing to the moves of a flamingo. Lauren balances like a flamingo. Tim pretends to be a cat making music by moving across a piano. Fit Bit Tips: Stevie and Tim learn how to perform the downward dog yoga pose. Casey and Chats share their favourite disco dance moves for a dancing party. Lauren mows the lawn with a toy lawnmower. Sharing Stories: Tim tells a story about a group of dancers (Fely, Stevie, Lauren, and Casey) who love to twirl, but struggle to dance without becoming dizzy.
467	32	"Being Sporty"	Happy Monster Dance	Be Active	13 October 2009
Stevie goes skiing on a snowy mountain and practises making shapes with his skis. Lauren goes for a cross country ski and yodels along the way. Casey trains with Chats and completes hopping, stepping, and jumping actions. Lauren pretends to be a jumping and hopping kangaroo. Tim tries to decide which sport to try out for by exploring the beats and movements of different sports. Fit Bit Tips: Stevie and Tim learn how to kick a soccer ball. Fely plays a game of golf in the backyard using numbered flags for the courses. Lauren practises her golf swing using different clubs. Sharing Stories: Stevie tells a story about a surfer (Casey) who discovers a lamp on the beach and summons a genie (Tim), but her wishes are misinterpreted and eventuate as a poodle (Lauren) and moose (Fely).
468	33	"Building"	Happy Monster Dance	Be Active	14 October 2009
Stevie acts as an Egyptian builder who discovers the best way to construct something new for the pharaoh. Lauren dresses as a pharaoh queen of Egypt and performs a dance to represent the hieroglyphics from her palace. Casey and Chats use blocks with numbers and letters printed on them to build a tower. Lauren uses her body to make the letters of the word "tower". Tim uses his equipment for washing clothes to create new musical instruments to play with the rest of Hi-5. Fit Bit Tips: Stevie and Tim learn how to play beach volleyball. Fely works as a car manufacturer who paints and decorates cars with different themes and designs. Lauren goes for a ride in a foot-powered car. Sharing Stories: Fely tells a story about a group of friends (Casey, Lauren, Tim, and Stevie), who build a cubby house in the backyard and decide to transform it into a castle.
469	34	"My Body"	Happy Monster Dance	Be Active	15 October 2009
Casey asks Chats to help energise her body when her hands and feet have fallen asleep. Lauren performs "Happy Monster Dance" while wearing monster feet. Stevie tries to find the right sports equipment and gear to play a game of cricket with Tim. Lauren practises bowling and batting for a beach cricket match. Tim pretends to be an armadillo who uses his body to make percussive music. Fit Bit Tips: Stevie and Tim learn how to play beach cricket. Fely makes a banana and berry smoothie for the rest of Hi-5 with the help of Jup Jup. Lauren dresses up as a green lollipop for an Irish dance. Sharing Stories: Casey tells a story about three elves (Tim, Lauren, and Fely) who compete in an athletics carnival, and invite a newcomer troll (Stevie) to join in with the action.
470	35	"Things to Do"	Happy Monster Dance	Be Active	16 October 2009
Casey has been horse riding and Chats helps her imagine what it would be like to ride an elephant. Lauren dresses up as an elephant and dances ballet. Stevie invents different sporty games to play with the utensils and equipment in his kitchen. Lauren plays a game of frisbee in the backyard with Stevie. Tim hosts a television game show in which contestants Fely and Casey must identify musical instruments based on their sounds. Fit Bit Tips: Stevie and Tim learn how to jump over a hurdle. Fely makes her bed and tidies her room before she goes outside to play. Lauren pretends to be a feather duster in order to clean her space. Sharing Stories: Lauren tells a story about a family of potatoes (Casey, Tim, and Stevie) who like to sit on the couch, before the youngest potato (Fely) requests that the family go for a bushwalk on her birthday.
471	36	"Mystical Creatures"	Living in a Fairytale	Imagine	19 October 2009
Stevie tries to replicate the look of a mystical creature from his dreams using dress up items from around the house. Lauren uses small buckets on strings to go walking on stilts. Casey tells Chats a fairy tale about an imaginary vacuum cleaner creature and a magical item it is searching for. Lauren pretends to be a horse who loves dressing up to fulfil different roles. Tim acts as a magician who invents floating musical notes of a high and low pitch. Fit Bit Tips: Stevie and Tim learn how to travel on a flying fox. Fely works in the garden while Jup Jup provides her with materials to build a birdbath. Lauren dresses up as a bird who splashes around in a birdbath to cool down. Sharing Stories: Tim tells a story about Nessie the Loch Ness Monster (Lauren) who leaves her lake and visits the town disguised as a child, before subsequently getting sent to school and befriending some students (Casey, Fely, and Stevie).
472	37	"Imaginary Journeys"	Living in a Fairytale	Imagine	20 October 2009
Casey and Chats holiday at the imaginary Shoosh Island, where they aren't allowed to talk, and try to communicate using hand signals. Lauren goes for a kayak in the water around an island. Stevie pretends to be a mouse and challenges himself to find a piece of cheese in the kitchen while blindfolded. Lauren dresses up as a mouse to perform some mouse exercises. Tim acts as a squirrel who travels through the woodlands as a minstrel playing on his lute and singing. Fit Bit Tips: Stevie and Tim learn how to paddle a kayak. Fely imagines being a space explorer and flying a rocket ship into outer space and landing on a strange new planet. Lauren blows and pops bubbles on the imaginary Planet Bubble. Sharing Stories: Lauren tells a story about four fish friends (Fely, Tim, Stevie, and Casey) who use water tanks to travel above the water and have a picnic on the land.
473	38	"The Future"	Living in a Fairytale	Imagine	21 October 2009
Fely plants a baby tree in the garden and imagines how it will grow in the future. Lauren plays on a car tyre swing. Casey and Chats imagine a future where everything is referred to using text message language. Lauren relays a message using sign language. Tim visits a faraway planet, where he teaches a group of aliens how to play the guitar. Fit Bit Tips: Stevie and Tim learn how to play beach volleyball. Stevie works in a showroom selling futuristic chairs of different shapes. Lauren pretends to be a space explorer travelling in a futuristic chair. Sharing Stories: Fely tells a story about an inventor (Tim) and his friends (Stevie and Casey), who travel to the future to explore how toys have changed for children (Lauren).
474	39	"Dress Ups"	Living in a Fairytale	Imagine	22 October 2009
Stevie dresses up as a nurse and gives check-ups to his teddy bear patients. Lauren pretends to be a teddy bear returning home from the hospital. Fely prepares the food for a fairy-themed picnic in the garden. Lauren dresses up as an elf for a dance. Tim invents a dressing-up machine which gives him costumes that match different musical instruments and styles. Fit Bit Tips: Stevie and Tim learn how to climb a rope ladder. Casey acts as a superhero and searches for words and signs that need fixing at a comic book store. Lauren imagines working as a traffic controller on duty in outer space. Sharing Stories: Stevie tells a story about four friends (Casey, Lauren, Fely, and Tim) who play dress-ups on a rainy day and use newspaper to construct their costumes.
475	40	"Dreams"	Living in a Fairytale	Imagine	23 October 2009
Stevie wonders what it would be like to work as a mechanic. Lauren pretends to drive a monster truck. Fely gets ready for bed while Jup Jup finds ways to help her fall asleep. Lauren dresses up as a sheep and helps her lambs to sleep. Tim daydreams about a world full of music where everyone sings. Fit Bit Tips: Stevie and Tim learn how to perform the yoga tree pose. Casey has a sleepover with Chats, who directs her while she is sleepwalking. Lauren pretends to be a fairy post officer delivering dreams to children. Sharing Stories: Casey tells a story about three superheroes (Fely, Stevie, and Tim) who set out to search for a missing rainbow (Lauren) and return it to the sky.
476	41	"Making Things / Collecting"	Favourite Teddy Bear	Favourite Things	26 October 2009
Fely decorates a rock from her collection and transforms it into a pet. Lauren dances to rock and roll music. Stevie crafts a bunch of paper flowers using different shapes. Lauren pretends to be a worm wriggling in the dirt. Tim explores a collection of music boxes and finds one featuring a miniature version of Hi-5. Fit Bit Tips: Stevie and Tim learn how to scale a rock climbing wall. Casey and Chats share and compare their collections of feathers and sticks. Lauren searches for pieces of driftwood on the sand. Sharing Stories: Tim tells a story about a mermaid (Fely) from the reef who loses her magical brush, and struggles to sing for her friends (Casey, Lauren, and Stevie) without it.
477	42	"Food"	Favourite Teddy Bear	Favourite Things	27 October 2009
Stevie tries to determine the best way to eat a watermelon. Lauren performs a dance inspired by the watermelon. Casey and Chats have a picnic in the park and fill a bread roll with smelly foods. Lauren pretends to be an ant marching in search in food. Tim prepares for a picnic at the farm and calls out for the rest of Hi-5 to see how far away they each are. Fit Bit Tips: Stevie and Tim learn how to ride a bicycle. Fely makes pita pocket bread rolls before Jup Jup changes them to small pizzas. Lauren performs a mashed potato dance. Sharing Stories: Casey tells a story about a queen (Lauren) who loves food, and challenges her royal chefs (Tim, Stevie, and Fely) to compete for the winning dish and the role of her sole royal chef.
478	43	"Colours"	Favourite Teddy Bear	Favourite Things	28 October 2009
Casey and Chats use a new invention to explore how different colours make them feel. Lauren dresses up as a chameleon that can change its colour. Stevie rehearses cheering for his friends' sports teams with a range of coloured clothes and accessories. Lauren practises netball skills. Tim plays the piano while Stevie paints a rainbow to match the music. Fit Bit Tips: Stevie and Tim learn how to long jump. Fely searches for different colours outside in the vegetable patch. Lauren performs a dance inspired by vegetables. Sharing Stories: Fely tells a story about three artists (Stevie, Tim, and Lauren) who usually paint with only one colour each, before they are approached by a controversial new artist (Casey) who only paints with white.
479	44	"Toys"	Favourite Teddy Bear	Favourite Things	29 October 2009
Stevie pretends to be a budgerigar exploring the toys in its enclosure. Lauren acts as a budgie performing circus tricks on a silk trapeze. Fely sorts out her animal figurines according to their habitat; land, air, and sea. Lauren goes fishing out on the water with her favourite fishing rod. Tim pretends to be a musical monkey in a toy store who likes to play loud music, as opposed to the other toys, who appreciate soft music. Fit Bit Tips: Stevie and Tim learn how to play tennis. Casey and Chats look through a telescope before they imagine riding on a comet and exploring the constellations. Lauren dresses up as a starfish toy. Sharing Stories: Stevie tells a story about a girl (Fely) who plays with her favourite doll (Lauren) and her grandfather's (Stevie) favourite toys: a bear (Casey) and a wizard (Tim) when she dreams that they all come to life.
480	45	"Music"	Favourite Teddy Bear	Favourite Things	30 October 2009
Stevie takes out the recycling and discovers that he can make music with the bins. Lauren practises playing an air guitar for a competition. Casey and Chats disagree about the lyrics of their favourite song, and decide to combine their versions of the words to sing together. Lauren and Tim play musical charades and try to guess the song. Tim celebrates Music Day with the rest of Hi-5, who each sing a verse about their favourite thing. Fit Bit Tips: Stevie and Tim learn how to run fast. Fely uses a garden hose to build and play a new trumpet-like musical instrument. Lauren pretends to play different instruments used in a brass band. Sharing Stories: Lauren tells a story about three inhabitants of an imaginary planet (Stevie, Fely, and Tim) who are inspired by a visitor (Casey) to create a brand new musical instrument using their surroundings.

== Home video releases ==
Series	DVD Title	Release Date (Region 4)	Songs of the Week	Ref.
11	Fun with Friends	DVD: 1 October 2009	Zoo Party; Knock, Knock, Knock; Spin Me Round	
11	Santa Claus is Coming!	DVD: 3 December 2009	Santa Claus is Coming; Living in a Fairytale; Favourite Teddy Bear; Let's Get Away	
11	Stop, Look and Listen	DVD: 7 January 2010	Stop, Look, Listen; Four Seasons; Happy Monster Dance	
11	Sharing Stories	DVD: 18 March 2010	Living in a Fairytale; Spin Me Round; Zoo Party; Knock, Knock, Knock; Favourite Teddy Bear; Four Seasons; Let's Get Away; Stop, Look, Listen; Happy Monster Dance	

== Awards and nominations ==
List of awards and nominations received by Hi-5 series 11
Award	Year	Recipient(s) and nominee(s)	Category	Result	Ref.
Asian Television Awards	2010	Hi-5	Best Children's Programme	Nominated	
Logie Awards	2010	Hi-5	Most Outstanding Children's Program	Nominated	
