= Hi-5 series 8 =

Hi-5
- Series 8
- Starring: Kellie Crawford; Kathleen de Leon Jones; Nathan Foley; Tim Harding; Charli Robinson
- No. of episodes: 45

Release
- Original network: Nine Network
- Original release: 12 June – 11 August 2006

Season chronology
- ← Previous; Series 7 Next → Series 9

The eighth series of the children's television series Hi-5 aired between 12 June 2006 and 11 August 2006 on the Nine Network in Australia. The series was produced by Kids Like Us for Nine with Helena Harris as executive producer.

This was the last series to feature Kathleen de Leon Jones as a regular cast member.

== Cast ==
=== Presenters ===
- Kellie Crawford – Word Play
- Kathleen de Leon Jones – Puzzles and Patterns
- Nathan Foley – Shapes in Space
- Tim Harding – Making Music
- Charli Robinson – Body Move

== Episodes ==
No. overall	No. in series	Title	Song of the Week	Theme	Original release date
301	1	"What If?"	Wish Upon a Star	Wondering	12 June 2006
Kellie and Chats dress up for a rainy day by using things in silly new ways. Nathan imagines a world of circles where everything is made of round shapes. Charli pretends to be a roly-poly bug who rolls and bounces. Tim becomes Wonder Tim, a superhero who helps people solve musical problems. Charli does a superhero warm-up. Kathleen dresses up as different insects with wings before creating an imaginary creature of her own. Charli pretends to be a groovy green grasshopper, jumping from flower to flower. Sharing Stories: Tim tells a story about a mermaid (Charli) and a dolphin (Kellie), who wish to have legs, and experience playing on the land with two children (Nathan and Kathleen) when their wish comes true.
302	2	"Wonderful Nature"	Wish Upon a Star	Wondering	13 June 2006
Nathan plays a game with Tim and Kellie, where he must guess which shape from nature they are acting out. Charli pretends to be a lotus flower opening up to the sun. Kathleen looks for things in her garden that have swirling and spiraling patterns. Charli and Tim pretend to be garden gnomes. Tim meets a talking tree (Kathleen) and discovers how nature can be musical. Charli becomes a tree who tickles people with her leaves. Kellie and Chats make a new volcano home for Chats's volcanic rock. Charli pretends to be an eruption of lava coming out of a volcano. Sharing Stories: Kellie tells a story about a land where the people (Charli, Kathleen, and Tim) love bananas, and are one day greeted by a visitor (Nathan) from a land of apples.
303	3	"Wonderful Creatures"	Wish Upon a Star	Wondering	14 June 2006
Tim, Nathan, and Kellie pretend to be beavers building a lodge in the river while rapping. Charli pretends to be a gorilla hanging around in the jungle. Kellie and Chats imagine floating through the sky in a boat and fishing for magical starfish. Charli pretends to be a little sea creature in a rockpool, moving with the tides. Kathleen sets up a store selling shoes for animals. Charli practises tying shoelaces on a giant pair of clown shoes. Nathan turns his space into an underwater world and explores the creatures which live under the sea. Charli dresses up as a bison and does a bison dance. Sharing Stories: Kellie tells a story about three students at a magic school (Charli, Tim, and Nathan), whose magic tricks go awry when their absent-minded teacher (Kathleen) mixes up their wands.
304	4	"Mysteries"	Wish Upon a Star	Wondering	15 June 2006
Detective Kellie sets out to solve the Mystery of the Missing Stuff, while speaking in rhyme. Charli prepares an imaginary cup of tea. Nathan tries to find out who has taken his shiny clothes, and discovers a magpie has been collecting them. Detective Charli follows a trail of hand prints around her space. Tim and the rest of Hi-5 sing a song featuring mysterious sounds that they heard on a bushwalk. Charli cuddles with a baby wombat. Kathleen makes jelly and discovers how colourful liquid can change into a wobbling solid. Charli wobbles like jelly. Sharing Stories: Nathan tells a story about a family (Kathleen, Charli, Kellie, and Tim) who love surprising each other, and plan big surprises for each other on a rainy day.
305	5	"Dreaming and Wishing"	Wish Upon a Star	Wondering	16 June 2006
Kathleen places a wishing well in the garden and wishes to meet her secret friend. Kellie imagines creating some healthy new energy snacks for her favourite karate star, Katie Cool Pants. Charli practises a karate routine. Tim discovers a magical lamp and is granted some new musical instruments. Charli uses the magic lamp to wish for new dancing shoes. Nathan decorates a large dreamcatcher to hang above his bed. Charli pretends to be a dreamcatcher, catching dreams with her hands. Sharing Stories: Kathleen tells a story about a crocodile (Nathan) who feels self conscious about losing a tooth, until his parents (Charli and Tim) tell him about the tooth fairy (Kellie), who helps him see the benefits of a lost tooth.
306	6	"Travel"	Are We There Yet?	Travelling	19 June 2006
Kathleen finds different ways to travel outside by foot. Charli walks across a tightrope. Nathan uses a sports wheelchair to practise playing wheelchair basketball. Farmer Charli transports some pumpkins using a wheelbarrow. Tim becomes a train conductor and listens to the sounds that three different trains make. Charli pretends to be a slow steam train and a faster electric train. Kellie walks on tin can stilts and imagines travelling to Stilt Land with Chats. Charli uses stilts to walk tall, and crouches down to walk small. Sharing Stories: Nathan tells a story about two friends (Tim and Kathleen) who rescue a crane (Charli) and panda (Kellie) while travelling in their dragon boat.
307	7	"Near and Far"	Are We There Yet?	Travelling	20 June 2006
Nathan rides up the mountains of China on his bike to visit the Great Wall of China. Charli performs a dance with a Chinese dragon puppet. Kathleen decorates a mask to wear at an Italian Carnivale Festival. Charli pretends to be a flying rainbow unicorn. Tim and the rest of Hi-5 make music at a bus stop while waiting for the bus to take them to a concert. Charli pretends to go for a drive in her car. Kellie shows Chats how she once used a scooter and a pogo stick to travel around the world. Charli the Egyptian Queen does an Egyptian dance. Sharing Stories: Kathleen tells a story about a rocket ship (Nathan) who embarks on a mission to rescue a lost astronaut (Charli), and meets some strange space creatures (Kellie and Tim) along the way.
308	8	"Imaginative"	Are We There Yet?	Travelling	21 June 2006
Kathleen imagines travelling inside an oversized bubble to a fantasy land made up completely of bubbles. Charli blows bubbles. Nathan becomes an aeroplane and writes a message in the sky. Charli pretends to be a firefighting helicopter putting out a bush fire. Tim goes for a slow and heavy walk after a big picnic lunch, and learns to move in a lighter way from a dragonfly (Kathleen). Charli tries to keep a buzzing fly away from her picnic. Kellie and Chats daydream of going on an underwater adventure and discovering some imaginary fish creatures. Charli uses her hands to act out a small fish and a big fish. Sharing Stories: Tim tells a story about a girl (Kathleen) who would like to be taller, but discovers the benefits of being small when she helps her family (Nathan, Charli, and Kellie) rescue their pet cat.
309	9	"New and Old Modes of Transport"	Are We There Yet?	Travelling	22 June 2006
Tim uses a time machine to explore how dance music has changed over time. Charli dances the jitterbug. Kellie shows Chats a penny-farthing bicycle from her grandfather's shed, before the pair build a bike of their own. Nathan imagines going on a river adventure, using a raft to deliver cargo to dry land, like how it was done in the past. Charli pretends to be a cork floating in the water. Kathleen becomes a grocer and uses a horse and cart to deliver groceries around town. Charli tidies up her space. Sharing Stories: Charli tells a story about a train (Tim) and two buses (Kellie and Nathan) who deliver mail in the mountains of India for the station manager (Kathleen), and one day decide that they want to try a new way of carrying out their deliveries.
310	10	"Holidays"	Are We There Yet?	Travelling	23 June 2006
Kathleen goes on a camping holiday and tries to find the best place to set up her tent. Charli jumps around in her sleeping bag to keep warm while camping. Kellie and Chats find a hermit crab in a shell at the beach, and imagine how hermit crabs find new homes. Charli presents an undersea fish parade, pretending to be a clownfish, an angelfish, and a pufferfish. Tim the musical vet attends to some sick animals patients while on holiday in the bush. Charli finds herself making animal noises when she is feeling unwell. Nathan goes on a caravan holiday and sets up for lunch with the rest of Hi-5. Sharing Stories: Kellie tells a story about four bugs (Kathleen the beetle, Charli the ant, Tim the snail, and Nathan the spider) who decide to set off and see the world, travelling together across the backyard.
311	11	"Places"	Have Some Fun	Enjoying	26 June 2006
Tim the dog sings in harmony with Kellie and Nathan in the hope that the new dog, Kathleen, will come over to their backyard and play. Charli gives a dog a wash and brush at her puppy parlor. Nathan visits the park and finds different places to hide. Charli hides behind different things in her space. Kathleen goes for a walk around Rome and visits the special buildings in the city. Charli builds an imaginary house. Kellie and Chats dance at the bus stop while waiting for a bus to take them to the beach. Charli takes her fingers for a ride on a bus. Sharing Stories: Kathleen tells a story about a girl (Charli) who dreams that she has become a toy-sized princess, watching her action doll (Kellie) and robot toy (Nathan) try to stop a dragon (Tim) from roaring.
312	12	"Things"	Have Some Fun	Enjoying	27 June 2006
Kathleen draws a smiley face in the sand at the beach. Nathan uses different pool toys to help him float while swimming. Charli practises walking in flippers at a pool party. Tim remembers the previous people who played his guitar; an Italian gondola singer and a famous folk star. Charli goes for a gondola ride, paddling through the streets of Venice. Kellie imagines her new rocking chair is a boat on the ocean, sailing with the waves. Charli goes sailing on her rocking chair boat. Sharing Stories: Charli tells a story about four crabs living on the beach (Kathleen, Kellie, Nathan, and Tim), who dare to do something new when they try surfing on driftwood.
313	13	""Being Me" Skills"	Have Some Fun	Enjoying	28 June 2006
Kellie visits Chats's home; a special place where she can be herself. Charli tries to jump in the light of a spotlight. Nathan builds different shaped houses and imagines the people who would live there. Tim sings a song about himself, with Nathan and Charli adding tapping rhythms. Charli and Nathan tap dance together. Kathleen paints her toenails, before Jup Jup changes the colour of the polish. Charli celebrates her hands by decorating them with stars and dancing with them. Sharing Stories: Tim tells a story about an eccentric talking moose (Kellie) who visits two children (Nathan and Charli) on a rainy day, and entertains them while their mother (Kathleen) carries out a special task.
314	14	"Times"	Have Some Fun	Enjoying	29 June 2006
Farmer Tim helps his rooster with a sore throat find a new sound to wake up the animals with. Charli the sheep does a wake-up dance to give herself energy for the day. Kathleen uses a cuckoo clock to help her carry out her breakfast routine, while Jup Jup sneakily changes the time on the clock. Charli pretends to be the bird from inside a cuckoo clock. Nathan sets the table for lunch with Tim. Charli plays with a beanbag. Kellie and Chats prepare for a P party, where the guests will come dressed as things beginning with P. Charli and Nathan come up with some dance moves for the P party. Sharing Stories: Kellie tells a story about a father (Tim) who tries to get his three toddler children (Charli, Kathleen, and Nathan) to behave while eating their dinner.
315	15	"Differences"	Have Some Fun	Enjoying	30 June 2006
Nathan makes his space different by building a blanket fort. Charli finds different ways to play inside a box. Kellie and Chats try something different when they swap their usual breakfasts with each other. Charli pretends to be a peppermint tea bag being dipped in a cup. Tim works at a beach ball factory and tries to repair the machine when it produces incorrect types of balls. Charli pretends to be a box-stacking robot. Ranger Kathleen works at a bird sanctuary, looking for new spaces at the park for birds to live in. Charli pretends to be an ibis bird with a long slender beak, and other birds with different shaped beaks. Sharing Stories: Nathan tells a story about a cloud (Tim) and the wind (Kellie), who argue over who should help keep a zebra by the waterhole (Kathleen) cool, before they work together and create a rainbow (Charli).
316	16	"Body"	Growing Up	Growing	3 July 2006
Nathan rediscovers his favourite old jacket which doesn't fit anymore, and tries to find a way to wear it. Charli tries on hats of different sizes to find one that fits perfectly. Kellie helps Chats find a new look by giving her unique new hairstyles to try out. Charli pretends to be a bee, a bird, and a termite, exploring the homes that they live in. Tim, Kathleen, Nathan, and Kellie practise playing different kinds of drums for a drum gathering. Charli makes music using pots and pans from the kitchen. Kathleen finds items to place on a weightlifting bar. Charli does some balancing exercises on a fitness ball. Sharing Stories: Kathleen tells a story about a lady (Charli) with long golden hair, which gets in the way of her servants (Tim, Nathan, and Kellie).
317	17	"Big and Small"	Growing Up	Growing	4 July 2006
Kathleen puts together an elephant costume for a party where she must come dressed as something big. Charli plays a game with large and small movements of her body. Kellie and Chats prepare baskets of big and small things to give to a new baby as a gift. Charli tries to wrap a teddy bear as a present. Tim hosts a game show where the contestants must use instruments to replicate the sounds of big and small animals. Charli dresses as a duck and dances some duck moves. Nathan turns his space into a giant guinea pig hutch while looking after a pet guinea pig. Charli completes an obstacle course. Sharing Stories: Charli tells a story about a king (Nathan) who decides that everything in his palace must be big, a request his cook (Tim), a jeweller (Kellie), and a carpenter (Kathleen) all adhere to.
318	18	"Animals and Plants"	Growing Up	Growing	5 July 2006
Kellie and Chats sort spotty and stripy animal toys into different groups. Charli pretends to be a tiger, using its stripes to hide among the trees. Farmer Nathan prepares a pen for a new goat at his farm, before remembering that there will be more animals arriving. Charli pretends to be a caterpillar looking for leaves to eat. Tim and Nathan the pot plants both try to grow taller, and sing higher as they grow. Charli uses her voice to sing higher and lower as she moves up and down steps. Kathleen celebrates a naming ceremony at the zoo and chooses names to give to the new baby animals. Charli does a party dance with bubbles, balloons, and streamers. Sharing Stories: Tim tells a story about three friends (Kathleen, Kellie, and Charli) who plant a magical fruit seed which grows into a giant tree, leading to a magical fruit world where they meet a friendly rabbit (Nathan).
319	19	"Building"	Growing Up	Growing	6 July 2006
Kathleen works on a building site and checks to see if her construction machinery is working efficiently. Charli pretends to be a building machine clearing a space to build a playground. Kellie and Chats build an extension for a doll's house, and try to figure out what to use the new room for. Charli prepares a shoebox bed for a toy lion to sleep in. Tim the jungle ranger matches the sounds of his animal friends with instruments for a special song and dance performance. Charli juggles with juggling sticks. Nathan builds a shed using rectangle bricks. Charli builds a triangle-shaped table by sawing and hammering wood. Sharing Stories: Kellie tells a story about a boy (Tim) who tells his animal friends (Charli, Kathleen, and Nathan) about someone special who will be arriving to live with them, leading the animals to prepare a space to welcome the newcomer.
320	20	"Age"	Growing Up	Growing	7 July 2006
Nathan finds things from his garage with wheels that he used when he was younger. Charli goes for a ride on her new roller skates. Kellie and Chats explore the different names for a eucalyptus tree as they grow. Charli pretends to be a weeping willow tree, followed by a pine tree. Tim pretends to be a grandfather frog trying to help his baby frogs sleep by singing them a lullaby. Charli hops like a frog. Kathleen weighs and measures newborns at the baby healthcare clinic. Charli looks after a cushion baby. Sharing Stories: Nathan tells a story about a grandmother (Kellie) who surprises her family (Tim, Charli, and Kathleen) on her birthday by taking them to a circus school.
321	21	"Health"	Hey, What's Cooking!	Doing	10 July 2006
Tim completes a fitness course moving at different speeds; adagio, presto, and moderato. Charli does a morning stretching routine to welcome the sun. Kellie and Chats discover animal tracks while camping in the bush, and follow the footprints to see what left them. Charli puts on different shoes for different kinds of walking. Kathleen becomes a fitness trainer and exercises at the beach while Jup Jup tries to sleep. Charli plays some games at the beach. Nathan tries to choose a vegetable costume to wear to a dress-up party. Sharing Stories: Charli tells a story about a quiet boy (Nathan) who starts to sing everything instead of speaking, leading his mother (Kathleen), neighbour (Tim), and dog (Kellie) to join in.
322	22	"Working"	Hey, What's Cooking!	Doing	11 July 2006
Nathan works as a rubbish collector on recycling day, emptying the bins into his truck. Charli pretends to be a recycling bin, waiting to be filled with plastic bottles. Kellie helps Chats become a chef, as she prepares an apricot and marshmallow roll. Tim becomes a traffic policeman, directing the cars on the road with musical horns. Charli plays a tooting song with bicycle horns. Kathleen cleans her space with a vacuum cleaner. Charli cleans a window with a sponge and a squeegee. Sharing Stories: Nathan tells a story about a fairy (Kathleen) who forgets what item she needs to light the fairy lights, and enlists her magical friends (Tim, Charli, and Kellie) to help her remember.
323	23	"Arts and Crafts"	Hey, What's Cooking!	Doing	12 July 2006
Kellie shows Chats some origami animals and makes a Japanese lantern when the lights go out. Charli pretends to be a crane bird doing an elegant dance. Nathan plays a ring toss game with two cylinder-shaped friends. Charli plays a hoop throwing game. Tim makes some music to match the sounds of a rainy day. Charli celebrates the rain with a dance of stomping, swooshing, and shaking. Kathleen makes a Hawaiian lei using frangipani flowers. Charli does a Hawaiian dance while wearing her flower lei. Sharing Stories: Kathleen tells a story about a scientist (Tim) who decides to make the world's largest paper aeroplane, with the help of his fellow scientists (Kellie, Nathan, and Charli).
324	24	"Can Do"	Hey, What's Cooking!	Doing	13 July 2006
Kathleen practises a hip hop dance routine by following the steps on a chart. Charli pretends to be a hippo dancing hip hop. Nathan uses a piece of cardboard as a sliding board to ride down a slippery slope. Charli and Kathleen go for a ride on a rollercoaster. Baby bird Tim tries to join in singing a morning song with the rest of the older birds. Charli uses bird puppets on her fingers to sing a good morning song. Kellie plays the concertina, with Chats reminding her when to stretch and squeeze. Charli pretends to be a concertina. Sharing Stories: Tim tells a story about a dragon (Kellie) who wants to be able to breathe fire like her sister (Charli), so journeys to find help from a wise dragon (Nathan) and finds a friend in a hen (Kathleen) along the way.
325	25	"Playing"	Hey, What's Cooking!	Doing	14 July 2006
Nathan plays a freeze tag game with the rest of Hi-5, called Stuck in the Mud. Charli pretends to be an armadillo digging a hole in the ground. Kellie invents a game with a spinning wheel, where she in Chats find words to rhyme with the pictures on the wheel. Charli spins around like a spinning top. Tim auditions for a mix-up band, where the instruments are played in a mixed up way. Charli decides that her best instrument is her mouth when she whistles. Kathleen practises her bowling for cricket, before Jup Jup changes the sport by swapping the ball. Charli moves and dances with an exercise ball. Sharing Stories: Kellie tells a story about four teddy bears (Charli, Nathan, Kathleen, and Tim) who go on a picnic, and try to think of a game to play using ropes.
326	26	"Multicultural"	Special	Variety	17 July 2006
Kathleen says "hello" in French and Japanese and imagines visiting Jupland, where she believes that "Jup Jup" means hello. Charli and Nathan perform a Greek dance. Post officer Kellie helps Chats prepare letters to be sent to her friends around the world. Tim uses a penny whistle and a pungi to imagine travelling to India and Ireland. Charli the snake charmer sings to a sock puppet snake. Nathan builds a hacienda, a special Mexican house. Charli does a Mexican dance to keep ants away from her picnic. Sharing Stories: Nathan tells a story about a mother duck (Kellie) who is surprised to find a platypus (Tim) hatch from one of her eggs, among her two new baby ducks (Kathleen and Charli).
327	27	"Family Groups"	Special	Variety	18 July 2006
Nathan explores how different members of his friend's family all move in different ways. Charli sells groovy glasses at a kiosk. Kathleen works as a vet giving food to different animal groups on the farm. Charli pretends to be a cow. Clown Tim tries to find a way to get his fellow clowns to sing in time with each other. Charli becomes a clown, moving around in silly ways. Kellie and Chats explore the different words used to refer to groups of animals. Charli practises her ribbon twirling and pancake flipping at the same time. Sharing Stories: Charli tells a story about a real estate agent (Nathan), who tries to find a home for an eccentric couple (Tim and Kathleen) and their pet emu (Kellie).
328	28	"Food"	Special	Variety	19 July 2006
Kathleen cooks a pasta bolognese lunch for Tim and Nathan, before Jup Jup changes the menu. Charli works as a waiter in a pretend restaurant. Nathan prepares for a morning tea feast, and uses the plates of food to create a picture of a face. Charli makes a face using play dough. Tim the coconut and his fruity friends prepare for a musical performance at the Fruit Bowl. Charli uses finger puppets to perform a fruit bowl song. Kellie and Chats take bread roll orders for the rest of Hi-5 to take to their picnic. Charli pretends to make a giant hot dog using a doona. Sharing Stories: Kathleen tells a story about a superhero (Tim) who lacks energy, and seeks advice from civilians (Kellie, Nathan, and Charli) on how to feel stronger.
329	29	"Weird is Good"	Special	Variety	20 July 2006
Kathleen the botanist visits a jungle island and explores some unusual looking trees. Astronaut Tim lands on a strange planet in search of new musical space sounds. Charli pretends to be a singing star in the night sky. Kellie dresses up with different animal parts to create a mixed-up creature for playing in the rain. Charli imagines being a combination of different animals at once, creating a bug-eyed-elephant-seal-cat. Nathan tries out new hairstyles using wigs of different shapes and colours. Charli pretends to be a hairdresser working at a salon. Sharing Stories: Tim tells a story about two children (Charli and Kathleen) who receive a present from their grandmother (Kellie), which turns out to be a robot (Nathan) who can do many things.
330	30	"Mixing"	Special	Variety	21 July 2006
Nathan becomes a French fashion designer, mixing patterns to create a new outfit for Tim. Charli mix-and-matches clothes from the dress-up box. Kellie helps Chats to feel confident in meeting new people at their book club. Charli says hello and goodbye using sign language. Tim prepares three different cake mixtures while singing a different style of music for each one. Charli stacks a tower of carrot cake layers. Kathleen has been invited to a mix-up costume party, and looks for an outfit to wear. Sharing Stories: Kellie tells a story about two siblings (Charli and Nathan) and their parents (Kathleen and Tim) who decide to paint their playroom, but end up with a very mixed-up result when they all choose different colours.
331	31	"Animals and the Natural World"	Peek-a-Boo	Finding	24 July 2006
Kathleen looks after Kellie's pet chicken, and makes a chicken of her own using a large oval ball. Charli the chicken hatches out from her egg. Nathan searches the Arctic Circle for different animals living in the ice and snow. Charli pretends to be a seal and a minke whale living in the Arctic. Kangaroo Tim finds a way to include his animal friends in his song for the bush dance. Charli plays different bush band instruments. Kellie acts out different African animals with horns, for Chats to guess. Charli shows how the sun rises in the morning and how the moon rises at night. Sharing Stories: Kellie tells a story about magical bushland creatures (Kathleen, Tim, and Charli) who try to help their echidna friend (Nathan), when his spikes seem to get in the way of their party preparation.
332	32	"How Does it Work?"	Peek-a-Boo	Finding	25 July 2006
Nathan prepares a report for the Hi-5 news by finding some headlines to share. Charli dances outside in the rain, with an umbrella and rain boots. Kellie and Chats make a clock using sand and a bucket at the beach. Charli pretends to be a large town clock. Tim invents a new instrument at his musical workshop, using cardboard tubes and a thong. Charli listens to the flip-flop sound that her thongs make. Kathleen explores the power that operates her toy helicopter's propeller. Charli pretends to be a solar powered engine. Sharing Stories: Charli tells a story about four cave people (Tim, Kathleen, Nathan, and Kellie) who try to invent a way to allow their wheelless bicycle to move along the ground.
333	33	"Exploring and Adventures"	Peek-a-Boo	Finding	26 July 2006
Kellie and Chats go on an adventure by following a map with rhyming clues. Charli plays a game with actions that rhyme. Kathleen explores the imaginary Lost Sock Bay in search of a rare and mythical "socktopus" creature. Charli pretends to be an octopus wearing eight socks on her arms. Pirate Tim and his crew set sail rowing across the ocean in search of musical treasure. Charli sends a cork dressed as a pirate on a sailing adventure. Nathan uses a swivel chair to go on an imaginary flying adventure. Charli turns two chairs into a pretend camel to ride on. Sharing Stories: Tim tells a story about a famous explorer (Kellie) who searches the jungle to find some rare gorillas (Kathleen, Charli, and Nathan) who are exceptional at hiding.
334	34	"Other Countries"	Peek-a-Boo	Finding	27 July 2006
Kathleen goes for a hike in the Swiss Alps and climbs to the peak of the mountains. Charli does a thigh slapping dance. Nathan pretends to be the laird of a Scottish castle. Charli practises a Scottish dance while Tim plays the bagpipes. Tim matches musical instruments to the country they come from. Charli dances with an Indonesian rod puppet. Kellie and Chats imagine visiting a pretend island where everything starts with "ch". Charli picks ping pongs from a ping pong tree. Sharing Stories: Nathan tells a story about a girl (Kathleen) who imagines travelling to Ancient Egypt, where she helps a pharaoh (Tim) and a camel (Kellie) build a pyramid for the queen (Charli).
335	35	"Arts and Crafts"	Peek-a-Boo	Finding	28 July 2006
Nathan makes a picture of a tree using recycled coloured paper shapes. Charli creates a picture of a butterfly by folding a painted piece of paper in half. Kellie and Chats use helmets made of papier mâché to go on a dune buggy adventure. Charli the moggie moves around in a cat-like way. Tim invents a way of making music with things he can wear. Charli does a dance with her ankles. Kathleen mixes egg whites to make a meringue mountain. Charli sings to a pretend mouse sitting in her hands. Sharing Stories: Kathleen tells a story about a Christmas beetle (Charli) who prepares for a Christmas bush dance performance, with the help of some frogs (Tim and Nathan) and a silkworm (Kellie).
336	36	"Who Will I Be?"	Pretending Day	Pretending	31 July 2006
Kathleen pretends to be a pirate searching for hidden treasure on a deserted island. Charli tries to hide a large nugget of gold. Kellie challenges Chats to guess which community person she is becoming when she wears a particular hat. Charli pretends to be a baseball player. Tim dresses up as a firefighter and pretends to extinguish a fire. Charli pretends to be a melting candle. Nathan goes on a sailing adventure in an imaginary boat. Charli moves like a sailor carrying out duties on board a ship. Sharing Stories: Charli tells a story about a boy (Nathan) who tries out a new job with a librarian (Kellie), and another at a restaurant with a chef (Tim), before meeting a friend (Kathleen) who helps him think of an idea for a job of his own.
337	37	"Performing Events"	Pretending Day	Pretending	1 August 2006
Kathleen uses dance mats to learn the steps to a routine for a big show. Charli practises a dazzling dance with a top hat and cane. Nathan puts on a pretend firework show using streamers. Charli pretends to be a party sparkler. Tim composes different music for Kellie's swan dance and Nathan's cowboy line dancing. Charli and Nathan perform a ballet dance. Kellie and Chats put on a show about a mouse, before changing the lyrics of their song to be about a moose. Charli puts on a moose show using two puppets. Sharing Stories: Charli tells a story about a magical genie (Nathan) who grants his dog (Kellie) the wish of new friends; a cat (Kathleen) and an elephant (Tim), who both take up residence inside the genie's crowded bottle.
338	38	"Where Will I Be?"	Pretending Day	Pretending	2 August 2006
Kellie and Chats imagine going butterfly watching on a bicycle in the sky. Charli pretends to be a raindrop waiting to fall from the sky. Nathan builds a replica of New York City in his space. Charli pretends to be the Statue of Liberty. Tim uses his harp to imagine travelling underwater and finding new ways to make sea music. Charli pretends to be a crocodile stretching in the sun. Kathleen pretends to be an astronaut landing on the moon. Charli pretends to be a rocket launching into space. Sharing Stories: Tim tells a story about a grub (Charli) who dreams of growing wings and flying, while she and her friends (Nathan, Kathleen, and Kellie) unknowingly begin transforming into moths.
339	39	"Puppets"	Pretending Day	Pretending	3 August 2006
Kathleen makes shadow puppets on the wall, using her hands to make shapes in the light. Charli dances with her shadow (Kellie). Nathan adds shapes to his marionette puppet's face, to show its different feelings. Charli pretends to be a puppet on a string with changing moods. Tim turns some socks into puppets, for a sock puppet sing-a-long. Charli wears her shoes on her hands to create "shoe puppets". Kellie and Chats imagine being a pair of giant sock puppets. Charli pretends to be a sock looking for her lost partner. Sharing Stories: Kathleen tells a story about a puppeteer (Nathan) whose puppets (Charli, Tim, and Kellie) grow tired of performing the same show every day, and go on a journey to the beach to try something new.
340	40	"Playing Together"	Pretending Day	Pretending	4 August 2006
When Kellie wants to pretend she's flying a hang glider and Chats wants to go canoeing, the pair end up pretending together after Chats needs rescuing. Charli tries to hold on to a bunch of balloons. Nathan becomes an attendant at a shop, selling shapes to his customers. Charli draws different pictures using a semi circle and a triangle. Tim and Nathan play a musical statues game, where they must freeze in a pose of playing an instrument. Charli plays an imaginary piano using her elbows and feet. Kathleen makes a frog using blocks, while Jup Jup builds a block creature alongside her. Charli pretends to be a wind-up robot bird toy. Sharing Stories: Nathan tells a story about a young triceratops (Kellie) with a love of dance, who reluctantly goes on an adventure to the Cycad Forest with her friends (Kathleen and Tim), where she challenges a fearsome tyrannosaurus rex (Charli) to a dance-off.
341	41	"Friends and Family"	Share Everything with You	Sharing	7 August 2006
Kathleen uses some old items to decorate gift bags to share with her friends. Charli pretends to be a party popper. Kellie and Chats share the role of princesses in their make believe story. Charli pretends to be a royal princess. Penguin Tim sings his special song to call his lost penguin friends back to him. Charli pretends to be a penguin waddling on the ice. Nathan builds a Native American wigwam as a special place for his friends. Charli does a Native American dance. Sharing Stories: Kathleen tells a story about a family of ladybugs (Charli, Tim, Kellie, and Nathan) who decide to look for a larger leaf home to move into.
342	42	"Animals"	Share Everything with You	Sharing	8 August 2006
Nathan rolls out his swag by a billabong and watches the animals that pass by. Charli pretends to be a sugar glider hiding in a gum tree. Ranger Kathleen works at an elephant reserve. Charli plays elephant soccer. Tim is joined by the rest of Hi-5 to move like a centipede in time with the music. Charli uses a string of beads as a slithering snake along the ground. Kellie and Chats look for constellations in the night sky and discover a star bunny shape. Charli pretends to be a rabbit. Sharing Stories: Tim tells a story about a terrier dog (Kellie) who uses a cardboard box in her backyard as a kennel to share with her friends (Nathan, Charli, and Kathleen).
343	43	"I've Got an Idea"	Share Everything with You	Sharing	9 August 2006
Kellie and Chats become conductors of a steam train made of boxes, and pick up passengers at different stations. Charli dances while wearing a wig of crazy rainbow-coloured hair. Kathleen uses pillows and sheets to make a cirrus cloud, cumulus cloud, and nimbus cloud. Charli finds a cosy place to snuggle into. Tim tests out a new multi-purpose musical instrument invention that looks like an animal, called a "mus-animal". Charli dances to the music of a music box. Nathan makes a tray of fruity ice cubes for Hi-5, in different shapes and colours. Charli serves some imaginary frozen yoghurt cones from a cart. Sharing Stories: Kellie tells a story about a muddled-up knight (Tim) who is summoned by the townspeople (Charli and Nathan) to rescue them from a giant chicken (Kathleen) on the loose.
344	44	"Games"	Share Everything with You	Sharing	10 August 2006
Nathan creates a hopscotch game, inventing different actions for landing on different shapes. Kellie is given a series of directions by Chats, to help her find a Snakes and Ladders board game. Charli slithers like a snake; over, under, and through obstacles in her space. Tim challenges Nathan to a musical guessing game, by feeling and listening to instruments while blindfolded. Charli plays an imaginary electric guitar. Kathleen uses recycled plastic bottles to play a skittle game. Charli turns her hand into a three-eyed alien creature. Sharing Stories: Nathan tells a story about an imaginary land of noodles, where three inhabitants (Charli, Kellie, and Tim) help their friend (Kathleen) retrieve a lost noodle toy.
345	45	"Talking and Communication"	Share Everything with You	Sharing	11 August 2006
Kellie watches Chats's television news report to see if the weather is suitable for flying a kite outside. Charli pretends to be a leaf being blown around by the wind. Nathan thinks of different things he can do and make with newspaper. Charli dresses up as a wizard with a hat and cape made of newspaper. Tim makes a musical alarm clock, and searches for the best sounds to wake someone up with. Charli pretends to be an alarm clock waking up Kellie and Kathleen. Kathleen prepares a greeting card and a package to send to a friend who lives far away. Charli makes a card for her grandfather. Sharing Stories: Charli tells a story about three royal cooks (Kellie, Nathan, and Kathleen) who try to bake a birthday cake for the prince (Tim), but have trouble communicating in the kitchen.

== Home video releases ==
Series	DVD Title	Release date (Region 4)	Songs of the Week	Ref.
8	Sharing Wishes	DVD: 1 November 2006	Share Everything with You; Special; Wish Upon a Star	
8	Have Some Fun	DVD: 21 February 2007	Have Some Fun; Peek-a-Boo; Growing Up	
8	Travelling Circus (Note: While primarily featuring content from Series 8, this release also contains three segments from Series 9 (Episode 30, "Circus").)	DVD: 4 July 2007	Pretending Day; Are We There Yet?; Hey, What's Cooking!	
9	Travelling Circus	DVD: 4 July 2007	Pretending Day; Are We There Yet?; Hey, What's Cooking!	
