= Sun Park =

South Korean singer (born 1981)

- Born: 3 January 1981 (age 45); Suwon, South Korea
- Occupation: Actress
- Years active: 2006–2010, 2016–present
- Spouse: Nathan Pezzimenti (m. 2009)
- Children: 2

Sun Park (Korean: 박선; born 3 January 1981) is a South Korean-Australian singer, actress, entertainer and former member of the children's entertainment group Hi-5 as well as the television series of the same name from 2006 to 2008.

== Career ==
Park appeared in the Brisbane and Sydney seasons of Mamma Mia!. Before her stint with Hi-5, she toured with the live act BPM - Beats Per Minute that fused funk, rock, jazz and hip hop music, and worked with the Australian band Rogue Traders, alongside Natalie Bassingthwaighte.

In 2006, she was hired as a temporary replacement for entertainer Kathleen de Leon Jones in the children's entertainment group Hi-5, and was announced as a permanent replacement in 2007 when de Leon Jones confirmed she would not be returning to the group. In December 2008, Park announced that she would be leaving Hi-5 after less than three years with the group in order to concentrate on settling down and starting a family. She also expressed that she felt she was only ever meant to be a temporary replacement for Kathleen. Park's final performance with the group was at the 2008 Carols by Candlelight.

In 2021, Park was named in the cast for ABC drama Troppo.

== Personal life ==
Park told the media in 2008 that she was going to settle down and focus on starting a family after finishing her work with Australian children's entertainment group Hi-5. In 2009 she married business development worker Nathan Pezzimenti.

== Theatre credits ==
Year	Production	Role	Venue	Dates
2016	Avenue Q	Christmas Eve	Her Majesty's Theatre, Melbourne	August 2016
2016	Avenue Q	Christmas Eve	Crown Theatre, Perth	November – December 2016
2019	Hair	The Tribe	Australian Tour (Perth, Geelong, Wyong, Wollongong, Sydney, Gold Coast)	August – October 2019

== Filmography ==
=== Film ===
Film roles
Year	Title	Role
2007	The Jammed	Rubi / Li Rong

=== Television ===
Television roles
Year	Title	Role	Notes
2007–2008	Hi-5	Presenter	Series 9–10
2017	Newton's Law	Ying Chen	1.2: "The Butterfly Effect"
2018	Romper Stomper	Julia Barca	1.6: "Anabasis"
2018	Wentworth	Cherry Li	8 episodes
2018	True Story with Hamish & Andy	Nicole	2.8: "Murray"
2018	How to Stay Married	Vanessa (Brad's date)	1.2
2018	Why Are You Like This	Dr. Lee	ABC pilot; re-aired as full series in 2021
2019	Get Krack!n	Laura	2.5
2019	Utopia	Kirsten	4.6: "Tricks of Approval"
2021	Fisk	Bobbie	1.5: "Ladies in Black"
2022	Troppo	Yoon Sun Park	
