= High five (disambiguation) =

High five is a friendly gesture in which one individual slaps another's hand.

High five (and variants such as Hi5, Hi-5, and Hi-Five) may also refer to:

== Music ==
=== Groups ===
- Hi-Five, an R&B quintet from Waco, Texas
- Hi-Five (Israeli band), a 1990s Israeli boy band
- Maori High Five, a Maori group from New Zealand
- The Hi-Fives, a rock and roll band from San Francisco, California
- Hi-5 (Australian group), an Australian children's musical group
- Hi-5 (Greek band), a Greek all-girl pop group
- Hi-5 (South African band), a South African boy band

=== Albums ===
- High Five (album), by Teen Top, 2017
- Hi-Five (album), by American group Hi-Five, 1990

=== Songs ===
- "Hi-Five" (song), a song by Superfly
- "High 5 (Rock the Catskills)", a song by Beck from Odelay
- "High Five", a 2014 song by Yuma Nakayama
- "High Fives", a song by Drake from Habibti

== Television ==
- Hi-5 (Australian TV series), the television series starring the Australian group
  - Hi-5 (American TV series), American version of the Australian series
  - Hi-5 Philippines, Philippines version of the Australian series
  - Hi-5 (British TV series), British version of the Australian series
  - Hi-5 (Indonesian TV series), 2017, Indonesian version of the Australian series
- "High Five" (Power Rangers), an episode of Mighty Morphin Power Rangers

== Other uses ==
- Hi-Five (film), a South Korean film
- High Five (Columbus), a business district in Columbus, Ohio
- High Five Interchange, a Dallas freeway interchange
- High 5s Project, an international collaboration promoting patient safety activities
- hi5, a social networking website
- Highfive (company), an American video conferencing company
- High 5 Tickets to the Arts, New York non-profit for students
- HIV (slang reference)
- High Five cells, a strain of insect cells
- High Five (novel), a novel by Janet Evanovich
- High Fives Gang, 1890s outlaws
- HiFive, a series of single board computers.
- High Five is another name for Cinch (card game)
- 'Hi Five', a 1950s compact, containing 'Misty Amber' face powder, by Max Factor

== See also ==
- Give me five
