= Music from McLeod's Daughters =

The television series McLeod's Daughters had many different songs for their closing credits which were written by Posie Graeme-Evans and Chris Harriot and performed by singer Rebecca Lavelle.

== Production ==
In 2008, Graeme-Evans tells of the songwriting process for the soundtracks.

For me, writing the songs for McLeod's has become an emotional journey into the heart of the series and the characters we've all come to love so much. I'd always thought Chris Harriott and I could use songs as a way to get under the skin of Claire, Tess, Meg, Jodi, Becky, Nick and Alex; almost like tools within an episode, the songs would give voice to what the characters were feeling but could not say. But as Chris and I have developed the songs, they've become much more to me than that: they've become a way of exploring how we all feel, the things we'd all like to say.

The music was performed primarily by Rebecca Lavelle. A few songs were performed by other artists including Abi Tucker and Doris Youanne. Three CDs, called McLeod's Daughters: Songs from the Series, were released in 2002, 2004, and 2008:

== List ==
Song title	Performer	CD	Featured in episode(s)
A Matter of Time	Rebecca Lavelle	-	
All I Ever Wanted Was Love	Rebecca Lavelle	-	97, 129, 136, 212
Alone & Afraid	Rebecca Lavelle	-	199
Am I Crazy?	Rebecca Lavelle	1	1, 6, 221
Belonging	Rebecca Lavelle	-	198
Brick & Becky’s Theme	Instrumental	-	47, 122, 145
Broken Dreams	Rebecca Lavelle	3	104, 128, 149, 216, 219
By My Side	Rebecca Lavelle	2	48, 81, 99
Charlotte's Song	Rebecca Lavelle	3	84
Common Ground	Rebecca Lavelle	1	2, 6, 9, 12, 13, 25, 33, 59, 74, 78, 110, 172, 197, 213, 215
Did I Tell You?	Rebecca Lavelle	2	67, 72, 135, 147, 166, 176, 209
Don't Give Up	Rebecca Lavelle	2	75, 106, 139, 168, 179, 193, 203, 210
Don't Judge	Rebecca Lavelle	1	3, 6, 14, 56, 130, 189, 196, 218
Drover's Run (My Heart's Home)	Rebecca Lavelle	3	178, 211, 224
Feet On The Ground	Rebecca Lavelle	-	3, 32, 54
Forever	Doris Youanne, Peter Hardy, Abi Tucker, Matt Passmore	-	222
Gentle, Gentle (Life Of Your Life)	Rebecca Lavelle	2	60, 61, 62, 83, 165
Had To Happen	Rebecca Lavelle	3	89, 93, 95, 122, 161
Heat	Rebecca Lavelle	1	8, 26, 194, 220
Hey Girl (You Got A New Life)	Rebecca Lavelle	2	70, 88, 91, 101, 109, 113, 117, 142, 157, 170, 171, 173
Hey You	Abi Tucker	-	196
Hopeless Case	Rebecca Lavelle	1	3, 11, 15, 37, 38, 39, 55, 66, 80, 87, 92, 100, 114, 116, 121
I Reach Out	Rebecca Lavelle; Naomi Starr	-	28
I Wish The Past Was Different	Rebecca Lavelle	3	134
In His Eyes	Rebecca Lavelle	2	53, 137
It Comes To This	Rebecca Lavelle	3	167
Just A Child	Rebecca Lavelle	1	24, 29, 190, 207, 212
Kate's Lullaby	Michala Banas	-	206
Life Makes A Fool Of Us	Rebecca Lavelle	-	158
Locked Away Inside My Heart	Rebecca Lavelle	3	170
Love Is Endless	Rebecca Lavelle	-	146
Love You, Hate You	Rebecca Lavelle	1	1, 8, 86, 98, 102, 119, 131, 191, 205
Matter Of Time	Rebecca Lavelle	-	11, 33
McLeod's Daughters Theme	Rebecca Lavelle	-	2-224
My Enemy, My Friend	Abi Tucker	-	196
My Heart Is Like A River	Rebecca Lavelle	1	5, 7, 31, 32, 52, 73,177, 178
Never Enough	Rebecca Lavelle	1	30, 31, 43, 115, 132, 188, 192, 202
One True Thing	Rebecca Lavelle	3	184
Our Home, Our Place	Rebecca Lavelle, Michala Banas	3	163
Room to Move	Rebecca Lavelle	-	2, 16
So Sorry	Rebecca Lavelle	-	126
Something So Strong	Rebecca Lavelle	-	96, 154
Sometimes	Rebecca Lavelle	2	79, 105, 123, 133, 144, 186, 217
Sorrow	Rebecca Lavelle	-	219
Speak My Angel	Abi Tucker	-	224
Stay	Rebecca Lavelle	-	108, 112, 140
Strip Jack Naked	Rebecca Lavelle	3	85, 94, 111, 120, 155, 185
Take The Rain Away	Rebecca Lavelle	2	45, 69, 73, 107, 138, 143, 160, 203
Tears on My Pillow	Rebecca Lavelle, Glenda Linscott	-	87
The First Touch	Rebecca Lavelle	2	50, 145, 204
The Siren's Song	Rebecca Lavelle	1	36, 40, 44, 68, 103, 124, 175, 187
The Stranger	Rebecca Lavelle	2	71, 90, 156, 174
Theme - Seasons 1-4	Rebecca Lavelle	2	2-106
Theme - Seasons 5-8	Rebecca Lavelle	3	107-224
This Perfect Day	Rebecca Lavelle	3	100
Time Turn Over	Rebecca Lavelle	3	223
Too Young (Was I Too Young)	Rebecca Lavelle	2	82, 173
Truckstop Woman	Doris Younane, Simmone Jade Mackinnon, Luke Jacobz, Gillian Alexy	-	222
Trust The Night	Rebecca Lavelle	3	178, 222
Understand Me	Rebecca Lavelle	1	4, 58, 76, 125, 153, 167, 195, 201, 206
Wake Up Gungellan	Doris Younane, Abi Tucker, Gillian Alexy	-	222
We Got It Wrong	Rebecca Lavelle	1	35, 64, 77, 127, 214
We Had No Time (The Man I Loved)	Rebecca Lavelle	3	208, 209
You Believed	Rebecca Lavelle	3	169, 223
