= List of Hi-5 episodes =

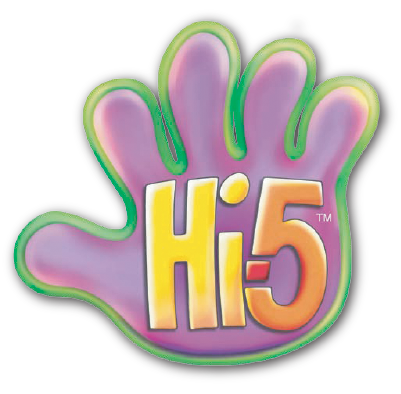

Hi-5 is an Australian children's television series, originally produced by Kids Like Us and later Southern Star for the Nine Network and created by Helena Harris and Posie Graeme-Evans. The program is known for its educational content, and for the cast of the program, who became a recognised musical group for children outside of the series, known collectively as Hi-5. It has generated discussion about what is considered appropriate television for children. The series premiered on 12 April 1999 on the Nine Network.

The series is designed for a pre-school audience, featuring five performers who educate and entertain through play, movement and music, which is an integral part of the series. The segments of the show are based on an educational model. The original cast was composed of Kellie Crawford, Kathleen de Leon Jones, Nathan Foley, Tim Harding, and Charli Robinson. This line-up had been completely phased out by the end of 2008 and were replaced with a new line-up of performers. Hi-5 received three Logie Television Awards for Most Outstanding Children's Program.

Harris and Graeme-Evans ended their involvement with the series in 2008 when the program was sold to Southern Star and the Nine Network. The final episode of Hi-5 aired on 16 December 2011 as a result of the Nine Network selling the property in 2012. A spin-off series, Hi-5 House, aired on Nick Jr. from 2013 to 2016, produced with no involvement from Nine.

Nine renewed its partnership with the Hi-5 franchise in October 2016 and announced plans to revive Hi-5 with a new cast. The revived series premiered on 9Go! on 15 May 2017.

== Series overview ==
=== Original series ===
Series	Episodes	Originally released	
Series	Episodes	First released	Last released
1	45	12 April 1999	11 June 1999
2	45	17 April 2000	16 June 2000
3	45	11 June 2001	10 August 2001
4	45	1 July 2002	30 August 2002
5	45	8 September 2003	7 November 2003
6	30	18 October 2004	26 November 2004
7	45	23 May 2005	22 July 2005
8	45	12 June 2006	11 August 2006
9	45	11 June 2007	10 August 2007
10	45	7 July 2008	5 September 2008
11	45	31 August 2009	30 October 2009
12	45	13 September 2010	12 November 2010
13	45	17 October 2011	16 December 2011

=== Revived series ===
Series	Episodes	Originally released	
Series	Episodes	First released	Last released
1	25	15 May 2017	16 June 2017

== Original series (1999–2011) ==
=== Series 1 (1999) ===
No. overall	No. in series	Title	Song of the Week	Theme	Original release date
1	1	"Fantasy"	Ready or Not	Games	12 April 1999
2	2	"Outside"	Ready or Not	Games	13 April 1999
3	3	"Rainy Days"	Ready or Not	Games	14 April 1999
4	4	"Physical"	Ready or Not	Games	15 April 1999
5	5	"Silly Day"	Ready or Not	Games	16 April 1999
6	6	"Dimensions"	You and Me	You, Me	19 April 1999
7	7	"Language, Cultures, and Countries"	You and Me	You, Me	20 April 1999
8	8	"Seasons"	You and Me	You, Me	21 April 1999
9	9	"You and Me"	You and Me	You, Me	22 April 1999
10	10	"Wonderful"	You and Me	You, Me	23 April 1999
11	11	"I Would Like to Be"	Dream On	Imagine	26 April 1999
12	12	"I Would Like to Go"	Dream On	Imagine	27 April 1999
13	13	"I Would Like to Make"	Dream On	Imagine	28 April 1999
14	14	"I Would Like to Say"	Dream On	Imagine	29 April 1999
15	15	"I Would Like to Change"	Dream On	Imagine	30 April 1999
16	16	"Favourite Things"	L.O.V.E.	Love	3 May 1999
17	17	"Pets"	L.O.V.E.	Love	4 May 1999
18	18	"Tim's Birthday"	L.O.V.E.	Love	5 May 1999
19	19	"Family"	L.O.V.E.	Love	6 May 1999
20	20	"Silly Day"	L.O.V.E.	Love	7 May 1999
21	21	"Bodies Growing"	Grow	Grow	10 May 1999
22	22	"Animals"	Grow	Grow	11 May 1999
23	23	"Building"	Grow	Grow	12 May 1999
24	24	"Plants"	Grow	Grow	13 May 1999
25	25	"Silly"	Grow	Grow	14 May 1999
26	26	"Faces"	Move Your Body	Bodies	17 May 1999
27	27	"Arms and Legs"	Move Your Body	Bodies	18 May 1999
28	28	"Inside and Outside"	Move Your Body	Bodies	19 May 1999
29	29	"Movement"	Move Your Body	Bodies	20 May 1999
30	30	"Wonderful"	Move Your Body	Bodies	21 May 1999
31	31	"The World"	Living in a Rainbow	Colours	24 May 1999
32	32	"Your World"	Living in a Rainbow	Colours	25 May 1999
33	33	"Making and Mixing"	Living in a Rainbow	Colours	26 May 1999
34	34	"Favourites and Feelings"	Living in a Rainbow	Colours	27 May 1999
35	35	"Wonderful"	Living in a Rainbow	Colours	28 May 1999
36	36	"Seeing"	Five Senses	Senses	31 May 1999
37	37	"Hearing and Talking"	Five Senses	Senses	1 June 1999
38	38	"Tasting and Smelling"	Five Senses	Senses	2 June 1999
39	39	"Touching"	Five Senses	Senses	3 June 1999
40	40	"Wonderful"	Five Senses	Senses	4 June 1999
41	41	"Outer Space"	In a Different Place	Time, Place	7 June 1999
42	42	"Habitat and Home"	In a Different Place	Time, Place	8 June 1999
43	43	"Underwater"	In a Different Place	Time, Place	9 June 1999
44	44	"Place in Time"	In a Different Place	Time, Place	10 June 1999
45	45	"Wonderful Fancy Dress Party"	In a Different Place	Time, Place	11 June 1999

=== Series 2 (2000) ===
No. overall	No. in series	Title	Song of the Week	Theme	Original release date
46	1	"To Other Countries"	North, South, East and West	Adventure	17 April 2000
47	2	"Around Your House"	North, South, East and West	Adventure	18 April 2000
48	3	"Around Your Town"	North, South, East and West	Adventure	19 April 2000
49	4	"To the Universe"	North, South, East and West	Adventure	20 April 2000
50	5	"Underground"	North, South, East and West	Adventure	21 April 2000
51	6	"Feeling Free"	Feelings	Feelings	24 April 2000
52	7	"Inside Me"	Feelings	Feelings	25 April 2000
53	8	"Feelings We Have"	Feelings	Feelings	26 April 2000
54	9	"Showing Our Feelings"	Feelings	Feelings	27 April 2000
55	10	"Animal Feelings"	Feelings	Feelings	28 April 2000
56	11	"Jungle Animals"	So Many Animals	Animals	1 May 2000
57	12	"Insects"	So Many Animals	Animals	2 May 2000
58	13	"Farm Animals"	So Many Animals	Animals	3 May 2000
59	14	"Water Animals"	So Many Animals	Animals	4 May 2000
60	15	"Australian Animals"	So Many Animals	Animals	5 May 2000
61	16	"Yesterday"	Special Days	Days	8 May 2000
62	17	"Today"	Special Days	Days	9 May 2000
63	18	"Tomorrow"	Special Days	Days	10 May 2000
64	19	"Days of the Week"	Special Days	Days	11 May 2000
65	20	"Special Days"	Special Days	Days	12 May 2000
66	21	"Imaginary Friends"	Three Wishes	Wishes	15 May 2000
67	22	"When I Grow Up"	Three Wishes	Wishes	16 May 2000
68	23	"Imaginary Places"	Three Wishes	Wishes	17 May 2000
69	24	"Daydreams"	Three Wishes	Wishes	18 May 2000
70	25	"What If?"	Three Wishes	Wishes	19 May 2000
71	26	"Our Habitat"	It's a Party	Homes	22 May 2000
72	27	"On the Ground"	It's a Party	Homes	23 May 2000
73	28	"Mobile Habitat"	It's a Party	Homes	24 May 2000
74	29	"Other Countries"	It's a Party	Homes	25 May 2000
75	30	"City and Country"	It's a Party	Homes	26 May 2000
76	31	"Looking After Myself"	Mirror, Mirror	It's Me	29 May 2000
77	32	"My Place in the Universe"	Mirror, Mirror	It's Me	30 May 2000
78	33	"My Body Inside"	Mirror, Mirror	It's Me	31 May 2000
79	34	"My Body Outside"	Mirror, Mirror	It's Me	1 June 2000
80	35	"You and Me"	Mirror, Mirror	It's Me	2 June 2000
81	36	"Machines That Carry People"	Robot Number One	Machines	5 June 2000
82	37	"Machines in the House"	Robot Number One	Machines	6 June 2000
83	38	"Machines in the Country"	Robot Number One	Machines	7 June 2000
84	39	"Machines in the City"	Robot Number One	Machines	8 June 2000
85	40	"Fun Machines"	Robot Number One	Machines	9 June 2000
86	41	"Music From Around the World"	Feel the Beat	Music	12 June 2000
87	42	"Styles of Music"	Feel the Beat	Music	13 June 2000
88	43	"Instruments"	Feel the Beat	Music	14 June 2000
89	44	"Music and Sports"	Feel the Beat	Music	15 June 2000
90	45	"Silly Music"	Feel the Beat	Music	16 June 2000

=== Series 3 (2001) ===
No. overall	No. in series	Title	Song of the Week	Theme	Original release date
91	1	"Flowers"	Rain Rain	Nature	11 June 2001
92	2	"Water"	Rain Rain	Nature	12 June 2001
93	3	"Earth"	Rain Rain	Nature	13 June 2001
94	4	"Sky"	Rain Rain	Nature	14 June 2001
95	5	"Trees"	Rain Rain	Nature	15 June 2001
96	6	"Mind and Body"	Boom Boom Beat	Get Fit	18 June 2001
97	7	"Rest and Relaxation"	Boom Boom Beat	Get Fit	19 June 2001
98	8	"Exercise"	Boom Boom Beat	Get Fit	20 June 2001
99	9	"Food"	Boom Boom Beat	Get Fit	21 June 2001
100	10	"Games and Sports"	Boom Boom Beat	Get Fit	22 June 2001
101	11	"Perspective"	Opposites Attract	Opposite	25 June 2001
102	12	"Inside and Outside"	Opposites Attract	Opposite	26 June 2001
103	13	"Size"	Opposites Attract	Opposite	27 June 2001
104	14	"Feelings"	Opposites Attract	Opposite	28 June 2001
105	15	"Movement"	Opposites Attract	Opposite	29 June 2001
106	16	"Differences and Similarities"	Friends	Friends	2 July 2001
107	17	"Sharing and Caring"	Friends	Friends	3 July 2001
108	18	"Unusual Friends"	Friends	Friends	4 July 2001
109	19	"Making New Friends"	Friends	Friends	5 July 2001
110	20	"Fun with Friends"	Friends	Friends	6 July 2001
111	21	"Someone Else"	I Can Go Anywhere	Pretend	9 July 2001
112	22	"Something Else"	I Can Go Anywhere	Pretend	10 July 2001
113	23	"Pretend to Be Animals"	I Can Go Anywhere	Pretend	11 July 2001
114	24	"Adventures"	I Can Go Anywhere	Pretend	12 July 2001
115	25	"Fantastical"	I Can Go Anywhere	Pretend	13 July 2001
116	26	"Finding Treasure"	Buried Treasure	Treasures	23 July 2001
117	27	"Collecting Treasure"	Buried Treasure	Treasures	24 July 2001
118	28	"Creating Treasure"	Buried Treasure	Treasures	25 July 2001
119	29	"Precious Treasure"	Buried Treasure	Treasures	26 July 2001
120	30	"Memories and Moments"	Buried Treasure	Treasures	27 July 2001
121	31	"Travel and Space"	Let's Get to Work	Inventions	16 July 2001
122	32	"Homes and in the Community"	Let's Get to Work	Inventions	17 July 2001
123	33	"Fun Inventions"	Let's Get to Work	Inventions	18 July 2001
124	34	"Communication"	Let's Get to Work	Inventions	19 July 2001
125	35	"Fantasy"	Let's Get to Work	Inventions	20 July 2001
126	36	"Mysteries of Nature"	I Spy	Mysteries	30 July 2001
127	37	"Detectives"	I Spy	Mysteries	31 July 2001
128	38	"Physical Mysteries"	I Spy	Mysteries	1 August 2001
129	39	"Myth and Fantasy"	I Spy	Mysteries	2 August 2001
130	40	"Fun Mysteries / The Hi-5 Mystery"	I Spy	Mysteries	3 August 2001
131	41	"People"	You're My Number One	Favourites	6 August 2001
132	42	"Favourite Animals"	You're My Number One	Favourites	7 August 2001
133	43	"Games"	You're My Number One	Favourites	8 August 2001
134	44	"Foods"	You're My Number One	Favourites	9 August 2001
135	45	"Celebrations"	You're My Number One	Favourites	10 August 2001

=== Series 4 (2002) ===
No. overall	No. in series	Title	Song of the Week	Theme	Original release date
136	1	"Garden"	Going Out	Outside	1 July 2002
137	2	"Beach"	Going Out	Outside	2 July 2002
138	3	"Outdoor Games"	Going Out	Outside	3 July 2002
139	4	"Great Outdoors"	Going Out	Outside	4 July 2002
140	5	"Outside Living"	Going Out	Outside	5 July 2002
141	6	"Hi-5 Fair"	Celebrate	Around Us	8 July 2002
142	7	"Fruits and Vegetables"	Celebrate	Around Us	9 July 2002
143	8	"Around the World and Celebrations"	Celebrate	Around Us	10 July 2002
144	9	"Dancing and Costumes"	Celebrate	Around Us	11 July 2002
145	10	"Animals"	Celebrate	Around Us	12 July 2002
146	11	"Inventions"	Give it a Go	Ideas	15 July 2002
147	12	"Imagination"	Give it a Go	Ideas	16 July 2002
148	13	"Find Any Way"	Give it a Go	Ideas	17 July 2002
149	14	"Creativity"	Give it a Go	Ideas	18 July 2002
150	15	"Adventure"	Give it a Go	Ideas	19 July 2002
151	16	"House"	Inside My Heart	Inside	22 July 2002
152	17	"Special Places"	Inside My Heart	Inside	23 July 2002
153	18	"Body"	Inside My Heart	Inside	24 July 2002
154	19	"Head"	Inside My Heart	Inside	25 July 2002
155	20	"Natural World"	Inside My Heart	Inside	26 July 2002
156	21	"Trying Something New"	One Step Forward	Can Do	29 July 2002
157	22	"Asking for Help"	One Step Forward	Can Do	30 July 2002
158	23	"In a Different Way"	One Step Forward	Can Do	31 July 2002
159	24	"I Can Do Anything"	One Step Forward	Can Do	1 August 2002
160	25	"I Can Do What I've Said"	One Step Forward	Can Do	2 August 2002
161	26	"Moves and Workout"	E-N-E-R-G-Y	Energy	5 August 2002
162	27	"Renewable Energy"	E-N-E-R-G-Y	Energy	6 August 2002
163	28	"Machines"	E-N-E-R-G-Y	Energy	7 August 2002
164	29	"House"	E-N-E-R-G-Y	Energy	8 August 2002
165	30	"Food"	E-N-E-R-G-Y	Energy	9 August 2002
166	31	"Babies"	Move It!	Patterns	12 August 2002
167	32	"Recycling"	Move It!	Patterns	13 August 2002
168	33	"Routines"	Move It!	Patterns	14 August 2002
169	34	"Nature Cycles"	Move It!	Patterns	15 August 2002
170	35	"Pictures"	Move It!	Patterns	16 August 2002
171	36	"My Special Things"	Hand in Hand	Teamwork	19 August 2002
172	37	"Games"	Hand in Hand	Teamwork	20 August 2002
173	38	"Memories"	Hand in Hand	Teamwork	21 August 2002
174	39	"Jobs"	Hand in Hand	Teamwork	22 August 2002
175	40	"Making a Movie"	Hand in Hand	Teamwork	23 August 2002
176	41	"Colours"	Reach Out	Finding Out	26 August 2002
177	42	"About and Around Me"	Reach Out	Finding Out	27 August 2002
178	43	"Experiments"	Reach Out	Finding Out	28 August 2002
179	44	"Cleverness"	Reach Out	Finding Out	29 August 2002
180	45	"Creativity"	Reach Out	Finding Out	30 August 2002

=== Series 5 (2003) ===
No. overall	No. in series	Title	Song of the Week	Theme	Original release date
181	1	"Family Celebrations"	Come On and Party	Festivals	8 September 2003
182	2	"Around the World"	Come On and Party	Festivals	9 September 2003
183	3	"Community Events"	Come On and Party	Festivals	10 September 2003
184	4	"Christmas Traditions"	Come On and Party	Festivals	11 September 2003
185	5	"Funny Festivals"	Come On and Party	Festivals	12 September 2003
186	6	"Memories"	Give Five	Family	15 September 2003
187	7	"Love"	Give Five	Family	16 September 2003
188	8	"Pets"	Give Five	Family	17 September 2003
189	9	"Washing Day"	Give Five	Family	18 September 2003
190	10	"Working Together"	Give Five	Family	19 September 2003
191	11	"Machines"	Build it Up	Building	22 September 2003
192	12	"Dwellings"	Build it Up	Building	23 September 2003
193	13	"Tools"	Build it Up	Building	24 September 2003
194	14	"Long Ago"	Build it Up	Building	25 September 2003
195	15	"Gardens"	Build it Up	Building	26 September 2003
196	16	"Different Kinds of Water"	Our World	World	29 September 2003
197	17	"Different Kinds of Land"	Our World	World	30 September 2003
198	18	"Food"	Our World	World	1 October 2003
199	19	"Earth Treasures"	Our World	World	2 October 2003
200	20	"People and Animals"	Our World	World	3 October 2003
201	21	"I Love to Be"	L.O.V.E.	Happy	6 October 2003
202	22	"Favourite Things"	L.O.V.E.	Happy	7 October 2003
203	23	"Favourite Animals"	L.O.V.E.	Happy	8 October 2003
204	24	"I Love to Make"	L.O.V.E.	Happy	9 October 2003
205	25	"I Love to Go"	L.O.V.E.	Happy	10 October 2003
206	26	"Magical Animals"	Dream On	Magic	13 October 2003
207	27	"Magic in Nature"	Dream On	Magic	14 October 2003
208	28	"Magic in Me"	Dream On	Magic	15 October 2003
209	29	"Magical Dress Up Party"	Dream On	Magic	16 October 2003
210	30	"Silly"	Dream On	Magic	17 October 2003
211	31	"Jobs"	Ready or Not	Work and Play	20 October 2003
212	32	"Animals"	Ready or Not	Work and Play	21 October 2003
213	33	"Street Parade"	Ready or Not	Work and Play	22 October 2003
214	34	"Outer Space"	Ready or Not	Work and Play	23 October 2003
215	35	"Getting Ready"	Ready or Not	Work and Play	24 October 2003
216	36	"Sports"	Holiday	Holidays	27 October 2003
217	37	"A Time for Me"	Holiday	Holidays	28 October 2003
218	38	"Family Fun"	Holiday	Holidays	29 October 2003
219	39	"Get Fit"	Holiday	Holidays	30 October 2003
220	40	"Travelling"	Holiday	Holidays	31 October 2003
221	41	"Curiosity"	Underwater Discovery	Discovery	3 November 2003
222	42	"Mysteries"	Underwater Discovery	Discovery	4 November 2003
223	43	"Other Worlds"	Underwater Discovery	Discovery	5 November 2003
224	44	"Fantasy"	Underwater Discovery	Discovery	6 November 2003
225	45	"Experiments"	Underwater Discovery	Discovery	7 November 2003

=== Series 6 (2004) ===
No. overall	No. in series	Title	Song of the Week	Theme	Original release date
226	1	"Outer Space"	Hi-5 Base to Outer Space	Exploring	18 October 2004
227	2	"Our World"	Hi-5 Base to Outer Space	Exploring	19 October 2004
228	3	"New Ideas"	Hi-5 Base to Outer Space	Exploring	20 October 2004
229	4	"World of Nature"	Hi-5 Base to Outer Space	Exploring	21 October 2004
230	5	"The Past"	Hi-5 Base to Outer Space	Exploring	22 October 2004
231	6	"Fantasy Fun"	I Believe in Magic	Dream Wishes	25 October 2004
232	7	"Adventures"	I Believe in Magic	Dream Wishes	26 October 2004
233	8	"I Wish"	I Believe in Magic	Dream Wishes	27 October 2004
234	9	"Magic in Me"	I Believe in Magic	Dream Wishes	28 October 2004
235	10	"Big Dreams"	I Believe in Magic	Dream Wishes	29 October 2004
236	11	"Get Moving"	Do It All Again	Get Moving	1 November 2004
237	12	"Get Moving Together"	Do It All Again	Get Moving	2 November 2004
238	13	"Get Moving Creatively"	Do It All Again	Get Moving	3 November 2004
239	14	"Machines"	Do It All Again	Get Moving	4 November 2004
240	15	"Get Moving Outside"	Do It All Again	Get Moving	5 November 2004
241	16	"I Love to Do"	How Much Do I Love You?	Heartbeat	8 November 2004
242	17	"Close to Me"	How Much Do I Love You?	Heartbeat	9 November 2004
243	18	"Working it Out"	How Much Do I Love You?	Heartbeat	10 November 2004
244	19	"Heart"	How Much Do I Love You?	Heartbeat	11 November 2004
245	20	"Making"	How Much Do I Love You?	Heartbeat	12 November 2004
246	21	"Happy"	I'm Feeling Fine	Feeling Fine	15 November 2004
247	22	"Having Fun"	I'm Feeling Fine	Feeling Fine	16 November 2004
248	23	"Strong and Brave"	I'm Feeling Fine	Feeling Fine	17 November 2004
249	24	"Ideas"	I'm Feeling Fine	Feeling Fine	18 November 2004
250	25	"Celebrations"	I'm Feeling Fine	Feeling Fine	19 November 2004
251	26	"Outside Play"	Snakes and Ladders	Playtime	22 November 2004
252	27	"Pretend Play"	Snakes and Ladders	Playtime	23 November 2004
253	28	"Number Play"	Snakes and Ladders	Playtime	24 November 2004
254	29	"Pattern Play"	Snakes and Ladders	Playtime	25 November 2004
255	30	"Animal Play"	Snakes and Ladders	Playtime	26 November 2004

=== Series 7 (2005) ===
No. overall	No. in series	Title	Song of the Week	Theme	Original release date
256	1	"In Nature"	Making Music	Making	23 May 2005
257	2	"A Work of Art"	Making Music	Making	24 May 2005
258	3	"A Space for Me"	Making Music	Making	25 May 2005
259	4	"A Surprise"	Making Music	Making	26 May 2005
260	5	"Things Animals Create"	Making Music	Making	27 May 2005
261	6	"Nature"	Ch-Ch-Changing	Changing	30 May 2005
262	7	"People"	Ch-Ch-Changing	Changing	31 May 2005
263	8	"The World"	Ch-Ch-Changing	Changing	1 June 2005
264	9	"In Your Home"	Ch-Ch-Changing	Changing	2 June 2005
265	10	"Changing Shape"	Ch-Ch-Changing	Changing	3 June 2005
266	11	"Games and Sports"	Action Hero	Action	6 June 2005
267	12	"Jobs"	Action Hero	Action	7 June 2005
268	13	"Machines and Other Things That Move"	Action Hero	Action	8 June 2005
269	14	"Action Heroes"	Action Hero	Action	9 June 2005
270	15	"Health and Fitness"	Action Hero	Action	10 June 2005
271	16	"Welcome"	Come Around to My Place	Visiting	13 June 2005
272	17	"Special Places of Interest"	Come Around to My Place	Visiting	14 June 2005
273	18	"Hello"	Come Around to My Place	Visiting	15 June 2005
274	19	"Animal Visits and Visitors"	Come Around to My Place	Visiting	16 June 2005
275	20	"Imaginary Places, People and Things"	Come Around to My Place	Visiting	17 June 2005
276	21	"Landscapes"	City and Country	City, Country	20 June 2005
277	22	"Animals"	City and Country	City, Country	21 June 2005
278	23	"Day and Night"	City and Country	City, Country	22 June 2005
279	24	"Food and Crops"	City and Country	City, Country	23 June 2005
280	25	"Every Day"	City and Country	City, Country	24 June 2005
281	26	"Colours in Nature"	Rainbow 'Round the World	Rainbows	27 June 2005
282	27	"Animals"	Rainbow 'Round the World	Rainbows	28 June 2005
283	28	"Mixing, Making and Discovering"	Rainbow 'Round the World	Rainbows	29 June 2005
284	29	"Colourful"	Rainbow 'Round the World	Rainbows	30 June 2005
285	30	"Contrast and Affinity"	Rainbow 'Round the World	Rainbows	1 July 2005
286	31	"Sports"	T.E.A.M.	Teams	4 July 2005
287	32	"When Am I a Team Player?"	T.E.A.M.	Teams	5 July 2005
288	33	"Animals"	T.E.A.M.	Teams	6 July 2005
289	34	"Cooperation and Communities"	T.E.A.M.	Teams	7 July 2005
290	35	"Teams"	T.E.A.M.	Teams	8 July 2005
291	36	"World"	Some Kind of Wonderful	Wonderful	11 July 2005
292	37	"People"	Some Kind of Wonderful	Wonderful	12 July 2005
293	38	"Places"	Some Kind of Wonderful	Wonderful	13 July 2005
294	39	"Days"	Some Kind of Wonderful	Wonderful	14 July 2005
295	40	"Gifts and Treasures"	Some Kind of Wonderful	Wonderful	15 July 2005
296	41	"Animals"	Planet Disco	Journeys	18 July 2005
297	42	"People"	Planet Disco	Journeys	19 July 2005
298	43	"Places"	Planet Disco	Journeys	20 July 2005
299	44	"Life"	Planet Disco	Journeys	21 July 2005
300	45	"Journeys Through Your Imagination"	Planet Disco	Journeys	22 July 2005

=== Series 8 (2006) ===
No. overall	No. in series	Title	Song of the Week	Theme	Original release date
301	1	"What If?"	Wish Upon a Star	Wondering	12 June 2006
302	2	"Wonderful Nature"	Wish Upon a Star	Wondering	13 June 2006
303	3	"Wonderful Creatures"	Wish Upon a Star	Wondering	14 June 2006
304	4	"Mysteries"	Wish Upon a Star	Wondering	15 June 2006
305	5	"Dreaming and Wishing"	Wish Upon a Star	Wondering	16 June 2006
306	6	"Travel"	Are We There Yet?	Travelling	19 June 2006
307	7	"Near and Far"	Are We There Yet?	Travelling	20 June 2006
308	8	"Imaginative"	Are We There Yet?	Travelling	21 June 2006
309	9	"New and Old Modes of Transport"	Are We There Yet?	Travelling	22 June 2006
310	10	"Holidays"	Are We There Yet?	Travelling	23 June 2006
311	11	"Places"	Have Some Fun	Enjoying	26 June 2006
312	12	"Things"	Have Some Fun	Enjoying	27 June 2006
313	13	""Being Me" Skills"	Have Some Fun	Enjoying	28 June 2006
314	14	"Times"	Have Some Fun	Enjoying	29 June 2006
315	15	"Differences"	Have Some Fun	Enjoying	30 June 2006
316	16	"Body"	Growing Up	Growing	3 July 2006
317	17	"Big and Small"	Growing Up	Growing	4 July 2006
318	18	"Animals and Plants"	Growing Up	Growing	5 July 2006
319	19	"Building"	Growing Up	Growing	6 July 2006
320	20	"Age"	Growing Up	Growing	7 July 2006
321	21	"Health"	Hey, What's Cooking!	Doing	10 July 2006
322	22	"Working"	Hey, What's Cooking!	Doing	11 July 2006
323	23	"Arts and Crafts"	Hey, What's Cooking!	Doing	12 July 2006
324	24	"Can Do"	Hey, What's Cooking!	Doing	13 July 2006
325	25	"Playing"	Hey, What's Cooking!	Doing	14 July 2006
326	26	"Multicultural"	Special	Variety	17 July 2006
327	27	"Family Groups"	Special	Variety	18 July 2006
328	28	"Food"	Special	Variety	19 July 2006
329	29	"Weird is Good"	Special	Variety	20 July 2006
330	30	"Mixing"	Special	Variety	21 July 2006
331	31	"Animals and the Natural World"	Peek-a-Boo	Finding	24 July 2006
332	32	"How Does it Work?"	Peek-a-Boo	Finding	25 July 2006
333	33	"Exploring and Adventures"	Peek-a-Boo	Finding	26 July 2006
334	34	"Other Countries"	Peek-a-Boo	Finding	27 July 2006
335	35	"Arts and Crafts"	Peek-a-Boo	Finding	28 July 2006
336	36	"Who Will I Be?"	Pretending Day	Pretending	31 July 2006
337	37	"Performing Events"	Pretending Day	Pretending	1 August 2006
338	38	"Where Will I Be?"	Pretending Day	Pretending	2 August 2006
339	39	"Puppets"	Pretending Day	Pretending	3 August 2006
340	40	"Playing Together"	Pretending Day	Pretending	4 August 2006
341	41	"Friends and Family"	Share Everything with You	Sharing	7 August 2006
342	42	"Animals"	Share Everything with You	Sharing	8 August 2006
343	43	"I've Got an Idea"	Share Everything with You	Sharing	9 August 2006
344	44	"Games"	Share Everything with You	Sharing	10 August 2006
345	45	"Talking and Communication"	Share Everything with You	Sharing	11 August 2006

=== Series 9 (2007) ===
No. overall	No. in series	Title	Song of the Week	Theme	Original release date
346	1	"Babies"	Around the World	World	11 June 2007
347	2	"Birthdays"	Around the World	World	12 June 2007
348	3	"First Day of School"	Around the World	World	13 June 2007
349	4	"Meals"	Around the World	World	14 June 2007
350	5	"Environment / Animals"	Around the World	World	15 June 2007
351	6	"Food"	Happy Today	Happy	18 June 2007
352	7	"Move Your Body"	Happy Today	Happy	19 June 2007
353	8	"Routines"	Happy Today	Happy	20 June 2007
354	9	"What Makes Me Happy"	Happy Today	Happy	21 June 2007
355	10	"Community Carers"	Happy Today	Happy	22 June 2007
356	11	"Body Language"	Stop and Go	Communicate	25 June 2007
357	12	"Ways of Saying"	Stop and Go	Communicate	26 June 2007
358	13	"Technology"	Stop and Go	Communicate	27 June 2007
359	14	"Animals"	Stop and Go	Communicate	28 June 2007
360	15	"The Arts"	Stop and Go	Communicate	29 June 2007
361	16	"Creatures and Things in Nature"	Wow!	Amazing	2 July 2007
362	17	"People"	Wow!	Amazing	3 July 2007
363	18	"Ideas and Imagination"	Wow!	Amazing	4 July 2007
364	19	"Places and Buildings"	Wow!	Amazing	5 July 2007
365	20	"Bodies"	Wow!	Amazing	6 July 2007
366	21	"Old Places"	Time Machine	Old and New	9 July 2007
367	22	"People and Animals"	Time Machine	Old and New	10 July 2007
368	23	"New Cities and Inventions"	Time Machine	Old and New	11 July 2007
369	24	"Treasures"	Time Machine	Old and New	12 July 2007
370	25	"Ways of Recording Experience"	Time Machine	Old and New	13 July 2007
371	26	"Different Ways to Be Brave"	Strong and Brave	Brave and Strong	16 July 2007
372	27	"First Steps (Give it a Go)"	Strong and Brave	Brave and Strong	17 July 2007
373	28	"Adventure"	Strong and Brave	Brave and Strong	18 July 2007
374	29	"Imagine You Can Do It"	Strong and Brave	Brave and Strong	19 July 2007
375	30	"Circus"	Strong and Brave	Brave and Strong	20 July 2007
376	31	"Changing Looks"	Switching	Switching	23 July 2007
377	32	"Animals and Nature"	Switching	Switching	24 July 2007
378	33	"Energy"	Switching	Switching	25 July 2007
379	34	"Moving Places / Houses"	Switching	Switching	26 July 2007
380	35	"Try it a Different Way"	Switching	Switching	27 July 2007
381	36	"Indoors / Outdoors"	Love All Around	Look Around	30 July 2007
382	37	"Under the Surface"	Love All Around	Look Around	31 July 2007
383	38	"How Does it Work?"	Love All Around	Look Around	1 August 2007
384	39	"Ways to Get Around"	Love All Around	Look Around	2 August 2007
385	40	"I Wonder"	Love All Around	Look Around	3 August 2007
386	41	"Special Days"	Party Street	Celebrating	6 August 2007
387	42	"Us (You and Me)"	Party Street	Celebrating	7 August 2007
388	43	"Nature"	Party Street	Celebrating	8 August 2007
389	44	"Difference"	Party Street	Celebrating	9 August 2007
390	45	"Feasts and Festivals"	Party Street	Celebrating	10 August 2007

=== Series 10 (2008) ===
No. overall	No. in series	Title	Song of the Week	Theme	Original release date
391	1	"Playing Games"	Playtime	Playtime	7 July 2008
392	2	"Dress Ups"	Playtime	Playtime	8 July 2008
393	3	"Silly is Good"	Playtime	Playtime	9 July 2008
394	4	"Puzzles"	Playtime	Playtime	10 July 2008
395	5	"Imaginary Friends and Places"	Playtime	Playtime	11 July 2008
396	6	"Different Families"	We're a Family	Family	14 July 2008
397	7	"Animals and Pets"	We're a Family	Family	15 July 2008
398	8	"Family Holiday"	We're a Family	Family	16 July 2008
399	9	"Getting Along"	We're a Family	Family	17 July 2008
400	10	"Doing Things Together"	We're a Family	Family	18 July 2008
401	11	"Backyards and Recycling"	Planet Earth	Planet Earth	21 July 2008
402	12	"Adventures"	Planet Earth	Planet Earth	22 July 2008
403	13	"Wild Life"	Planet Earth	Planet Earth	23 July 2008
404	14	"Exploring"	Planet Earth	Planet Earth	24 July 2008
405	15	"Land and Sea"	Planet Earth	Planet Earth	25 July 2008
406	16	"Trying Out New Things"	The Best Things in Life Are Free	Be Free	28 July 2008
407	17	"Daring"	The Best Things in Life Are Free	Be Free	29 July 2008
408	18	"Making Your Own Fun"	The Best Things in Life Are Free	Be Free	30 July 2008
409	19	"Things to Do"	The Best Things in Life Are Free	Be Free	31 July 2008
410	20	"Hi-5 Fun Park"	The Best Things in Life Are Free	Be Free	1 August 2008
411	21	"Fairyland"	Abracadabra	Abracadabra	4 August 2008
412	22	"Making Magic"	Abracadabra	Abracadabra	5 August 2008
413	23	"Magical Creatures"	Abracadabra	Abracadabra	6 August 2008
414	24	"Magical Journeys"	Abracadabra	Abracadabra	7 August 2008
415	25	"Magical Stories"	Abracadabra	Abracadabra	8 August 2008
416	26	"Wild and Wacky"	Jump and Shout	Jump and Shout	11 August 2008
417	27	"Move It"	Jump and Shout	Jump and Shout	12 August 2008
418	28	"Dress Up"	Jump and Shout	Jump and Shout	13 August 2008
419	29	"Exploring and Finding Out"	Jump and Shout	Jump and Shout	14 August 2008
420	30	"Move Your Body"	Jump and Shout	Jump and Shout	15 August 2008
421	31	"Future"	When I Grow Up	Tomorrow	18 August 2008
422	32	"What's On Tomorrow?"	When I Grow Up	Tomorrow	19 August 2008
423	33	"Looking Forward"	When I Grow Up	Tomorrow	20 August 2008
424	34	"Our World in the Future"	When I Grow Up	Tomorrow	21 August 2008
425	35	"Ways to Get Around in the Future"	When I Grow Up	Tomorrow	22 August 2008
426	36	"Gadgets"	Techno World	Techno World	25 August 2008
427	37	"Contraptions"	Techno World	Techno World	26 August 2008
428	38	"Computer World"	Techno World	Techno World	27 August 2008
429	39	"Time Travel"	Techno World	Techno World	28 August 2008
430	40	"Sending Messages"	Techno World	Techno World	29 August 2008
431	41	"Fun Action"	Come Alive	Come Alive	1 September 2008
432	42	"Recharge"	Come Alive	Come Alive	2 September 2008
433	43	"Getting Focused"	Come Alive	Come Alive	3 September 2008
434	44	"World Outside"	Come Alive	Come Alive	4 September 2008
435	45	"Being a Team Player"	Come Alive	Come Alive	5 September 2008

=== Series 11 (2009) ===
No. overall	No. in series	Title	Song of the Week	Theme	Original release date
436	1	"On Safari"	Stop, Look, Listen	Explore	31 August 2009
437	2	"The Great Indoors - Around the House"	Stop, Look, Listen	Explore	1 September 2009
438	3	"Country / City"	Stop, Look, Listen	Explore	2 September 2009
439	4	"Space"	Stop, Look, Listen	Explore	3 September 2009
440	5	"Under the Sea"	Stop, Look, Listen	Explore	4 September 2009
441	6	"Teams"	Spin Me Round	Friends	7 September 2009
442	7	"Brothers and Sisters"	Spin Me Round	Friends	8 September 2009
443	8	"Play Together"	Spin Me Round	Friends	9 September 2009
444	9	"Making Friends"	Spin Me Round	Friends	10 September 2009
445	10	"Animal Friends"	Spin Me Round	Friends	11 September 2009
446	11	"Something New"	Zoo Party	Celebrate	14 September 2009
447	12	"Superheroes"	Zoo Party	Celebrate	15 September 2009
448	13	"Adventures"	Zoo Party	Celebrate	16 September 2009
449	14	"Games"	Zoo Party	Celebrate	17 September 2009
450	15	"Why You're Special"	Zoo Party	Celebrate	18 September 2009
451	16	"Mysteries - Be An Investigator"	Knock, Knock, Knock	Curiosity	21 September 2009
452	17	"Inventions"	Knock, Knock, Knock	Curiosity	22 September 2009
453	18	"What Will I Be When I Grow Up?"	Knock, Knock, Knock	Curiosity	23 September 2009
454	19	"Finding Treasure"	Knock, Knock, Knock	Curiosity	24 September 2009
455	20	"Human Body"	Knock, Knock, Knock	Curiosity	25 September 2009
456	21	"Snowy Time"	Four Seasons	Natural World	28 September 2009
457	22	"Summer Time"	Four Seasons	Natural World	29 September 2009
458	23	"Rainbows"	Four Seasons	Natural World	30 September 2009
459	24	"Changing"	Four Seasons	Natural World	1 October 2009
460	25	"Planet Earth"	Four Seasons	Natural World	2 October 2009
461	26	"Christmas"	Let's Get Away	Holidays	5 October 2009
462	27	"Celebrations Around the World"	Let's Get Away	Holidays	6 October 2009
463	28	"Travelling"	Let's Get Away	Holidays	7 October 2009
464	29	"Planes, Trains, and Automobiles"	Let's Get Away	Holidays	8 October 2009
465	30	"Visiting"	Let's Get Away	Holidays	9 October 2009
466	31	"Let's Dance!"	Happy Monster Dance	Be Active	12 October 2009
467	32	"Being Sporty"	Happy Monster Dance	Be Active	13 October 2009
468	33	"Building"	Happy Monster Dance	Be Active	14 October 2009
469	34	"My Body"	Happy Monster Dance	Be Active	15 October 2009
470	35	"Things to Do"	Happy Monster Dance	Be Active	16 October 2009
471	36	"Mystical Creatures"	Living in a Fairytale	Imagine	19 October 2009
472	37	"Imaginary Journeys"	Living in a Fairytale	Imagine	20 October 2009
473	38	"The Future"	Living in a Fairytale	Imagine	21 October 2009
474	39	"Dress Ups"	Living in a Fairytale	Imagine	22 October 2009
475	40	"Dreams"	Living in a Fairytale	Imagine	23 October 2009
476	41	"Making Things / Collecting"	Favourite Teddy Bear	Favourite Things	26 October 2009
477	42	"Food"	Favourite Teddy Bear	Favourite Things	27 October 2009
478	43	"Colours"	Favourite Teddy Bear	Favourite Things	28 October 2009
479	44	"Toys"	Favourite Teddy Bear	Favourite Things	29 October 2009
480	45	"Music"	Favourite Teddy Bear	Favourite Things	30 October 2009

=== Series 12 (2010) ===
No. overall	No. in series	Title	Song of the Week	Theme	Original release date
481	1	"Pets"	Hi-5 Farm	Animal Fun	13 September 2010
482	2	"On the Farm"	Hi-5 Farm	Animal Fun	14 September 2010
483	3	"Jungle Adventure"	Hi-5 Farm	Animal Fun	15 September 2010
484	4	"Animals with Jobs"	Hi-5 Farm	Animal Fun	16 September 2010
485	5	"Under the Sea"	Hi-5 Farm	Animal Fun	17 September 2010
486	6	"Things That Grow"	Stand Up Tall on Tippy Toes	Growing	20 September 2010
487	7	"Building"	Stand Up Tall on Tippy Toes	Growing	21 September 2010
488	8	"Growing Up"	Stand Up Tall on Tippy Toes	Growing	22 September 2010
489	9	"Gardens"	Stand Up Tall on Tippy Toes	Growing	23 September 2010
490	10	"Strong Bodies"	Stand Up Tall on Tippy Toes	Growing	24 September 2010
491	11	"Experiments"	Martian Groove	Discovery	27 September 2010
492	12	"In Nature"	Martian Groove	Discovery	28 September 2010
493	13	"Outer Space"	Martian Groove	Discovery	29 September 2010
494	14	"Something New"	Martian Groove	Discovery	30 September 2010
495	15	"Why I'm Special"	Martian Groove	Discovery	1 October 2010
496	16	"Bedrooms and Bathrooms"	Happy House	Home	4 October 2010
497	17	"In the Kitchen"	Happy House	Home	5 October 2010
498	18	"Backyard Games"	Happy House	Home	6 October 2010
499	19	"Fun with Friends"	Happy House	Home	7 October 2010
500	20	"Family"	Happy House	Home	8 October 2010
501	21	"Making"	The Dancing Bus	Let's Do It	11 October 2010
502	22	"Summer Holiday"	The Dancing Bus	Let's Do It	12 October 2010
503	23	"Dance"	The Dancing Bus	Let's Do It	13 October 2010
504	24	"Winter Holiday"	The Dancing Bus	Let's Do It	14 October 2010
505	25	"Celebrations"	The Dancing Bus	Let's Do It	15 October 2010
506	26	"Puppets"	Toy Box	Toys	18 October 2010
507	27	"Teddy Bear Adventures"	Toy Box	Toys	19 October 2010
508	28	"Games"	Toy Box	Toys	20 October 2010
509	29	"Favourite Things"	Toy Box	Toys	21 October 2010
510	30	"Sporty Things"	Toy Box	Toys	22 October 2010
511	31	"Techno World"	Backyard Adventurers	Adventure	25 October 2010
512	32	"Superheroes"	Backyard Adventurers	Adventure	26 October 2010
513	33	"Marvellous Machines"	Backyard Adventurers	Adventure	27 October 2010
514	34	"Travelling Circus"	Backyard Adventurers	Adventure	28 October 2010
515	35	"Pre School / Daycare Fun"	Backyard Adventurers	Adventure	29 October 2010
516	36	"Fairy Creatures"	Hey Presto!	Magic	1 November 2010
517	37	"Magic in Nature"	Hey Presto!	Magic	2 November 2010
518	38	"Magical Journeys"	Hey Presto!	Magic	3 November 2010
519	39	"Science Magic"	Hey Presto!	Magic	4 November 2010
520	40	"Magical Me!"	Hey Presto!	Magic	5 November 2010
521	41	"Party"	Turn the Music Up!	Surprise	8 November 2010
522	42	"Surprise Visitors"	Turn the Music Up!	Surprise	9 November 2010
523	43	"What's Inside?"	Turn the Music Up!	Surprise	10 November 2010
524	44	"Babies - Something New"	Turn the Music Up!	Surprise	11 November 2010
525	45	"Treasures"	Turn the Music Up!	Surprise	12 November 2010

=== Series 13 (2011) ===
No. overall	No. in series	Title	Song of the Week	Theme	Original release date
526	1	"Wonders of the World"	Wow! (Note: Labelled as "Amazing")	Amazing	17 October 2011
527	2	"Amazing Space"	Wow!	Amazing	18 October 2011
528	3	"Magic"	Wow!	Amazing	19 October 2011
529	4	"Heroes"	Wow!	Amazing	20 October 2011
530	5	"Miniature World"	Wow!	Amazing	21 October 2011
531	6	"Discovery Under the Sea"	Underwater Discovery	Water World	24 October 2011
532	7	"On the Water"	Underwater Discovery	Water World	25 October 2011
533	8	"At the Beach"	Underwater Discovery	Water World	26 October 2011
534	9	"Island Life"	Underwater Discovery	Water World	27 October 2011
535	10	"Coral Reef"	Underwater Discovery	Water World	28 October 2011
536	11	"Love"	L.O.V.E.	Feel Good	31 October 2011
537	12	"Doing"	L.O.V.E.	Feel Good	1 November 2011
538	13	"Helping Others"	L.O.V.E.	Feel Good	2 November 2011
539	14	"Achieving"	L.O.V.E.	Feel Good	3 November 2011
540	15	"Favourite Things"	L.O.V.E.	Feel Good	4 November 2011
541	16	"Robots"	Robot Number One	Machines	7 November 2011
542	17	"Inventions"	Robot Number One	Machines	8 November 2011
543	18	"Fantastic Buildings"	Robot Number One	Machines	9 November 2011
544	19	"Time Machine"	Robot Number One	Machines	10 November 2011
545	20	"Planes, Trains and Automobiles"	Robot Number One	Machines	11 November 2011
546	21	"Star Magic"	Wish Upon a Star	Dreaming	14 November 2011
547	22	"Dreaming"	Wish Upon a Star	Dreaming	15 November 2011
548	23	"When I Grow Up"	Wish Upon a Star	Dreaming	16 November 2011
549	24	"Journeys of Imagination"	Wish Upon a Star	Dreaming	17 November 2011
550	25	"Wishes"	Wish Upon a Star	Dreaming	18 November 2011
551	26	"Human Body"	Five Senses	About Me	21 November 2011
552	27	"Food"	Five Senses	About Me	22 November 2011
553	28	"I'm Special"	Five Senses	About Me	23 November 2011
554	29	"Sensory Play"	Five Senses	About Me	24 November 2011
555	30	"Happy"	Five Senses	About Me	25 November 2011
556	31	"Friendship"	Some Kind of Wonderful (Note: Labelled as "Wonderful")	Friends	28 November 2011
557	32	"Animal Friends"	Some Kind of Wonderful	Friends	29 November 2011
558	33	"Families"	Some Kind of Wonderful	Friends	30 November 2011
559	34	"Celebrations with Friends"	Some Kind of Wonderful	Friends	1 December 2011
560	35	"Making Friends"	Some Kind of Wonderful	Friends	2 December 2011
561	36	"Games"	Ready or Not	Games	5 December 2011
562	37	"Teams"	Ready or Not	Games	6 December 2011
563	38	"Inside Sports"	Ready or Not	Games	7 December 2011
564	39	"Animal Sports Day"	Ready or Not	Games	8 December 2011
565	40	"Sideshow Alley"	Ready or Not	Games	9 December 2011
566	41	"Making Music"	Making Music	Music	12 December 2011
567	42	"Dancing"	Making Music	Music	13 December 2011
568	43	"Music Around the World"	Making Music	Music	14 December 2011
569	44	"Sounds in Nature"	Making Music	Music	15 December 2011
570	45	"Musical Instruments"	Making Music	Music	16 December 2011

== Revived series (2017) ==
=== Series 1 (2017) ===
No. overall	No. in series	Title	Song of the Week	Theme	Original release date
571	1	"Making Music"	Hi-5 Dance Off	Music and Dance	15 May 2017
572	2	"Ballet, Tap, and Jazz"	Hi-5 Dance Off	Music and Dance	16 May 2017
573	3	"World Dance & Music"	Hi-5 Dance Off	Music and Dance	17 May 2017
574	4	"Hip Hop"	Hi-5 Dance Off	Music and Dance	18 May 2017
575	5	"Rock and Roll"	Hi-5 Dance Off	Music and Dance	19 May 2017
576	6	"Fantasy Fun"	Abracadabra	Dream Wishes	22 May 2017
577	7	"Imaginary Adventures"	Abracadabra	Dream Wishes	23 May 2017
578	8	"Wishing"	Abracadabra	Dream Wishes	24 May 2017
579	9	"Big Dreams"	Abracadabra	Dream Wishes	25 May 2017
580	10	"Magic in Me"	Abracadabra	Dream Wishes	26 May 2017
581	11	"Saving Energy / Natural Energy"	Stop and Go	Energy	29 May 2017
582	12	"How to Feel Energetic"	Stop and Go	Energy	30 May 2017
583	13	"Science"	Stop and Go	Energy	31 May 2017
584	14	"Inventions"	Stop and Go	Energy	1 June 2017
585	15	"Vehicles"	Stop and Go	Energy	2 June 2017
586	16	"Your World"	Living in a Rainbow	Colours	5 June 2017
587	17	"The World"	Living in a Rainbow	Colours	6 June 2017
588	18	"Making and Mixing"	Living in a Rainbow	Colours	7 June 2017
589	19	"Favourites and Feelings"	Living in a Rainbow	Colours	8 June 2017
590	20	"Wonderful"	Living in a Rainbow	Colours	9 June 2017
591	21	"Country Fair"	Party Street	Fairs and Festivals	12 June 2017
592	22	"Animal Fun"	Party Street	Fairs and Festivals	13 June 2017
593	23	"Circus"	Party Street	Fairs and Festivals	14 June 2017
594	24	"Holidays"	Party Street	Fairs and Festivals	15 June 2017
595	25	"Cultural Festivals"	Party Street	Fairs and Festivals	16 June 2017
