= Cat Sandion =

British television presenter

- Born: 8 September 1985 (age 40); London, England
- Occupation: Television presenter
- Known for: Hi-5 (2008); CBeebies (2013–present)

Catherine "Cat" Sandion (born 8 September 1985) is a British television presenter. She is of Mauritian heritage. She began presenting in 2008, starting a television career as a member of the cast of Hi-5, the British version of the Australian children's television programme also called Hi-5. Sandion began presenting CBeebies in January 2013.

From 2017 to 2018, Sandion presented a show on CBeebies called Magic Door. In 2016 she joined the cast of Justin's House for the fourth series.
