= Oratorio Society of New York =

American choral ensemble

The Oratorio Society of New York is a not-for-profit membership organization that performs choral music in the oratorio style. Founded in 1873 by conductor Leopold Damrosch, it is the third oldest musical organization in New York City. The Society had a prominent role in the building of Carnegie Hall. Throughout its history, it has premiered many new choral works.

Kent Tritle was appointed as the Society's 11th music director in January 2006, succeeding Lyndon Woodside.

== History ==
Various individuals are credited with inspiring Damrosch's decision to found the Society: Anton Rubinstein, Marie Reno (wife of the Society's secretary Morris Reno), Elkan and Bertha Naumburg, and three unnamed women who felt New York needed a singing society like the ones they had heard on a recent trip to Germany. Bertha Naumburg is said to have suggested the name.

Rehearsals at the Society began in March 1873. On December 3, the Society presented its first concert. One year later, on Christmas night, the Society began what has become an unbroken tradition of annual performances of Handel's Messiah. In 1885, Walter Damrosch, the son of Leopold Damrosch, became conductor after his father's death.

In 1884 Andrew Carnegie joined the Society's board of directors, serving as its president from 1888 to 1919. Three years later, Carnegie added his support to a fund to build a hall that was suitable for choral music. He engaged architect William Tuthill, to design the "Music Hall," now known as Carnegie Hall. Carnegie hall opened in May 1891 with a five-day festival.

In April 1923 the Society, in conjunction with the experimental radio station, WEAF, presented the first choral concert broadcast from Carnegie Hall.

The Society has presented the U.S. premiere of Brahms' A German Requiem (1877), Berlioz' Roméo et Juliette (1882), a full-concert production of Wagner's Parsifal at the Metropolitan Opera House (1886), Tchaikovsky's a cappella Legend and Pater noster (1891) and Eugene Onegin (1908), the now-standard version of The Star-Spangled Banner (1917), Bach's Mass in B Minor (1927), Dvořák's Saint Ludmila (1993), Britten's The World of the Spirit (1998), and Filas' Song of Solomon (2012). The Society has also presented works by Handel, Liszt, Schütz, Schubert, Debussy, Elgar, and Saint-Saëns.

== Outreach ==
In 1977, the Society inaugurated an oratorio solo competition. International in scope, it is the only significant competition devoted to oratorio solos. In 2006, the competition was renamed the Lyndon Woodside Oratorio-Solo Competition in honor of Lyndon Woodside.

The Society's education program offers high school students in New York City classroom instruction and free tickets to its concerts. It also reaches out to teens by contributing tickets to High 5 Tickets to the Arts. The Society was instrumental in the 2010 founding of the New York Choral Consortium, a member organization comprising 65 choral groups—professional and avocational—throughout the metropolitan area.

== Awards and honors ==
On its 100th anniversary in 1973, the Society was presented with the Handel Medallion for its contributions to the musical life of the city. At its May 1998 125th anniversary concert, the Society was honored by Mayor Rudolph Giuliani as: "One of the most treasured institutions of our city's musical life . . . making all New York music lovers grateful for this venerable institution which helps keep our city the music capital of the world."

In March 2003, the Society received the UNESCO Commemorative Medal and the Cocos Island World Natural Heritage Site Award for its series of benefit concerts in Costa Rica. In 2004 the Society received a certificate from the St. Petersburg Submariners Club commemorating its concerts there.

== Tours ==
The Society made its European debut in Munich in 1982. Since then it has performed throughout Europe and in Asia and Latin America. In 2015, the Society performed in Halle, Quedlinburg, Dresden, and Leipzig. In 2017, the Society performed at the Teatro Solís in Montevideo, Uruguay.

== Music directors ==
	Term	Lifespan
Leopold Damrosch	1873–85	1832–85
Walter Damrosch	1885–98	1868–1950
Frank Damrosch	1898–1912	1859–1937
Louis Koemmenich	1912–17	1866–1922
Walter Damrosch	1917–21 (2nd time)	
Albert Stoessel	1921–43	1894–1943
Alfred Greenfield	1943–55	1902–83
William Strickland	1955–58	1914–91
T. Charles Lee	1959–73	1915–94
Lyndon Woodside	1973–2005	1935–2005
Kent Tritle	2006–	

== Presidents ==
	Term
Dr. F. A. P. Barnard	1873–74
S. W. Coe	1874–75
W. L. Goodwin	1875–76
Rev. William H. Cooke	1876–88
Andrew Carnegie	1888–1919
Charles M. Schwab	1919–21
No president	1921–28
Henry Sloane Coffin	1928–49
Donald H. Gray	1949–59
Caramai Carroll Mali	1959–63
Beatrice Shuttleworth	1963–73
Joseph Brinkley	1973–90
Ellen L. Blair	1990–99
Richard A. Pace	1999–2020
Robert W. Conley	2020–2024
Gyasi Barber	2024–

== Works conducted by their composers ==
February 22, 1875	Leopold Damrosch	Ruth and Naomi
May 4, 1881	Leopold Damrosch	Festival Overture
April 20 & 22, 1882	Leopold Damrosch	Sulamith
April 18 & 19, 1883	Max Bruch	Jubilate amen
May 5, 1891	Peter I. Tchaikovsky	Marche solennelle
May 7, 1891	Peter I. Tchaikovsky	Suite No.3 for Orchestra
May 8, 1891	Peter I. Tchaikovsky	Pater noster
		Legend
May 9, 1891	Walter Damrosch	To Sleep
	Peter I. Tchaikovsky	So schmerzlich
		Piano Concerto, Op. 23
January 4, 1895	Walter Damrosch	The Scarlet Letter
April 24 & 25, 1896	Georg Henschel	Stabat mater
March 19, 1907	Edward Elgar	The Apostles
March 26, 1907	Edward Elgar	The Kingdom
December 8, 1908	Gustav Mahler	Symphony No. 2
April 7, 1920	Sergei Rachmaninoff	Springtime
April 12, 1935	Walter Damrosch	Golden Jubilee
March 25, 1938	Albert Stoessel	Festival Fanfare
February 20 & 21, 1941	Walter Damrosch	Cyrano
March 1, 1957	Howard Hanson	Elegy in Memory of Serge Koussevitsky
		Lament for Beowoulf
May 8, 1962	Virgil Thomson	Missa pro defunctis
April 7, 1968	T. Charles Lee	Farewell, Voyager, Much Yet for Thee
November 8, 1980	Aaron Copland	Fanfare for the Common Man
November 8 & 9, 1980	Aaron Copland	Short Symphony
		Eight Poems of Emily Dickinson
		The Tender Land (excerpts)
