= McLeod's Daughters: Songs from the Series =

McLeod's Daughters: Songs from the Series is a series of three CDs of music from McLeod's Daughters released on the Sony BMG Australia label in 2002, 2004, and 2008.

== Production ==
The songs were written by Posie Graeme-Evans, Chris Harriott and Michaeley O'Brien. The vocals were performed by Rebecca Lavelle (who also performed much of the other music for the series) and recorded in Sydney.

== Volume 1 ==
McLeod's Daughters: Songs from the Series Volume 1

Soundtrack album
- Released: 26 August 2002
- Recorded: 2001–2002
- Studio: Sunstone (Sydney)
- Genre: Pop
- Length: 40:18
- Label: Sony
- Producer: Chris Harriot

McLeod's Daughters: Songs from the Series Volume 1 or Volume 1 was recorded from 2001 to 2002 and released on 26 August 2002. "My Heart Is Like a River" was also released as a single. The tracks were recorded by the line-up of Leon Gaer on bass guitar, Rebecca Lavelle on vocals, Peter Northcoate on guitar and Chad Wackerman on drums.

=== Track listing ===
Sony Music Australia (SMA 5086732000)

1. "Understand Me" - 2.58
2. "Common Ground" - 3.43
3. "Never Enough" - 3.46
4. "Don't Judge" - 3.54
5. "Love You, Hate You" - 3.10
6. "Heat" - 3.37
7. "Am I Crazy?" - 2.44
8. "We Got It Wrong" - 3.25
9. "The Siren's Song' - 4.58
10. "Hopeless Case" - 2.43
11. "Just A Child" - 3.20
12. "My Heart Is Like a River" - 2.11

=== Charts ===
Chart (2002)	Peak position
Australian Albums (ARIA)	8

=== Certifications ===
Region	Certification	Certified units/sales
Australia (ARIA)	Platinum	70,000^{^}
^{^} Shipments figures based on certification alone.

== Volume 2 ==
McLeod's Daughters: Songs from the Series Volume 2

Soundtrack album
- Released: 25 April 2004
- Recorded: 2002–2004
- Studio: Sunstone (Sydney)
- Genre: Pop
- Label: Sony
- Producer: Chris Harriott

McLeod's Daughters: Songs from the Series Volume 2 or Volume 2 was recorded from 2000 to 2004 and released on 25 April 2004. The line-up was Chris Harriott on keyboards, Rebecca Lavelle on vocals and Peter Northcoate on guitar.

=== Track listing ===
Sony (5160662000)

1. "Theme from McLeod's Daughters" (Seasons 1–4 version)
2. "Hey Girl (You Got a New Life)"
3. "Take the Rain Away"
4. "The Stranger"
5. "Sometimes"
6. "Too Young"
7. "The First Touch"
8. "In His Eyes"
9. "By My Side"
10. "Did I Tell You?"
11. "Don't Give Up"
12. "Gentle Gentle (Life of Your Life)"

=== Charts ===
Chart (2004)	Peak position
Australian Albums (ARIA)	19

=== Certifications ===
Region	Certification	Certified units/sales
Australia (ARIA)	Gold	35,000^{^}
^{^} Shipments figures based on certification alone.

== Volume 3 ==
McLeod's Daughters: Songs from the Series Volume 3

Soundtrack album
- Released: 1 September 2008
- Recorded: 2004–2008
- Studio: Sunstone (Sydney)
- Genre: Pop
- Length: 51:39
- Label: Sony
- Producer: Chris Harriott

McLeod's Daughters: Songs from the Series Volume 3 or Volume 3 was released on 1 September 2008. It features songs from Seasons 4-8 and includes 16 tracks. The line-up was Chris Harriott on keyboards, Rebecca Lavelle on vocals and Peter Northcoate on guitar.

=== Soundtrack listing ===
Sony (SBM 88697326822)

1. "Theme from McLeod's Daughters" (Seasons 5–8 version)
2. "You Believed"
3. "Had to Happen"
4. "It Comes to This"
5. "Charlotte's Song"
6. "One True Thing"
7. "I Wish the Past Was Different"
8. "Locked Away Inside My Heart"
9. "Our Home, Our Place"
10. "Strip Jack Naked"
11. "Broken Dreams"
12. "This Perfect Day"
13. "Trust the Night"
14. "The Man I Loved"
15. "Time Turn Over"
16. "My Heart's Home (Drovers Run)"
