= Five Bedrooms =

Australian TV series

- Genre: Comedy drama; Romantic comedy
- Created by: Christine Bartlett; Michael Lucas
- Written by: Christine Bartlett; Michael Lucas; Mithila Gupta; Xavier Coy; Alisha Hnatjuk
- Directed by: Peter Templeman; Fadia Abboud; Shirley Barrett; Corrie Chen; Fiona Banks; Adrian Chiarella
- Starring: Kat Stewart; Stephen Peacocke; Doris Younane; Katie Robertson; Roy Joseph; Hugh Sheridan; Johnny Carr
- Country of origin: Australia
- Original language: English
- No. of seasons: 4
- No. of episodes: 32

Production
- Producers: Christine Bartlett; Michael Lucas; Nathan Mayfield; Andy Walker
- Running time: 45 minutes
- Production company: Hoodlum

Original release
- Network: Network 10 (season 1); Paramount+ (seasons 2–4)
- Release: May 15, 2019 – June 18, 2023

Five Bedrooms is an Australian comedy-drama television series, which first aired on Network 10. The eight-part series premiered on 15 May 2019. In the United States, the series premiered on Peacock on April 15, 2020.

In October 2019, the drama was renewed for a second season by 10 which was set premiere in 2020, however due to the COVID-19 pandemic, the second season was rescheduled to air in 2021 instead. In May 2021, the Australian broadcast of the series was announced to be moving from Network 10 to the 10 affiliated streaming service, Paramount+. Filming of the fourth season began in Melbourne in September 2022. The fourth season of the series would get a free to air viewing from November 4, 2024 on Channel 10.

== Synopsis ==
Five Bedrooms tells the story of five people at different times of their lives. They bond after they find themselves seated together at the singles table at a wedding. After a few too many drinks, the solution to all of their problems seems to be buying a house together; a five bedroom house.

== Cast and characters ==
=== Main ===
- Kat Stewart as Liz Wendell
- Stephen Peacocke as Ben Chigwell
- Doris Younane as Heather Doyle
- Katie Robertson as Ainsley Elling
- Roy Joseph as Harpreet 'Harry' Sethi
- Hugh Sheridan as Lachlan Best (seasons 1–2, season 4)
- Johnny Carr as Kevin 'Simmo' Fitzsimons (seasons 3–4; recurring seasons 1–2)

=== Recurring ===
- Kumud Merani as Manju K. Sethi (seasons 1–2, 4)
- Alan Dukes as Colin Doyle
- Ben Schumann as Timmy Doyle
- Kyle Keuris as Louie Doyle
- Kate Jenkinson as Melanie Best
- Rodger Corser as Stuart Wendell
- Adam Fiorentino as Pete Portelli
- Josh McKenzie as Xavier
- Daniel Lapaine as Joe Chigwell
- Ingrid Torelli as Mia Chigwell-Bourke
- Samantha Cain as Rebecca Bourke
- Celia Ireland as Rhonda Hibbert
- Bert LaBonté as Ed Laurent (seasons 3–4)
- Roz Hammond as Edwina Crowe
- Dennis Coard as Marty Churle
- Victoria Eagger as Val Gunther
- Keith Brockett as Dan Chen
- Diana Nguyen as Kerri Chen
- Tracy Mann as Cheryl Elling
- Maude Davey as Pat (season 2, 3 episodes)

=== Guests ===
- Freya Stafford as Midwife Shauna
- Geraldine Hakewill as Victoria
- Louise Siversen as Karen Stefiary
- Nick Simpson-Deeks as Roger
- Jacquie Brennan as Denise Schaap
- Tony Rickards as Cliff

== Episodes ==
=== Series overview ===
Season	Episodes	Originally released		
Season	Episodes	First released	Last released	Network
1	8	May 15, 2019	July 3, 2019	Network 10
2	8	11 August 2021		Paramount+
3	8	1 January 2022		Paramount+
4	8	14 May 2023	18 June 2023	Paramount+

=== Season 1 (2019) ===
No. overall	No. in season	Title	Directed by	Written by	Original release date	Prod. code	Australian viewers (millions)
1	1	"Five Owners"	Peter Templeman	Christine Bartlett & Michael Lucas	May 15, 2019	351986-1	507,000
2	2	"Twenty Guests"	Peter Templeman	Christine Bartlett & Michael Lucas	May 22, 2019	351986-2	428,000
3	3	"Three Millimetres"	Corrie Chen	Christine Bartlett & Michael Lucas	May 29, 2019	351986-3	483,000
4	4	"Zero Dollars"	Corrie Chen	Christine Bartlett & Michael Lucas	June 5, 2019	351986-4	347,000
5	5	"Five Lies"	Fiona Banks	Mithila Gupta	June 12, 2019	351986-5	499,000
6	6	"Fifty Years"	Fiona Banks	Christine Bartlett & Michael Lucas	June 19, 2019	351986-6	437,000
7	7	"Four Meats"	Peter Templeman	Christine Bartlett & Michael Lucas	June 26, 2019	351986-7	519,000
8	8	"One Bid"	Peter Templeman	Christine Bartlett & Michael Lucas	July 3, 2019	351986-8	476,000

=== Season 2 (2021) ===
No. overall	No. in season	Title	Directed by	Written by	Original release date	Prod. code
9	1	"Thirty Open Houses"	Peter Templeman	Christine Bartlett & Michael Lucas	11 August 2021	351986-10
10	2	"Two Mothers"	Peter Templeman	Christine Bartlett & Michael Lucas	11 August 2021	351986-9
11	3	"Nine Feet"	Shirley Barrett	Christine Bartlett & Michael Lucas	11 August 2021	351986-11
12	4	"Five Wishes"	Shirley Barrett	Mithila Gupta	11 August 2021	351986-12
13	5	"Two Warnings"	Fadia Abboud	Xavier Coy	11 August 2021	351986-13
14	6	"Twenty-Seven Weeks"	Fadia Abboud	Christine Bartlett & Michael Lucas	11 August 2021	351986-14
15	7	"Three Messages"	Peter Templeman	Christine Bartlett & Michael Lucas	11 August 2021	351986-15
16	8	"One Way"	Peter Templeman	Christine Bartlett & Michael Lucas	11 August 2021	351986-16

=== Season 3 (2022) ===
No. overall	No. in season	Title	Directed by	Written by	Original release date	Prod. code
17	1	"Zero Logic"	Peter Templeman	Christine Bartlett & Michael Lucas	1 January 2022	351986-17
18	2	"Three Teams"	Peter Templeman	Christine Bartlett & Michael Lucas	1 January 2022	351986-18
19	3	"Nine Carats"	Fiona Banks	Christine Bartlett & Michael Lucas	1 January 2022	351986-19
20	4	"One Kiss"	Fiona Banks	Christine Bartlett & Michael Lucas	1 January 2022	351986-20
21	5	"Four Memories"	Craig Irvin	Alisha Hnatjuk	1 January 2022	351986-21
22	6	"Three Dates"	Craig Irvin	Christine Bartlett & Michael Lucas	1 January 2022	351986-22
23	7	"Two Parties"	Peter Templeman	Christine Bartlett & Michael Lucas	1 January 2022	351986-23
24	8	"Two Words"	Peter Templeman	Christine Bartlett & Michael Lucas & Claire Phillips	1 January 2022	351986-24

=== Season 4 (2023) ===
No. overall	No. in season	Title	Directed by	Written by	Original release date	Prod. code
25	1	"Two Bluffs"	Peter Templeman	Christine Bartlett	14 May 2023	351986-25
26	2	"Two Battlers"	Peter Templeman	Christine Bartlett & Mithila Gupta	14 May 2023	351986-26
27	3	"Two Wills"	Fiona Banks	Alisha Hnayjuk	14 May 2023	351986-27
28	4	"Four Gummies"	Fiona Banks	Christine Bartlett	21 May 2023	351986-28
29	5	"Three Tents"	Adrian Chiarella	Christine Bartlett & Michael Lucas	28 May 2023	351986-29
30	6	"Seventy-Two Hours"	Adrian Chiarella	Christine Bartlett & Michael Lucas	4 June 2023	351986-30
31	7	"One Flame"	Peter Templeman	Christine Bartlett & Michael Lucas	11 June 2023	351986-31
32	8	"Five Sellers"	Peter Templeman	Christine Bartlett & Michael Lucas	18 June 2023	351986-32

== Production ==
In January 2019, it was announced Roy Joseph, Doris Younane, Katie Robertson, Kat Stewart, Stephen Peacocke, Kate Jenkinson and Hugh Sheridan had been cast in the new drama. In July 2021, it was announced that Rodger Corser would join the cast of the second season to guest star as Stuart, Liz's ex-husband. In October 2019, the drama was renewed for a second season by Network 10 which began filming in February 2020 before the production was closed down in March 2020 due to the COVID-19 pandemic. The second season's production resumed filming between June and July 2020. On 6 May 2021, it was announced the series moved to Paramount+, and that the second season premiered on 11 August 2021, coinciding with the Australian re-branding of 10 All Access to Paramount+. In October 2020, it was announced that a third season had been renewed which began filming in August 2021. It premiered on New Year's Day 2022. In May 2022, it was announced that a fourth season had been renewed which would begin filming in October 2022.

== International broadcast ==
Five Bedrooms was shown on BBC One from 10 March 2020, and was the fifth Australian drama to be broadcast on the BBC after Out of the Blue, The Doctor Blake Mysteries, A Place to Call Home and 800 Words since the broadcasting rights of Neighbours went to Channel 5 in 2008. Five Bedrooms had only the two seasons released on Peacock in the United States. It was also shown on RTP2 in Portugal and began airing on W Network in Canada in 2021. It began airing on RTÉ2 in the Republic of Ireland in July 2021, season two aired from November 2021 and season three from July 2022. May 2023 season 2 on Dutch television Net5. It's shown on TVNZ in New Zealand. July 2026, it's shown on Arte TV in France and Germany.

== Ratings ==
=== Season 1 ===
No.	Title	Air date	Overnight ratings		Consolidated ratings		Total viewers	Ref(s)
No.	Title	Air date	Viewers	Rank	Viewers	Rank	Total viewers	Ref(s)
1	"Five Owners"	15 May 2019	507,000	16	114,000	12	621,000	
2	"Twenty Guests"	22 May 2019	428,000	17	154,000	14	582,000	
3	"Three Millimetres"	29 May 2019	483,000	17	146,000	12	629,000	
4	"Zero Dollars"	5 June 2019	347,000	20	64,000	19	411,000	
5	"Five Lies"	12 June 2019	499,000	14	150,000	10	649,000	
6	"Fifty Years"	19 June 2019	437,000	16	168,000	13	605,000	
7	"Four Meats"	26 June 2019	519,000	14	159,000	10	678,000	
8	"One Bid"	3 July 2019	475,000	15	119,000	13	594,000	
