= Hi-5 (British TV series) =

British children's television series

- Genre: Children's Edutainment
- Created by: Helena Harris; Posie Graeme-Evans
- Based on: Hi-5
- Presented by: Chris Edgerley; Jenny Jones; Emma Nowell; Luke Roberts; Cat Sandion
- Theme music composer: Chris Harriott
- Opening theme: "Hi-5 Theme"
- Ending theme: "Hi-5 Closing Theme"
- Composer: Chris Harriott
- Country of origin: United Kingdom
- Original language: English
- No. of series: 1
- No. of episodes: 40

Production
- Production locations: London, UK
- Running time: 30 minutes (No ads)
- Production companies: Darrall Macqueen Ltd; Nine Films and Television; Southern Star Group

Original release
- Network: Cartoonito; ITV (CITV)
- Release: 3 November – 26 December 2008

Hi-5 (also known as Hi-5 UK) is a British children's television programme, based on the Australian children's TV series of the same name, which was premiered on Cartoonito and CITV on 3 November 2008.

== Format ==
Hi-5 is a variety-style series for preschoolers which features music as an integral part of its premise. The programme features five presenters who are collectively known as Hi-5, and perform songs as a group as well as presenting individual segments.

The Puzzles and Patterns segment has a focus on logical thinking and mathematics, with a puppet named Jup Jup used as a tool for the presenter to complete puzzles or solve problems. The presenter of Body Move encourages children to participate in movement and dance, developing physical coordination and motor development. Linguistics and aural skills are at the centre of the Word Play segment, featuring a puppet named Chatterbox who assists in the exploration of language through stories and rhymes. Shapes in Space focuses on visual and spatial awareness, with the presenter exploring shapes, colour, and everyday materials such as boxes and playdough. Musicality is explored through Making Music, with an emphasis on pitch, rhythm, beat, melody, and using a variety of real and pretend instruments. The final segment in which the cast comes together is entitled Sharing Stories, where a story is told that explores interpersonal relationships and emotions. The episodes are opened and bookended with a Song of the Week; a pop-style feature song which corresponds with the weekly theme and sets an educational topic for the week's episodes.

== Cast ==
=== Presenters ===
- Chris Edgerley – Making Music
- Jenny Jones – Body Move
- Emma Nowell – Word Play
- Luke Roberts – Shapes in Space
- Cat Sandion – Puzzles and Patterns

== Episodes ==
No.	Title	Song of the Week	Theme	Original release date
1	"People in Your Family"	Give Five	Family	3 November 2008
2	"Members of the Family"	Give Five	Family	4 November 2008
3	"Different Generation"	Give Five	Family	5 November 2008
4	"Jobs"	Give Five	Family	6 November 2008
5	"Working Together"	Give Five	Family	7 November 2008
6	"Someone Else"	I Can Go Anywhere	Pretend	10 November 2008
7	"Pretend to Be Animals"	I Can Go Anywhere	Pretend	11 November 2008
8	"Something Else"	I Can Go Anywhere	Pretend	12 November 2008
9	"Adventure"	I Can Go Anywhere	Pretend	13 November 2008
10	"Fantastical Pretending"	I Can Go Anywhere	Pretend	14 November 2008
11	"Jungle Animals"	So Many Animals	Animals	17 November 2008
12	"Insects"	So Many Animals	Animals	18 November 2008
13	"Farm Animals"	So Many Animals	Animals	19 November 2008
14	"Water Animals"	So Many Animals	Animals	20 November 2008
15	"Pets"	So Many Animals	Animals	21 November 2008
16	"Differences and Similarities"	Friends	Friends	24 November 2008
17	"Sharing and Caring"	Friends	Friends	25 November 2008
18	"Unusual Friends"	Friends	Friends	26 November 2008
19	"Making New Friends"	Friends	Friends	27 November 2008
20	"Fun with Friends"	Friends	Friends	28 November 2008
21	"Music from Around the World"	Feel the Beat	Music	1 December 2008
22	"Styles of Music"	Feel the Beat	Music	2 December 2008
23	"Instruments"	Feel the Beat	Music	3 December 2008
24	"Dancing"	Feel the Beat	Music	4 December 2008
25	"Silly Music"	Feel the Beat	Music	5 December 2008
26	"Seeing"	Five Senses	Senses	8 December 2008
27	"Hearing"	Five Senses	Senses	9 December 2008
28	"Smelling"	Five Senses	Senses	10 December 2008
29	"Touching"	Five Senses	Senses	11 December 2008
30	"Tasting"	Five Senses	Senses	12 December 2008
31	"The World"	Living in a Rainbow	Colours	15 December 2008
32	"Your World"	Living in a Rainbow	Colours	16 December 2008
33	"Making and Mixing"	Living in a Rainbow	Colours	17 December 2008
34	"Favourites and Feelings"	Living in a Rainbow	Colours	18 December 2008
35	"Wonderful"	Living in a Rainbow	Colours	19 December 2008
36	"Feeling Free"	Feelings	Feelings	22 December 2008
37	"Inside Me"	Feelings	Feelings	23 December 2008
38	"Feelings We Have"	Feelings	Feelings	24 December 2008
39	"Showing Our Feelings"	Feelings	Feelings	25 December 2008
40	"Animal Feelings"	Feelings	Feelings	26 December 2008

== Development ==
Turner Broadcasting System Europe commissioned a UK version of Hi-5 in April 2008 under a deal with Australian entertainment group Southern Star, with Darrall Macqueen set to produce the series. Cartoonito would air the series later on in the year, while GMTV would air it in 2009. In October, it was announced that the series would be part of GMTV's "Fluffy Club" strand.

== Concert tours ==
List of concerts performed by Hi-5
Year	Tour	Country	State / Region	Date	Venue
2009	Hi-5 Surprise!	United Kingdom	Bradford	4 October 2009	St. George's Hall
2009	Hi-5 Surprise!	United Kingdom	Bristol	6 October 2009	Colston Hall
2009	Hi-5 Surprise!	United Kingdom	Sheffield	8 October 2009	Sheffield City Hall
2009	Hi-5 Surprise!	United Kingdom	Oxford	10 October 2009	New Theatre Oxford
2009	Hi-5 Surprise!	United Kingdom	Cardiff	11 October 2009	St. David's Hall
2009	Hi-5 Surprise!	United Kingdom	Stoke-on-Trent	23 October 2009	Victoria Hall
2009	Hi-5 Surprise!	United Kingdom	Halifax	25 October 2009	Victoria Theatre
2009	Hi-5 Surprise!	United Kingdom	Liverpool	26 October 2009	Liverpool Empire Theatre
2009	Hi-5 Surprise!	United Kingdom	Brighton	28 October 2009	Brighton Centre
2009	Hi-5 Surprise!	United Kingdom	Croydon	1 November 2009	Fairfield Halls
2009	Hi-5 Surprise!	United Kingdom	Folkestone	7 November 2009	Leas Cliff Hall
2009	Hi-5 Surprise!	United Kingdom	Westcliff-on-Sea	8 November 2009	Cliffs Pavilion
2009	Hi-5 Surprise!	United Kingdom	London	11 November 2009	Hammersmith Apollo
2009	Hi-5 Surprise!	United Kingdom	Belfast	14 November 2009	Ulster Hall
2009	Hi-5 Surprise!	Ireland	Dublin	15 November 2009	The Helix
2009	Hi-5 Surprise!	United Kingdom	Ipswich	18 November 2009	Regent Theatre
2009	Hi-5 Surprise!	Ireland	Castlebar	19 November 2009	Royal Theatre
2009	Hi-5 Surprise!	Ireland	Killarney	20 November 2009	Gleneagle INEC Arena
2009	Hi-5 Surprise!	United Kingdom	Grimsby	22 November 2009	Grimsby Auditorium
2009	Hi-5 Surprise!	United Kingdom	Manchester	23 November 2009	Palace Theatre
2009	Hi-5 Surprise!	United Kingdom	Southampton	25 November 2009	Southampton Guildhall
2009	Hi-5 Surprise!	United Kingdom	Dunfermline	28 November 2009	Alhambra Theatre
2009	Hi-5 Surprise!	United Kingdom	Cambridge	29 November 2009	Cambridge Corn Exchange
