= Doris Younane =

Australian actress

- Born: 25 February 1963 (age 63); Parramatta, New South Wales, Australia
- Occupation: Actress
- Years active: 1988–present

Doris Younane /juːˈneɪn/ (born 25 February 1963) is an Australian stage and screen actress notable for her role in McLeod's Daughters where she played Moira Doyle. She is of Lebanese descent.

== Career ==
Her roles include Titania in A Midsummer Night's Dream and Yola Fatoush in Heartbreak High. Younane played Moira Doyle in McLeod's Daughters. In the early seasons, she was a recurring cast member and in later seasons she became a regular cast member. Younane also performed some of the songs heard during the series.

In 2018 Younane was announced as part of the cast for the Channel 10 series Five Bedrooms, a comedy drama set in a shared house. Younane would play Heather Doyle. Younane appeared in all four seasons of the show.

In 2019 Younane was announced as part of the cast of ABC drama Frayed. Younane appeared in both series of the show.

In 2023 Younane appeared in The Clearing.

In 2024, Younane would appear in series 2 of Paramount+ series Last King of the Cross.

On 11 April 2025, Younane was named in the cast for the film Posthumous.

== Award nominations ==
Doris also received her first ever award nomination for her role in Five Bedrooms as Heather Doyle during the 2022 AACTA award nominations.

== Filmography ==
=== Film ===
| Year | Title | Role | Notes |
|---|---|---|---|
| 1988 | Evil Angels | Uncredited | Feature film |
| 1989 | Mortgage | Tina Dodd | Feature film |
| 1990 | Death in Brunswick | Carmel | Feature film |
| 1993 | The Heartbreak Kid | Evdokia | Feature film |
| 1994 | Resistance | Rosa | Feature film |
| 1998 | 13 Gantry Row | Penny | TV movie |
| 2003 | BlackJack: Murder Archive | Christine Ormond | TV movie |
| 2004 | BlackJack: Sweet Science | Christine Vallas | TV movie |
| 2005 | BlackJack: In the Money | Christine Vallas | TV movie |
| 2005 | BlackJack: Ace Point Game | Christine Vallas | TV movie |
| 2009 | The Combination | Mary | Feature film |
| 2019 | Measure for Measure | Karima | Feature film |
| 2026 | Posthumous | Brenda | Film |

=== Television ===
| Year | Title | Role | Notes | Ref |
|---|---|---|---|---|
| 1988 | Embassy | Kaliani | 1 episode | |
| 1992–93 | All Together Now | Sue Jacobs | 2 episodes | |
| 1993 | Phoenix | Roz Horton | 1 episode | |
| 1994 | Secrets | Kylie | 1 episode | |
| 1994 | Ocean Girl | Celia | 1 episode | |
| 1994–95 | Heartbreak High | Yola Fatoush | 52 episodes | |
| 1995 | Us and Them | Bernie | 13 episodes | |
| 1996 | G.P. | Caroline Deacon | 1 episode | |
| 1997 | Murder Call | Michelle Balzan | 1 episode | |
| 1998 | Wildside | Zelda O'Sullivan | 1 episode | |
| 1999 | Stingers | Lizzie Harper | 2 episodes | |
| 1999 | SeaChange | Elena Connors | 2 episodes | |
| 1999 | Chuck Finn | Natasha | 1 episode | |
| 2000 | Halifax f.p. | Emma Ford | 1 episode | |
| 2001 | Water Rats | Pam Elliot | 1 episode | |
| 2005 | All Saints | Carlene Ponder | 1 episode | |
| 2002–03; 2005–09 | McLeod's Daughters | Moira Doyle | 94 episodes | |
| 2009 | False Witness | Jenny Basheer | | |
| 2010 | Rake | Prosecution QC Ms Habib | 1 episode | |
| 2012 | Scratch | Allergist | Short | |
| 2014 | Fat Tony & Co. | Voula Papadopoulos | 2 episodes | |
| 2014 | Janet King | Magistrate Brenner | 1 episode | |
| 2014 | Party Tricks | Paula Doumani | 6 episodes | |
| 2016 | Wolf | Michelle | Short | |
| 2016 | Soul Mates | Hatshepsut | 4 episodes | |
| 2016–17 | The Wrong Girl | Sasha | 17 episodes | |
| 2018 | Harrow | Sue Latchford | 1 episode | |
| 2019 | Secret City | Jane | 1 episode | |
| 2019–2023 | Five Bedrooms | Heather | 32 episodes | |
| 2019–2021 | Frayed | Bev | 12 episodes | |
| 2023 | The Clearing | Christine | 8 episodes | |
| 2024 | Last King of the Cross | Wahiba Ibrahim | 5 episodes | |
| 2025 | Darby and Joan | Yvette | Guest: 1 episode | |
| 2025 | Apple Cider Vinegar | Dr. Chidiac | TV series: 4 episodes | |
| 2026 | The Killings at Parrish Station | Older Millie Farah | TV series: 6 episodes | |
