= Hi-5 (Indonesian TV series) =

- Genre: Preschool
- Based on: Hi-5 by Helena Harris; Posie Graeme-Evans
- Presented by: Cindya Ayu; Dewa Dayana; Alvin Lapian; Vabyra Mauriz; Claresta Ravenska
- Opening theme: "Hi-5 Theme" (sung in Indonesian)
- Ending theme: "Hi-5 Closing Theme" (sung in Indonesian)
- Composer: Chris Harriott
- Country of origin: Indonesia
- Original language: Indonesian
- No. of seasons: 1
- No. of episodes: 35

Production
- Executive producer: HB Naveen
- Production location: Jakarta
- Camera setup: Multi-camera
- Running time: 30 minutes
- Production company: Falcon Pictures (Note: Produced by Falcon Pictures under Falcon Kids label.)

Original release
- Network: Trans7
- Release: November 27, 2017 – January 26, 2018

Related
- Hi-5 (Australian TV series)

Hi-5 (also known as Hi-5 Indonesia) is an Indonesian television series produced by Falcon Pictures (through its Kids label) for Trans7. Based on the original Australian series of the same name, created by Helena Harris and Posie Graeme-Evans, the program is known for its educational content and pop music appeal, with the cast of the show known collectively as Hi-5. It has generated discussion about what is considered appropriate television for children in Indonesia. The series premiered on November 27, 2017 on Trans7.

The series is designed for a pre-school audience, featuring five performers who educate and entertain through play, movement and music, which is an integral part of the series. The segments of the show are based on an educational model. The cast is composed of Cindya Ayu, Dewa Dayana, Alvin Lapian, Vabyra Mauriz and Claresta Ravenska. The contract was approved by Falcon and Hi-5 Operations Pte. Ltd.

== Production ==
Due to the successful appeal of the original Australian group in Southeast Asia, it was announced in August 2017 that a local Indonesian series would be introduced. Falcon ordered 25 episodes featuring the Indonesian version of the group. In November 2017, it was announced that Trans7 became the series' original network.

== Music ==
The program uses music as an integral part of its concept, and like the original Australian group, the cast of the Indonesian series became a recognized musical group for children outside of the show, known collectively as Hi-5. The debut album of the group, Hi-5 Indonesia, corresponded with the series and was released in 2018.

== Cast ==
- Cindya Ayu – Puzzles and Patterns
- Dewa Dayana – Shapes in Space
- Alvin Lapian – Making Music
- Vabyra Mauriz – Word Play
- Claresta Ravenska – Body Move
