= Lyndon Woodside =

American conductor

Lyndon Woodside (March 23, 1935 in Florence, South Carolina – August 23, 2005 in Englewood, New Jersey) was the 10th conductor of the Oratorio Society of New York. He toured Europe and the Americas, but his home performance space was Carnegie Hall, built by Andrew Carnegie to house the Society. While his repertoire was broad, perhaps he was best known for the annual Christmas-time production of Handel's Messiah.

A resident of Leonia, New Jersey, he maintained his directorship until he died of pneumonia on August 23, 2005, in Englewood, New Jersey.
