= Rebecca Lavelle =

Australian musician and singer-songwriter (born 1980)

Bec Lavelle
- Born: Rebecca Anne Lavelle; 18 March 1980 (age 46); Maitland, New South Wales, Australia
- Genres: Pop/rock, folk
- Occupations: Musician, singer-songwriter
- Instrument: Vocals
- Years active: 2000–present
- Label: Edel

Bec Lavelle (born 18 March 1980 in Maitland) is an Australian musician and singer-songwriter. Lavelle provided lead vocals for songs on TV drama, McLeod's Daughters (2001–2009). The tracks are written by Posie Graeme-Evans and Chris Harriott. Lavelle appears on three soundtracks for the show, the first volume (26 August 2002) peaked at No. 8 on the ARIA Albums Chart and was certified platinum by ARIA for shipment of 70,000 units. The second volume (25 April 2004) reached No. 19 and was certified gold for 35,000 units shipped. She had an on screen guest role as Bindy Martin in October 2006 in an episode, "Old Wrongs". As a solo artist, Lavelle has issued four studio albums: Intimate Portrait (2007), Love & Bravery (2010), Kehr Wieder (2016) and IV (2020).

== Biography ==
Rebecca Anne Lavelle was born on 18 March 1980 in Maitland. Her parents are Mark Edward and Judy Anne Lavelle, and she has two younger sisters, Sarah and Rachael.

Lavelle started singing and dancing when she was three years old. She attended the Brent Street School of Performing Arts and graduated in 1999.

Lavelle had toured nationally as a solo artist before providing vocals for songs written by Posie Graeme-Evans and Chris Harriott for Australian TV drama, McLeod's Daughters (2001–2009). She provided lead vocals on three soundtracks for the show: volume 1 (26 August 2002) peaked at No. 8 on the ARIA Albums Chart and was certified platinum by ARIA for shipment of 70,000 units. Volume 2 (25 April 2004) reached No. 19 and was certified gold for shipment of 35,000 units. Lavelle made a guest appearance as Bindy Martin on 11 October 2006 in episode, "Old Wrongs". Volume 3 appeared on 1 September 2008 but it did not chart.

In December 2003 Lavelle appeared at the annual Carols by Candlelight at Sidney Myer Music Bowl, with proceeds donated to the Vision Australia charity, which was broadcast nationally on Network Nine. From 19 to 31 May 2005 she performed for Australian and allied forces in the Middle East including Iraq for Operation Catalyst alongside Adam and Mathew Hedditch (comedy duo, as Big Brother Little Brother), Tottie Goldsmith and the Australian Army Band Melbourne. From 13 to 23 March 2006 she performed on the Tour de Force to The Sinai and Cyprus with James Blundell and Wayne Deakin.

On 7 September 2007 Lavelle released her debut solo album, Intimate Portrait, in Germany through the Edel record label. She promoted the album with a European tour, especially in Germany. It peaked in the top 100 in both Switzerland and Germany. Her second album, Love & Bravery, appeared on 12 November 2010. In February 2011 Lavelle relocated to Hamburg, Germany.

Six years after her last album, she released new material, on 29 February 2016. Her third album was titled Kehr Wieder (in English: "(let's) recur"). Though the title of the record is in German, the songs are all in English.

== Discography ==
=== Studio albums ===
List of studio albums, with selected chart positions
Title	Album details	Peak chart positions	
Title	Album details	GER	SWI
Intimate Portrait	Released: September 2007; Label: Edel:Motion; Formats: CD, digital download	78	70
Love & Bravery	Released: November 2010; Label: Edel:Motion; Formats: CD, digital download	—	—
Kehr Wieder	Released: February 2016; Label: Red Rebel Music; Formats: CD, digital download, streaming	—	—
IV	Released: August 2020; Label: Red Rebel Music; Formats: CD, digital download, streaming	—	—

=== Soundtracks albums ===
List of soundtracks, with Australian chart positions and certifications shown
Title	Album details	Peak chart positions	Certification
Title	Album details	AUS	Certification
McLeod's Daughters: Songs from the Series Volume 1	Released: 26 August 2002; Label: Columbia, Nine Network Australia, Millennium Television; Formats: CD	8	ARIA: Platinum
McLeod's Daughters: Songs from the Series Volume 2	Released: 25 April 2004; Label: Columbia, Nine Network Australia, Millennium Television; Formats: CD	19	ARIA: Gold
McLeod's Daughters: Songs from the Series Volume 3	Released: 1 September 2008; Label: Sony BMG Music Entertainment; Formats: CD, DD	—	

== External sources ==
- Official Rebecca Lavelle Site archived here on 10 October 2008.
- Official Rebecca Lavelle Site
- Rebecca Lavelle at AllMusic
- Rebecca Lavelle at IMDb
