= Give me five =

Give me five or Gimme five is a phrase that often precedes a low five or a high five hand gesture.

It may also refer to:

== TV and online ==
- Gimme 5 (TV series) (1992–1994), a British children's television programme
- Gimme 5: Laro ng mga Henyo

== Music ==
- Gimme 5 (group), a Filipino boy group
- Gimme Five (album), an album by The Killjoys
- "Give Me Five!" (song) (2012), a music single by the Japanese girl idol group AKB48
- Give Me Five, an album by Buck Trent
