= High Five (Columbus, Ohio) =

- Founder: John Angelo
- Location: Columbus, OH

High Five was a 2010 marketing effort to create a national identity for Columbus, Ohio by linking five districts along 5 miles (8.0 km) of historic High Street.

== Districts ==
=== University District ===
The Ohio State University has one of the largest campuses in the US. The district houses 50,000 students and provides sporting events, festivals, concerts and night life.

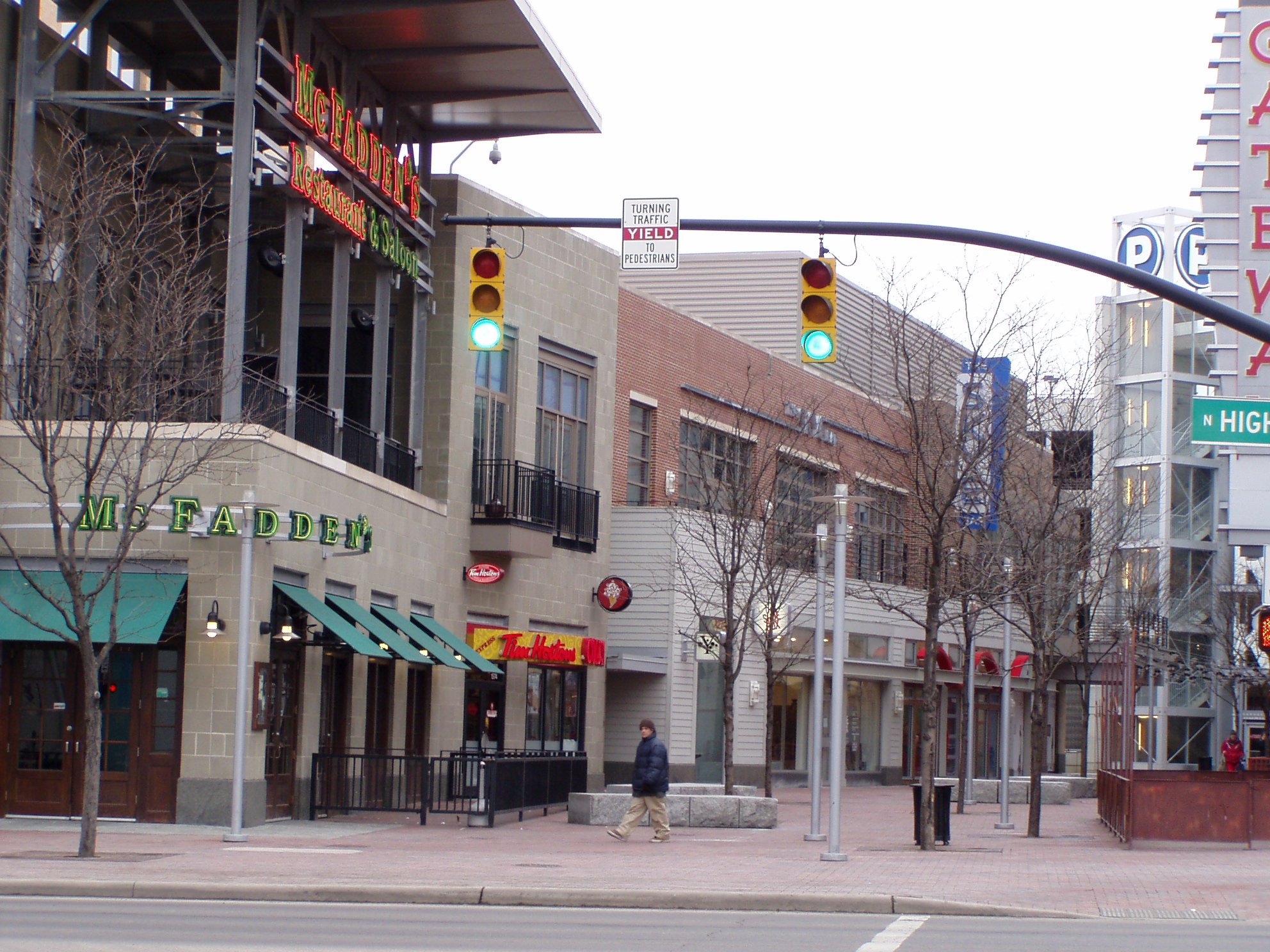
South Campus Gateway

=== Short North ===
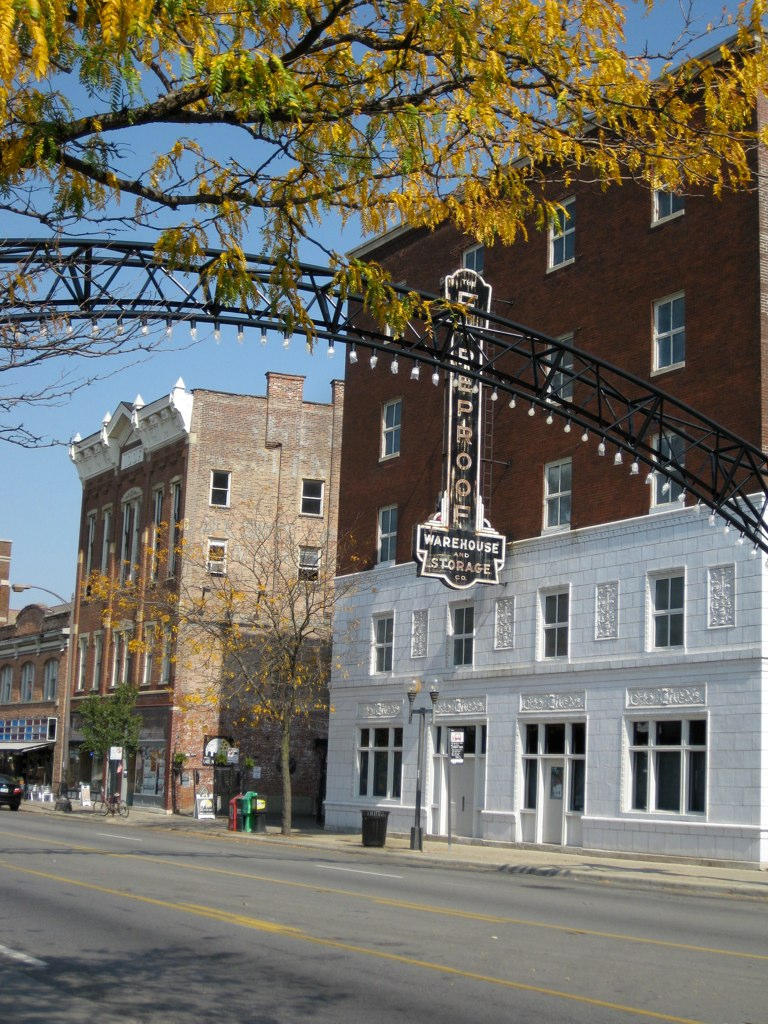
Arches stretch the street in the Short North

The Short North is a collection of galleries, restaurants, and boutiques. This district features historic architecture, including arches lining the street.

=== Arena District ===
The Arena District is a 75 acres (0.30 km^{2}) development project that is contains housing and restaurants, along with concert and sporting venues. The district hosts the Columbus Blue Jackets at Nationwide Arena and the Columbus Clippers at Huntington Park.

=== Downtown ===
The Ohio Statehouse and the headquarters of multiple industries are located downtown, including Huntington Bank and Nationwide Insurance. Downtown also has parks such as Columbus Commons and the Scioto Mile, and historic theaters.

=== German Village ===
German Village is a historic neighborhood south of Downtown Columbus.
