= High 5 Tickets to the Arts =

High 5 Tickets to the Arts is a non-profit organization aimed at introducing New York City high school students to the arts. Through partnerships with major corporations, it offers student tickets to music, theater, and dance performances for a nominal fee of five dollars or less. Museum passes are also available. Tickets are donated by the venue and, provided they are not sold to students, become public on the day of the event. Tickets can be purchased online or in person and picked up at the box office with valid student identification.

Major supporters of High 5 include the Carnegie Corporation, Bloomberg, Citigroup, the New York Observer, and the Bank of America.

== History ==
High 5 was founded in 1993, as a collaboration between staff of the American Symphony Orchestra (Eugene Carr and Kathleen Drohan), the New York Times (Jeanne Shanley and Sharon Yakata), and Ticketmaster (Marla Hoicowitz and Connie Fitzgerald). In 1995, High 5 appointed its first full-time executive director, Ada Ciniglio, and was incorporated as a non-profit organization. In the late 1990s, it founded the Take 5 program, in which an adult can take five teenagers to a performance, the adult's ticket being free. In 2006, High 5 sold its 105,000 tickets.

== Notable performances ==
High 5 does not routinely sell tickets to Broadway Shows. When it does, tickets are sold very quickly. Some current and former High 5 events include:

- American Symphony Orchestra
- Apollo Theater
- Rent
- New York Philharmonic
- Blue Man Group
- Museum of Modern Art
