= Hi-5 (Australian TV series) =

Australian TV series

- Genre: Preschool
- Created by: Helena Harris; Posie Graeme-Evans
- Opening theme: "Hi-5 Theme"
- Ending theme: "Hi-5 Closing Theme"
- Composer: Chris Harriott
- Country of origin: Australia
- Original language: English
- No. of series: 14
- No. of episodes: 595 (list of episodes)

Production
- Executive producers: Various: Kris Noble (1999–2002); Helena Harris (2003–2008); Noel Price (2009–2011); Julie Greene (2017)
- Production locations: Various: TCN-9; Global Television; Fox Studios (2008); ABC Studios (2009–2011); Pinewood Iskandar Malaysia Studios (2017)
- Camera setup: Multicamera
- Running time: 30 minutes
- Production companies: Kids Like Us (1999–2008); Southern Star (2009–2011); Nine Films and Television

Original release
- Network: Nine Network
- Release: 12 April 1999 – 16 December 2011
- Network: 9Go!
- Release: 15 May – 16 June 2017

Related
- Hi-5 House

Hi-5 is an Australian children's television series, originally produced by Kids Like Us and later Southern Star for the Nine Network, created by Helena Harris and Posie Graeme-Evans. The program is known for its educational content, and for the cast of the program, who became a recognised musical group for children outside of the series, known collectively as Hi-5. It has generated discussion about what is considered appropriate television for children. The series premiered on 12 April 1999 on the Nine Network.

The series is designed for a pre-school audience, featuring five performers who educate and entertain through play, movement and music, which is an integral part of the series. The segments of the show are based on an educational model. The original cast was composed of Kellie Crawford, Kathleen de Leon Jones, Nathan Foley, Tim Harding and Charli Robinson. By the end of 2008, this line-up had been completely phased out and replaced with a new group of performers. Hi-5 received three Logie Television Awards for Most Outstanding Children's Program.

Harris and Graeme-Evans ended their involvement with the series in 2008 when the program was sold to Southern Star and the Nine Network. The final episode of Hi-5 aired on 16 December 2011 as a result of the Nine Network selling the property in 2012. A spin-off series, Hi-5 House, aired on Nick Jr. from 2013 to 2016, produced with no involvement from Nine. The network renewed its partnership with the brand in October 2016 and produced a revived series with a new cast, which aired on 9Go! in 2017.

== Format ==
Hi-5 is a variety-style series for preschoolers which features music as an integral part of its premise. Aimed at children aged between two and eight, the series incorporates educational trends with a pop music appeal, using song and movement to capture the attention of children. The series employs central themes of exploration and discovery, providing children with an opportunity for a "sensitive exploration of their world". Hi-5 encourages children to "take a joyous and active part in life", with active participation encouraged. The program features five presenters who are collectively known as Hi-5, and perform songs as a group as well as presenting individual segments. All segments are integrated with music as a tool to highlight the key concepts of each episode.

The Shapes in Space segment focuses on visual and spatial awareness, with the presenter exploring shapes, colour, and everyday materials such as boxes and playdough. Musicality is explored through Making Music, with an emphasis on pitch, rhythm, beat, melody, and using a variety of real and pretend instruments. The presenter of Body Move encourages children to participate in movement and dance, developing physical coordination and motor development. Linguistics and aural skills are at the centre of the Word Play segment, featuring a puppet named Chatterbox who assists in the exploration of language through stories and rhymes. Puzzles and Patterns has a focus on logical thinking and mathematics, with a puppet named Jup Jup used as a tool for the presenter to complete puzzles or solve problems.

The final segment in which the cast comes together is entitled Sharing Stories, where a story is told that explores interpersonal relationships and emotions. The episodes begin and end with a Song of the Week; a pop-style feature song which corresponds with the weekly theme and sets an educational topic for the week's episodes.

The 2017 revived series featured new puppet characters, the Jupsters, who were introduced as the family of previously established character Jup Jup. The revival also retained a segment introduced in Hi-5 House, entitled The Chatterbox. This segment focuses on the discovery of language through simple words and phrases, and features the puppet Chatterbox, who teaches a toy robot named Tinka (Ellen Wright-Folan) how to speak.

== Production ==
=== Conception ===
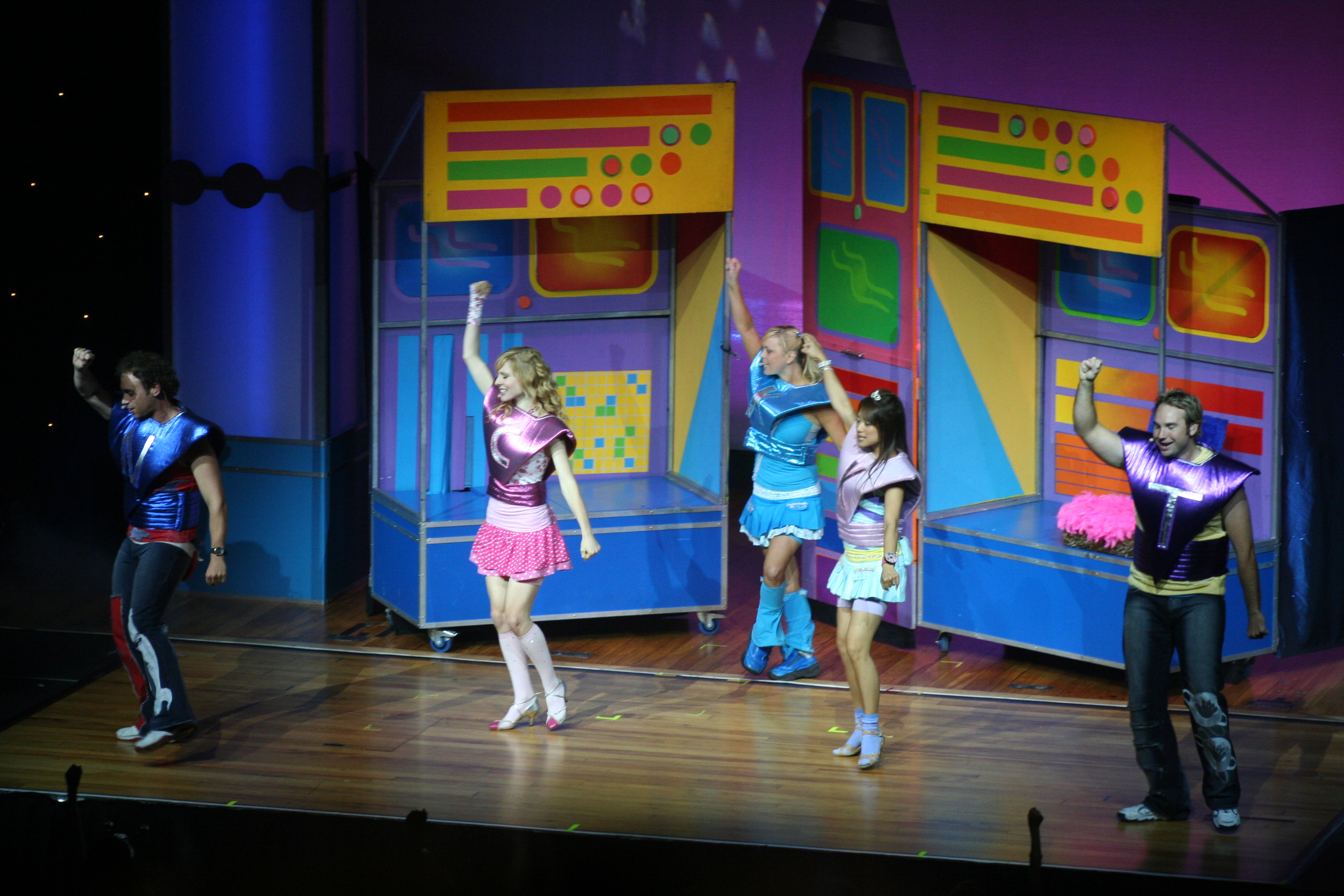
Original cast, 2006 L–R: Nathan Foley, Charli Robinson, Kellie Crawford, Kathleen de Leon Jones and Tim Harding.

Hi-5 was created in 1998 by television producer Helena Harris, who had worked on Bananas in Pyjamas. She and co-producer Posie Graeme-Evans (The Miraculous Mellops, Mirror, Mirror) developed the series as preschool entertainment. The name of the series was derived from the high five gesture.

Harris stated that her inspiration for Hi-5 came partly from living in England, where she realised that children are the same around the world, and expected the show would appeal universally, with accessible themes such as family and animals. Harris strove to incorporate items of current interest to engage with the children and keep them interested in the show. The creators saw the need for "life-affirming" television for rapidly maturing preschoolers, and found that most children learned from shows which incorporated movement and song. The creators believed pre-schoolers have matured beyond programs such as Here's Humphrey.

The series was pitched to Nine Network executives in November 1997 through Harris and Graeme-Evans' joint independent production company, Kids Like Us. The concept was picked up by the network within days of being pitched, and a pilot was officially ordered after two weeks. Harris stated that the network's enthusiasm for the show emanated from the executives' young children. A pilot was filmed in mid-1998, which was shown to a test audience. No changes were made to the format after the test. After being commissioned, the first full series began production in October, and had concluded by December. The Nine Network initially signed a co-venture with Kids Like Us to produce two 45-episode series of the show and the first went to air on Nine on 12 April 1999. Hi-5 was granted a P classification, deeming it specifically designed to meet the needs and interests of pre-schoolers and allowing it to be broadcast on the Nine Network with a 30-minute runtime commercial-free. The first series was produced for US$20,000 to US$30,000 for each episode. A fashion line for children, based on the costuming featured on the program, was released alongside the premiere of the show. Graeme-Evans only served as a co-producer for the first two series.

=== Development ===
Hi-5 received a total of three Logie Television Awards, two for Most Outstanding Children's Program in 2000 and 2001 and one for Most Outstanding Children's Preschool Program in 2004. In 2005, it was stated that one episode would cost an estimated A$50,000 to produce, and that a feature film was in early development. The 300th episode of Hi-5 was celebrated in 2005. Harris stated that by 2007, "Hi-5 [was] still evolving and maintaining its relevance and freshness". Nine reportedly signed a two-year deal with the producers in 2007. The Hi-5 brand was purchased by the Nine Network, along with production company Southern Star, in March 2008, from previous owners Harris and Graeme-Evans. Robinson recalled that she had tried to depart from the programme after eight years but producers convinced her stay, and that the following years working on the show were her favourite.

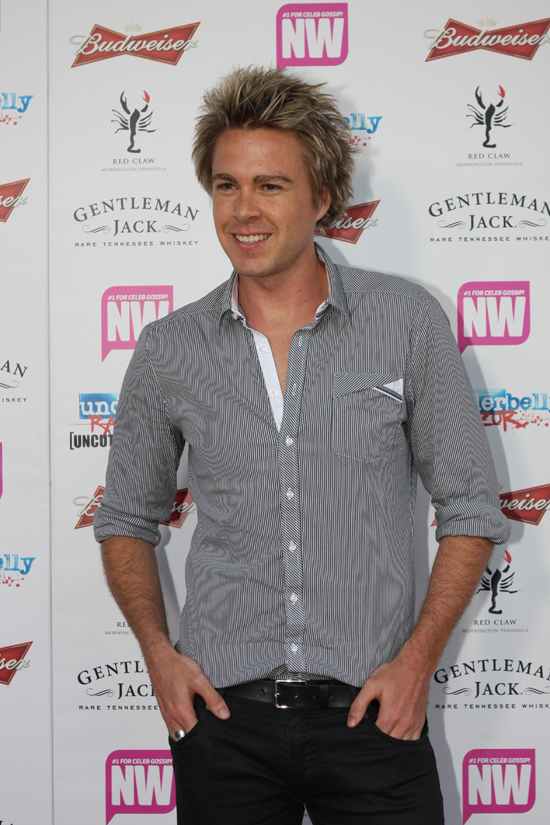
Stevie Nicholson, Surry Hills, November 2011

Nine committed to five new series of Hi-5 in 2009 with a new generation cast, to be aired until 2013. However, only three of these planned series were produced. The eleventh series debuted on 31 August 2009. Brand directors Martin Hersov and Cathy Payne said "we're very excited to be launching the next phase of Hi-5". Of the cast change, executive producer Noel Price stated that Hi-5 was designed so that its popularity would not solely rely on the appeal of cast members as individuals. The 500th episode of Hi-5 was celebrated in 2010 during the twelfth series. By this series, Price stated the producers aimed to recreate the success of the earlier episodes by "captur[ing] that earlier innocence". The thirteenth and final series of the original Hi-5 premiered on 17 October 2011, in which the program's musical history was recognised by reintroducing previous songs to a new generation of fans.

=== Cancellation ===
In June 2012, the Nine Network sold the Hi-5 brand in its entirety to Asian equity group, Asiasons, following Nine's reported financial difficulties. Hi-5 would no longer be produced by Nine, and therefore, the thirteenth series became the last. A spin-off series entitled Hi-5 House was created under new management to continue the Hi-5 concept. The new series was produced independently from Nine and aired on Nick Jr. from 2013 to 2016.

=== Revival ===
The Nine Network renewed its partnership with the Hi-5 franchise in October 2016 and announced its plans to revive Hi-5 with a new cast in 2017. Executive producer Julie Greene stated "we're really excited to be working with Nine to develop a reinvigorated Hi-5 show". The revival would feature a new cast and set, but retain the original team of producers and writers. CEO of Nine Entertainment, Hugh Marks, revealed his role in the program's reintroduction, citing his belief that the series would still be relevant in an updated climate, while expecting significantly lower viewership. After auditions were held in November 2016, the new cast was revealed in December. The series began production in January 2017 and premiered on Nine's multichannel, 9Go!, on 15 May. A second series of the revival was planned for 2018, before filming was halted and the Australian production office was closed.

== Educational theory ==
Hi-5 was designed by educational experts to appeal to contemporary, "media-literate" children by relating to their world. The series has been described as "for the kids of today". The cast are presented as older siblings to the children, educating the audience in a fun and entertaining way, through "play based learning", rather than appearing as adults who are teaching them. The educational theories of the series are disguised with music and entertainment, with the multiple layers of the show catering for a wide range of ages in the audience, while being primarily aimed at those aged 2–8. The real-life messages of the show are reinforced in an entertaining way.

Harris and Graeme-Evans based the series around an underlying educational structure, primarily using Howard Gardner's theory of multiple intelligences. It is recognised that each child learns in a different way, and each cast member has a specific segment within the show which targets a different aspect of learning, ranging from logical-mathematical thinking to a focus on linguistic skills, to cater to a child's individual learning approach. Harris observed that most viewers had a favourite cast member, believing that children generally "respond more favourably to the presenter who models the learning style they prefer". The use of multiple segments is also designed to hold the attention span of young children. The skills of pre-numeracy and pre-literacy are a focus of the educational theory, to prepare children for learning at school, while also encouraging self-confidence and expression. According to the show's website, Hi-5 also uses Piaget's theory of cognitive development, providing a learning experience that promotes individual growth.

Music and movement play a large part integrating the elements of Hi-5 together, with music reinforcing the central ideas which the series presents, while also being entertaining. Physical interaction is encouraged, and heavily featured to make the show relatively fast-paced, originally to replicate the energy of contemporary music videos. Dancing is featured, with a focus on movements that increase the integration between the left and right sides of the brain.

== Cast ==
The program features five presenters who are known collectively as Hi-5. The cast became a recognised musical group for children, outside of the television program.

=== Original series (1999–2011) ===
- Kellie Crawford (Series 1–10)
- Kathleen de Leon Jones (Series 1–8) (Note: de Leon Jones made three guest appearances in Series 9.)
- Nathan Foley (Series 1–10)
- Tim Harding (Series 1–9)
- Charli Robinson (Series 1–10)
- Sun Park (Series 9–10)
- Stevie Nicholson (Series 10–13)
- Lauren Brant (Series 11–13)
- Casey Burgess (Series 11–13)
- Fely Irvine (Series 11–13)
- Tim Maddren (Series 11–13)

=== Revived series (2017) ===
- Courtney Clarke (Series 1)
- Shay Clifford (Series 1)
- Lachie Dearing (Series 1)
- Joe Kalou (Series 1)
- Bailey Spalding (Series 1)

== Episodes ==
=== Original series ===
Series	Episodes	Originally released	
Series	Episodes	First released	Last released
1	45	12 April 1999	11 June 1999
2	45	17 April 2000	16 June 2000
3	45	11 June 2001	10 August 2001
4	45	1 July 2002	30 August 2002
5	45	8 September 2003	7 November 2003
6	30	18 October 2004	26 November 2004
7	45	23 May 2005	22 July 2005
8	45	12 June 2006	11 August 2006
9	45	11 June 2007	10 August 2007
10	45	7 July 2008	5 September 2008
11	45	31 August 2009	30 October 2009
12	45	13 September 2010	12 November 2010
13	45	17 October 2011	16 December 2011

=== Revived series ===
Series	Episodes	Originally released	
Series	Episodes	First released	Last released
1	25	15 May 2017	16 June 2017

== Reception ==
=== Viewership ===
The first series of Hi-5 was broadcast in 1999 and quadrupled the ratings and audience share in its timeslot, previously occupied by programs including Here's Humphrey. Hi-5 averaged a national audience of 223,000 in 1999, which was a 32.2% increase on Humphrey. The first four weeks of broadcast achieved an average of 231,000 viewers.

Hi-5's highest rating episode in 2001 was watched by 96,000 children aged 0–14. In 2005, Hi-5 was one of the top ten children's programs (classified C or P) on commercial television in the 0–14 age group. Its average audience was 60,000 in this bracket. It was the highest rating P program in the 0–4 age group, receiving an average viewership of 39,000.

An October 2010 screening of an episode received 314,000 viewers.

Hi-5 was consistently the highest rating program on Disney Junior Asia from its premiere in 2012 until 2016.

In Australia, the premiere run of the Hi-5 revival in 2017 averaged a viewership of 10,000.

=== Critical reception ===
The series received generally positive reviews. Hi-5 was described by US magazine Kidscreen as a "combination of Spice Girls-esque musical performances and Sesame Street educational content". The cast's performance was described by Sally Murphy of Aussiereviews.com as "bright, full of music and catchy tunes," with the original line-up praised by the website's Magdalena Ball for their "consistent camaraderie, [and] varied and well coordinated talent as singers, performers, and dancers." Ball credited their appeal to the members being positive role models.

The program has generated debate about what is considered appropriate television for children. In a 2011 survey by the Australian Council on Children and the Media (ACCM), Hi-5 was identified by parents as a "controversial program", eliciting both positive and negative evaluations about its quality. Some surveyed parents expressed concern that the clothes and costuming of the cast was inappropriate for a young audience, and labelled it as "premature sexualisation". However, in 2002, Harris stated that the producers were very careful about addressing body image issues and keeping the cast "concealed", believing Hi-5 helped to influence appropriate fashion in young people.

Joly Herman of Common Sense Media questioned the quality and consistency of the program's educational material, noting the use of music as "arbitrary". On the contrary, a sample of parents in the ACCM survey praised Hi-5, listing it as an example of a musical program which is not "coupled with commercialism".

== Release ==
=== Broadcast ===
The first series of Hi-5 was sold to New Zealand and Singapore. In 2000, there were expression of interests from the United Kingdom, Canada, Germany, Israel and South Africa. The TV series had a successful premiere in the UK on Channel 5's children's programming strand Milkshake! in early 2003. Initially, Harris expected that the series would become formatted into international versions, however, she was so confident with the original cast that the Australian series was sold overseas instead. On pay-TV in Australia, Hi-5 premiered on Nick Jr. in 2003. The programme debuted in the United States for the first time in 2014, with episodes featuring the original cast premiering on KCET.

The 2017 revival series was released on online streaming service Stan on 1 October 2017.

=== Home video ===
Compilation home video releases of Hi-5 have been distributed on VHS and DVD in Australia by Roadshow Entertainment.

== Other media ==
=== Music ===
With the television series using music as an integral part of its concept, the cast of the series became a recognised musical group for children outside of the show. The debut album of the group, Jump and Jive with Hi-5, corresponded with the first series of the show and was released in September 1999 by Sony Music, reaching No. 33 on the ARIA Albums Chart. The group performed at venues such as the Newcastle Civic Theatre in their first year. Hi-5 won five consecutive ARIA Awards for Best Children's Album, their albums received multiple sale accreditations, and four releases reached the top 10 on the ARIA Albums Chart. The group also toured nationally every year, with sell-out national tours of their early stage shows, in venues such as the Sydney Opera House. In 2001, the group members said they did not expect that Hi-5 would become so successful; Robinson explained it was not until they went on tour that they realised their popularity.

The music of the show has a distinguishable pop music sound, being described as "pop for kids" by Crawford in 2001 and Foley in 2004. Chris Harriott is the primary composer of the show, having written thousands of Hi-5 songs (including feature songs of the week and shorter songlets) thus creating a sense of musical consistency. Graeme-Evans and Harriott had worked together when he scored the theme for the teen drama series, Mirror, Mirror (1995). He had previously worked with Harris as a composer on Bananas in Pyjamas; and had individually worked in Australian theatre. He was originally approached by the creators with the task of writing top ten songs for an age range of 2–6. Robinson said members were encouraged to write their own music for the group, and as of 2015, she was still receiving occasional royalty cheques for her work.

=== Spin-off series ===
In 2013, a spin-off series entitled Hi-5 House was created under new management to continue the Hi-5 concept with a refreshed appeal. The new series remained similar to the original concept, but featured a new setting; a house in which the cast members would live and present the show. The Nine Network were not involved in the follow-up series. The series premiered on Nick Jr. on 4 November 2013, and ran until 2016.

=== International versions ===
The international appeal of Hi-5 has led to successful local versions of the television series. In 2002, an American Hi-5 series was created, airing from 2003 to 2006 on TLC and Discovery Kids, also being nominated for a Daytime Emmy in 2005, 2006, and 2007. A UK series aired on Cartoonito in 2008. After Hi-5's sale in 2012, there was a return to licensing international versions of the program. A Latin American series entitled Hi-5 Fiesta aired from 2014 to 2016 on Discovery Kids, followed by a local version for the Philippines airing over 2015 and 2016, and the debut of an Indonesian series in 2017.

== Awards and nominations ==
List of awards and nominations received by Hi-5
Award	Year	Recipient(s) and nominee(s)	Category	Result	Ref.
ADVIA Awards	2006	Action Heroes	Best DVD Marketing Campaign	Won	
APRA Screen Music Awards	2002	Chris Harriott, Lisa Hoppe, Chris Phillips (for "Opposites Attract")	Best Music for Children's Television	Nominated	
APRA Screen Music Awards	2002	Chris Harriott, Various (for songlets)	Best Music for Children's Television	Nominated	
APRA Screen Music Awards	2003	Chris Harriott, Lisa Hoppe (for "Celebrate")	Best Music for Children's Television	Nominated	
APRA Screen Music Awards	2005	Chris Harriott, Leone Carey (for "Making Music")	Best Original Song Composed for a Feature Film, Telemovie, TV Series or Mini-Series	Nominated	
Asian Academy Creative Awards	2018	Hi-5 (for "Vehicles")	Best Children's Entertainment or Drama	Won	
Asian Academy Creative Awards	2018	Hi-5 (for "Cultural Festivals")	Best Preschool Programme	Won	
Asian Television Awards	2007	Hi-5	Best Children's Programme	Runner-up	
Asian Television Awards	2010	Hi-5	Best Children's Programme	Nominated	
Asian Television Awards	2017	Hi-5	Best Preschool Programme	Won	
Logie Awards	2000	Hi-5	Most Outstanding Children's Program	Won	
Logie Awards	2001	Hi-5	Most Outstanding Children's Program	Won (Tied) (Note: Hi-5 was tied with Round the Twist.)	
Logie Awards	2002	Hi-5	Most Outstanding Children's Program	Nominated	
Logie Awards	2003	Hi-5	Most Outstanding Children's Program	Nominated	
Logie Awards	2004	Hi-5	Most Outstanding Children's Preschool Program	Won	
Logie Awards	2005	Hi-5	Most Outstanding Children's Program	Nominated	
Logie Awards	2006	Hi-5	Most Outstanding Children's Program	Nominated	
Logie Awards	2008	Hi-5	Most Outstanding Children's Program	Nominated	
Logie Awards	2010	Hi-5	Most Outstanding Children's Program	Nominated	
Logie Awards	2011	Hi-5	Most Outstanding Children's Program	Nominated	

== See also ==
- List of longest-running Australian television series
