= Posie Graeme-Evans =

Australian writer and film and television director

- Born: 1952 (age 73–74); Nottingham, England
- Occupations: Novelist; producer; editor; screenwriter; director
- Spouse: Andrew Blaxland
- Children: 3
- Writing career
- Notable works: "The Innocent" 2003, "The Exiled" 2005, "The Beloved" 2006 (trilogy); "The Dressmaker" 2010; "The Island House" 2012; "Wild Wood" 2015
- Notable awards: various, including an AFI award plus multiple Logies for McLeod's Daughters and Hi-5

Posie Graeme-Evans (born 1952) is an Australian novelist, television and film producer, editor, screenwriter and director. She is best known as the creator and showrunner of McLeod's Daughters, the co-creator and co-producer of Hi-5, producing and creating Mirror, Mirror, and was Director of Drama for the Nine Network from 2002 to 2005. As an author she is known for six historical novels, published by NY based Simon & Schuster.

== Early life ==
Graeme-Evans is the daughter of a novelist, Eleanor, and an RAF pilot. As a very young child, she travelled with her parents to Egypt during the Suez Crisis, and she spent three years in 1960s Cyprus during Turkish-Greek Cypriot conflicts. She was educated at many schools including The Fahan School in Hobart, Tasmania, and the Wilderness School in Adelaide, South Australia. Whilst at Wilderness, she topped the State in South Australia in Ancient History. She married her first husband, Tim Jacobs, in 1971 and had her first daughter in 1972 while studying at Flinders University.

== Career ==
=== Early work ===
Her first job, at age 25, was with New Zealand TV props department and she went on to work at the Tasmanian Film Corporation as an assistant editor and then editor. Credits there include assistant editor (sound and picture) on "Manganinie" and "Fatty and George", plus editing a number of documentaries. Work at the ABC followed including directing on 1982 Commonwealth Games, directing seasons of football and basketball and, also, field and gallery director for "Nationwide", the forerunner of the 7.30 report.

Selected to be part of a course run by Alan Bateman to identify the ABC's next generation of Executive Producers – one of eight of the hundreds who applied nationally – she topped the course. Fellow attendees included Kris Noble, later Director of Drama, Nine Network and EP of Big Brother; Graham Thorburn, formerly Head of Film and Television, Australian Film, Television and Radio School; Helena Harris, who, with Graeme-Evans, later co-created Hi-5 and Ric Pellizari, long-time producer of Blue Heelers in its glory days and later, EP of Neighbours.

In 1983, Graeme-Evans moved to Sydney to direct episodes of ABC-TV music drama series Sweet and Sour (1984) produced by Jan Chapman. She later went on to produce serial drama Sons and Daughters for the Grundy Organisation, and the multi award winner, Rafferty's Rules for the Seven Network.

Graeme-Evans married her second husband Andrew Blaxland in 1990, the same year they co-founded their production company Millennium Pictures.

Her first success under the Millennium banner was as producer of the two AFI nominated children's series The Miraculous Mellops (1991–92). Then in the mid-1990s came Mirror, Mirror created by Posie and co produced by Andrew Blaxland and Dave Gibson (later head of the New Zealand Film Commission.) "Mirror Mirror" was also nominated for best children's drama in both New Zealand and Australia. In 1996 it won an AFI for best new talent with Petra Yared and was nominated for best children's drama, losing to Spellbinder. and won Best Children's Drama in the annual Listener awards in New Zealand.

Graeme-Evans then went on to co-create and co-produce the many times Logie winning and Daytime Emmy nominated Hi-5, seen now in more than 80 countries worldwide. In 1997, she produced Doom Runners. Starring Tim Curry commissioned by Nickelodeon and Showtime. This made-for-TV film about a group of children in a post-apocalyptic Earth trying to reach the last unpolluted place on Earth, New Eden, was shot with great ingenuity all around Sydney's spectacular coastline.

Posie was also creator and producer of the high-rating, much loved and many times awarded Australian drama series McLeod's Daughters (2000–08). She also produced the 1996 pilot TV movie of the same name starring Jack Thompson as Jack McLeod. Shown on mothers day 1996 the pilot became the highest rating Australian TV movie of all time. Her husband, Andrew Blaxland also worked on McLeod's Daughters as Executive in Charge of Production. During this period, Posie also co-wrote three best selling CDs of "McLeod's Daughters: Songs from the Series" with composer and long-time collaborator, multiple Aria winner, Chris Harriott.

In 2001, the Screen Producers of Australia awarded Graeme-Evans its inaugural Independent Producer of the Year award for her body of work and in late 2002, she was named alongside Meryl Streep by Variety Magazine as "one of 20 Significant woman working in film and television" in its annual worldwide survey.

=== Nine Network ===
In December 2002, Graeme-Evans became Director of Drama for the Nine Network. She is also a board member of Screen Tasmania, the Tasmanian state governments funding body for film and television.

=== Novel writing ===
In November 2005 she resigned from Nine to take up a new multi-book international deal with Simon and Schuster, and has since published six novels.

== Work ==
=== Bibliography ===
- The Innocent (ISBN 0-7318-1120-8)
- The Exiled (ISBN 0-7318-1121-6)
- The Beloved (in the US, The Uncrowned Queen) (ISBN 0-7318-1122-4)
- The Dressmaker (ISBN 978-0-7318-1472-5)
- The Island House (ISBN 978-0-7432-9443-0)
- Wild Wood (ISBN 978-1-9250-3036-5)

=== Film ===
| Title | Year | Credited as | Notes |
| Title | Year | Executive Producer | Notes |
|---|---|---|---|
| Under the Radar | 2004 | Yes | |
| The Extra | 2005 | Yes | |
| You and Your Stupid Mate | 2005 | Yes | |
| Wild Squad Adventures | 2017 | Yes | Short film |

=== Television ===
The numbers in directing and writing credits refer to the number of episodes.

| Title | Year | Credited as | | | | Network | Notes |
| Title | Year | Creator | Director | Writer | Executive Producer | Network | Notes |
|---|---|---|---|---|---|---|---|
| Sweet and Sour | 1984 | No | Yes (4) | No | No | ABC TV | |
| Sons and Daughters | 1985–87 | No | No | No | No | Seven Network | producer (367 episodes) |
| Rafferty's Rules | 1987–88 | No | No | No | No | Seven Network | producer (26 episodes) |
| Elly & Jools | 1990 | Yes | No | No | No | Nine Network | producer |
| The Miraculous Mellops | 1991–92 | No | No | Story (20) | No | Network 10 | producer |
| Mirror, Mirror | 1995–98 | Yes | No | Story | Yes | Network 10 | |
| McLeod's Daughters | 1996 | | No | Yes | No | Nine Network | Television film; producer |
| Doom Runners | 1997 | | No | No | No | Showtime | Television film; producer |
| Hi-5 | 1999–2017 | Yes | No | No | No | Nine Network | Producer (series 1–2) |
| Cushion Kids | 2001 | Yes | No | | No | Nine Network | |
| McLeod's Daughters | 2001–09 | Yes | No | No | Yes | Nine Network | Also developer, producer (2001–02), executive producer (2002–09) |
| Stingers | 2003–04 | No | No | No | Yes | Nine Network | executive producer (seasons 7–8) |
| Snobs | 2003 | No | No | No | Yes | Nine Network | |
| The Alice | 2004 | | No | No | Yes | Nine Network | Television film |
| Parallax | 2004 | No | No | No | Yes | Nine Network | |
| Big Reef | 2004 | | No | No | Yes | Nine Network | Television film |
| The Alice | 2005–06 | No | No | No | Yes | Nine Network | |
| Little Oberon | 2005 | | No | No | Yes | Nine Network | Television film |
