= Aladdin (2019 soundtrack) =

Aladdin (Original Motion Picture Soundtrack)

Soundtrack album by various artists
- Released: May 17, 2019
- Studios: AIR (London, UK); British Grove (London, UK)
- Genre: Soundtrack
- Label: Walt Disney
- Producers: Alan Menken; Matt Sullivan; Mitchell Leib

Alan Menken chronology
Beauty and the Beast (2017)	Aladdin (2019)	Disenchanted (2022)

Pasek and Paul chronology
The Greatest Showman (2017)	Aladdin (2019)	Dear Evan Hansen (Original Motion Picture Soundtrack) (2021)

Singles from Aladdin
- 1. "A Whole New World (End Title)" Released: May 9, 2019

Aladdin (Original Motion Picture Soundtrack) is a soundtrack for the film of the same name, released by Walt Disney Records on May 17, 2019. The soundtrack features a cover of "A Whole New World" by Zayn Malik and Zhavia Ward, original score and songs from the original film, a new song composed by the original film's composer, Alan Menken, and Benj Pasek and Justin Paul. The soundtrack was released on May 17, 2019.

== Background and composition ==
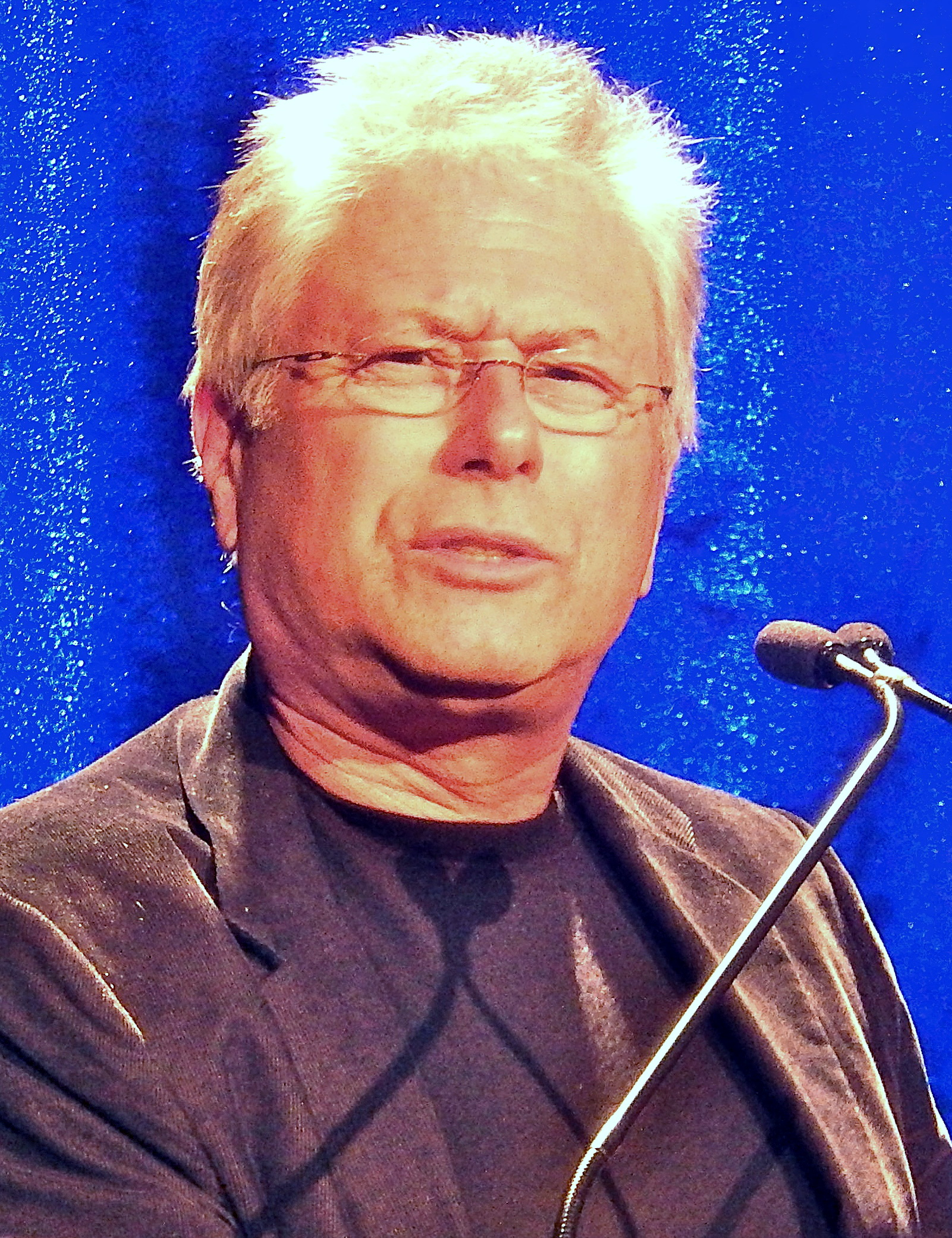
Alan Menken, who composed the score and co-wrote songs for the original film, returned to compose the remake's score and to co-write two new songs, as well as to re-write songs from the original film.

At the 2017 D23 Expo, Alan Menken, who composed the score and co-wrote songs for the animated film Aladdin, was revealed to be co-writing new songs for its 2019 live-action remake with Benj Pasek and Justin Paul, the songwriters of La La Land. Menken also composed the film's score, which included new versions of the original film's songs written by him, Howard Ashman and Tim Rice. Menken said that his score "is obviously pulled from the themes of the songs, almost exclusively, but it is much more live action in its textures and its tone" than the original film's.

Menken, Pasek and Paul also wrote new lyrics for the original film's song "Arabian Nights", which was reworked as a musical number that introduces the film's story and characters to the audience. Menken said that "[t]he job really was to be following along with the camera as it soars through Agrabah, setting up this world for the audience", to which "[he, Pasek, and Paul] rewrote some of the lyrics to go with the visuals that Guy had in mind, introducing Jafar and basically setting the stage for the rest of the film", and said that "[i]t's a much bigger, much more ambitious number than it was [in the original film]". Pasek, Paul, and Menken also rewrote the song "Prince Ali", in order to fit the Genie's actor Will Smith's personality. Smith said that "[Guy] knew how he wanted it to sound and how he wanted it to feel but gave [Smith] the freedom to use [his] hip hop background and bring a fresh vibe to [the song]".

Pasek and Paul wrote the lyrics for a solo for the character of Jasmine, titled "Speechless", which Paul called "a beautiful piece of music", praising Scott's singing as "incredible". Scott said that the song is "a punch in the face" and that "[i]t's just showcasing that [Jasmine] gets to a point where, 'It's not going to be easy and I may lose this fight, but I need to step up'", and felt that many girls will feel connected to the song's lyrics. Menken said that the song "starts with a solo piano, very intimate, and really gets into the soul of Jasmine", before becoming more instrumental, and ultimately " at the end comes back full circle to that intimate piano with her voice reaching out over it". Menken felt the song "has a beautiful arc to it", but said "the sound is orchestral and pianistic". The film's executive producer, Marc Platt, called the song "Jasmine’s big breakout song where she decides she is going to stand up for what she believes in", and felt that "[t]he song parallels her arc in the story, sung timidly by Jasmine early on and then as a big empowering moment later in the film. Jafar has seized power as her father stands by helpless, and she finally has the strength to tell him what she envisions for her future". Pasek felt that "it made a lot of sense for this really strong woman that so many girls have grown up loving to talk about reclaiming her own power". Pasek and Paul also wrote the lyrics for a new duet for Aladdin and Jasmine, which Paul referred to as "a sweet song". On May 19, 2019, Mena Massoud, who plays Aladdin, revealed that the duet was cut from the film. The duet was to have been called "Desert Moon". On August 20, 2019, Disney released the song to the public.

The film also features two re-worked versions of the song "Friend Like Me" from the original film; one performed in the film by Smith as the Genie, which was described as "a rap with melody"; and an end-credits version performed by Smith and DJ Khaled, with Khaled also producing the end-credits version. Smith and Khaled's version was released as a single. The remake also features the original film's song "A Whole New World", performed by Massoud and Scott respectively, and an end-credits version of the song performed by Zayn Malik and Zhavia Ward. Malik and Ward's version was released as a single on May 9, 2019. A bilingual English and Spanish version, "Un Mundo Ideal", performed by Malik and Becky G, was released on May 17, 2019.

Ritchie said that the new songs are "marginally shifted" to reflect the changes between the time of the original film and the remake, though he said that "essentially the soundtrack’s the same, just somewhat embellished with a couple of new tunes in it".

== Track listing ==
All music is composed by Alan Menken

No.	Title	Lyrics	Performer(s)	Length
1.	"Arabian Nights (2019)"	Howard Ashman; Benj Pasek & Justin Paul	Will Smith	3:13
2.	"One Jump Ahead"	Tim Rice	Mena Massoud	2:55
3.	"One Jump Ahead (Reprise)"	Rice	Mena Massoud	1:00
4.	"Speechless (Part 1)"	Pasek & Paul	Naomi Scott	1:17
5.	"Friend Like Me"	Ashman	Will Smith	2:35
6.	"Prince Ali"	Ashman	Will Smith	3:29
7.	"A Whole New World"	Rice	Mena Massoud and Naomi Scott	2:55
8.	"One Jump Ahead (Reprise 2)"	Rice	Mena Massoud	1:06
9.	"Speechless (Part 2)"	Pasek & Paul	Naomi Scott	2:24
10.	"A Whole New World (End Title)"	Rice	ZAYN and Zhavia Ward	4:02
11.	"Friend Like Me (End Title)"	Ashman	Will Smith featuring DJ Khaled	2:39
12.	"Speechless (Full Version)"	Pasek & Paul	Naomi Scott	3:28
13.	"The Big Ship"			1:17
14.	"Agrabah Marketplace"			1:53
15.	"Aladdin's Hideout"			1:55
16.	"Jasmine Meets Prince Anders"			0:34
17.	"Breaking In"			1:46
18.	"Returning the Bracelet"			0:58
19.	"The Dunes"			0:36
20.	"Simple Oil Lamp"			0:52
21.	"The Cave of Wonders"			2:43
22.	"The Basics"			1:38
23.	"Escape from the Cave"			1:09
24.	"Prince Ali's Outfit"			2:18
25.	"Until Tomorrow"			2:03
26.	"Aladdin's Second Wish"			2:08
27.	"Never Called a Master Friend"			2:25
28.	"Harvest Dance"			2:26
29.	"Jafar Becomes Sultan"			0:57
30.	"Hakim's Loyalty Tested"			1:14
31.	"Most Powerful Sorcerer"			1:28
32.	"Carpet Chase"			1:49
33.	"Jafar Summons the Storm"			1:20
34.	"Jafar's Final Wish"			3:37
35.	"Genie Set Free"			5:36
36.	"The Wedding"			1:11
37.	"Friend Like Me (Finale)"	Ashman	Alan Menken featuring Will Smith	1:31
Total length:				1:16:27

=== Hindi Version ===
==== Aladdin (Hindi Original Motion Picture Soundtrack) ====
No.	Title	Lyrics	Performer(s)	Length
1.	"Arabian Nights (2019)"	Howard Ashman; Benj Pasek & Justin Paul	Mantra	3:13
2.	"One Jump Ahead"	Tim Rice	Armaan Malik	2:55
3.	"One Jump Ahead (Reprise)"	Rice	Armaan Malik	1:00
4.	"Speechless (Part 1)"	Pasek & Paul	Monali Thakur	1:17
5.	"Friend Like Me"	Ashman	Mantra	2:35
6.	"Prince Ali"	Ashman	Mantra	3:29
7.	"A Whole New World"	Rice	Armaan Malik, Monali Thakur	2:55
8.	"One Jump Ahead (Reprise 2)"	Rice	Armaan Malik	1:06
9.	"Speechless (Part 2)"	Pasek & Paul	Monali Thakur	2:24
10.	"A Whole New World (End Title)"	Rice	Zayn and Zhavia Ward	4:02
11.	"Friend Like Me (End Title)"	Ashman	Mantra featuring DJ Khaled	2:39
12.	"Speechless (Full)"	Pasek & Paul	Monali Thakur	3:28
13.	"The Big Ship"			1:17
14.	"Agrabah Marketplace"			1:53
15.	"Aladdin's Hideout"			1:55
16.	"Jasmine Meets Prince Anders"			0:34
17.	"Breaking In"			1:46
18.	"Returning the Bracelet"			0:58
19.	"The Dunes"			0:36
20.	"Simple Oil Lamp"			0:52
21.	"The Cave of Wonders"			2:43
22.	"The Basics"			1:38
23.	"Escape from the Cave"			1:09
24.	"Prince Ali's Outfit"			2:18
25.	"Until Tomorrow"			2:03
26.	"Aladdin's Second Wish"			2:08
27.	"Never Called a Master Friend"			2:25
28.	"Harvest Dance"			2:26
29.	"Jafar Becomes Sultan"			0:57
30.	"Hakim's Loyalty Tested"			1:14
31.	"Most Powerful Sorcerer"			1:28
32.	"Carpet Chase"			1:49
33.	"Jafar Summons the Storm"			1:20
34.	"Jafar's Final Wish"			3:37
35.	"Genie Set Free"			5:36
36.	"The Wedding"			1:11
37.	"Friend Like Me (Finale)"	Ashman	Alan Menken featuring Will Smith	1:31
Total length:				1:16:27

== Charts ==
=== Weekly charts ===
Chart (2019–2020)	Peak position
Australian Albums (ARIA)	4
Austrian Albums (Ö3 Austria)	14
Belgian Albums (Ultratop Flanders)	17
Belgian Albums (Ultratop Wallonia)	83
Canadian Albums (Billboard)	12
Dutch Albums (Album Top 100)	17
French Albums (SNEP)	72
German Albums (Offizielle Top 100)	35
Japanese Albums (Oricon)	7
New Zealand Albums (RMNZ)	18
South Korean Albums (Gaon)	41
Spanish Albums (PROMUSICAE)	32
Swiss Albums (Schweizer Hitparade)	30
UK Compilation Chart (Official Charts Company)	3
US Billboard 200	6
US Soundtrack Albums (Billboard)	1

=== Year-end charts ===
Chart (2019)	Position
Australian Albums (ARIA)	67
Belgian Albums (Ultratop Flanders)	157
US Billboard 200	173
US Soundtrack Albums (Billboard)	9

Chart (2020)	Position
US Soundtrack Albums (Billboard)	18

== Certifications ==
Region	Certification	Certified units/sales
Italy (FIMI)	Gold	25,000^{‡}
Singapore (RIAS)	Gold	5,000^{*}
United Kingdom (BPI)	Gold	100,000^{‡}
United States (RIAA)	Gold	500,000^{‡}
^{*} Sales figures based on certification alone.^{‡} Sales+streaming figures based on certification alone.

== See also ==
- Aladdin (1992 soundtrack)
