= Aladdin (1992 soundtrack) =

1992 soundtrack album by various artists

Aladdin: Original Motion Picture Soundtrack
- Artwork for original release

Soundtrack album by Various artists
- Released: October 27, 1992
- Recorded: 1988–1992
- Studios: BMG Studios, New York Citywide; Sony Scoring Stage, Culver City; Todd-AO Studios, Los Angeles
- Genres: Film score; pop
- Length: 50:01 (1992 and 2001 releases); 56:52 (Special Edition)
- Label: Walt Disney
- Producers: Alan Menken; Tim Rice; Walter Afanasieff

Singles from Aladdin: Original Motion Picture Soundtrack
- 1. "A Whole New World (Aladdin's Theme)" Released: October 31, 1992

Professional ratings
Review scores
Source	Rating
AllMusic	5/5 stars
Filmtracks	4/5 stars

Aladdin: Original Motion Picture Soundtrack is the soundtrack for the 1992 Disney animated film Aladdin. The album was released by Walt Disney Records on CD and cassette tape on October 27, 1992. The soundtrack was intertwined with demos, work tapes, and unreleased masters, as well as original scores in 1994 in a four-disc box set entitled The Music Behind the Magic: The Musical Artistry of Alan Menken, Howard Ashman & Tim Rice. A remastered reissue with altered lyrics and new artwork was released on March 27, 2001. A special edition reissue featuring two previously released demos and new artwork was released on September 28, 2004. The Legacy Collection: Aladdin was released on September 9, 2022, to coincide with the 30th anniversary of Aladdin.

The music on the album earned composer Alan Menken the Academy Award for Best Original Score and the Golden Globe Award for Best Original Score, as well as a nomination for the BAFTA Award for Best Film Music. Menken, along with lyricist Tim Rice, also won the Academy Award for Best Original Song, the Golden Globe Award for Best Original Song and a Grammy Award for Song of the Year for the song "A Whole New World". It is currently the first and only Disney song to win Song of the Year at the Grammy Awards. The album is one of the best-selling soundtrack albums to an animated film, with 3 million copies sold in the United States and 300,000 copies sold in Canada.

== Track listing ==
All music is composed by Alan Menken.

Aladdin: Original Motion Picture Soundtrack
No.	Title	Lyrics	Performer(s)	Length
1.	"Arabian Nights" (^{[A]})	Howard Ashman	Bruce Adler	1:19
2.	"Legend of the Lamp" (includes a monologue by Robin Williams)		(score)	1:25
3.	"One Jump Ahead"	Tim Rice	Brad Kane	2:22
4.	"Street Urchins"		(score)	1:52
5.	"One Jump Ahead (Reprise)"	Rice	Brad Kane	1:01
6.	"Friend Like Me"	Ashman	Robin Williams	2:26
7.	"To Be Free"		(score)	1:39
8.	"Prince Ali"	Ashman	Robin Williams	2:51
9.	"A Whole New World"	Rice	Brad Kane, Lea Salonga	2:40
10.	"Jafar's Hour"		(score)	2:43
11.	"Prince Ali (Reprise)"	Rice	Jonathan Freeman	1:07
12.	"The Ends of the Earth"		(score)	1:35
13.	"The Kiss"		(score)	1:51
14.	"On a Dark Night"		(score)	2:55
15.	"Jasmine Runs Away"		(score)	0:46
16.	"Marketplace"		(score)	2:37
17.	"The Cave of Wonders"		(score)	4:57
18.	"Aladdin's Word" (includes cue from When You Wish Upon a Star)		(score)	1:51
19.	"The Battle"		(score)	3:39
20.	"Happy End in Agrabah" (^{[B]})		(score)	4:15
21.	"A Whole New World (Aladdin's Theme)"	Rice	Peabo Bryson, Regina Belle	4:05
Total length:				50:01

Notes

- A "Where they cut off your ear/If they don't like your face" were revised to "Where it's flat and immense/And the heat is intense" for remastered reissues.
- B Version included on the original CD and cassette releases (1992) contains several alternate cues.

All lyrics are written by Howard Ashman; all music is composed by Alan Menken.

Aladdin (Special Edition Soundtrack)
No.	Title	Performer(s)	Length
22.	"Proud of Your Boy (Demo)"	Alan Menken	2:29
23.	"High Adventure (Demo)"	Alan Menken, Howard Ashman	4:21
Total length:			6:50

All music is composed by Alan Menken.

The Music Behind the Magic: Aladdin
No.	Title	Lyrics	Performed by:	Length
1.	"Arabian Nights" (demo/final)	Howard Ashman	Alan Menken, Bruce Adler	1:48
2.	"Legend of the Lamp" (final/dialogue by Robin Williams)		(score)	1:24
3.	"On a Dark Night" (final)		(score)	2:54
4.	"One Jump Ahead" (final)	Tim Rice	Brad Kane	2:22
5.	"Street Urchins" (final)		(score)	1:56
6.	"One Jump Ahead, Reprise" (final)	Rice	Kane	1:00
7.	"Count on Me" (demo)	Alan Menken	Menken	2:38
8.	"Call Me a Princess" (demo)	Ashman	Howard Ashman, Menken	2:40
9.	"Jasmine Runs Away" (final)		(score)	0:44
10.	"Marketplace" (final)		(score)	2:36
11.	"Why Me" (unreleased master)	Rice	Jonathan Freeman	3:21
12.	"Friend Like Me" (work tape)	Ashman	Ashman, Menken	1:07
13.	"Friend Like Me" (final)	Ashman	Robin Williams	2:27
14.	"To Be Free" (final)		(score)	1:37
15.	"The Cave of Wonders" (final)		(score)	4:56
16.	"Prince Ali" (demo)	Ashman	Ashman, Menken	4:13
17.	"Prince Ali" (final)	Ashman	Williams	2:51
18.	"A Whole New World" (work tape)	Rice	Menken, Tim Rice	0:50
19.	"A Whole New World" (final)	Rice	Kane, Lea Salonga	2:39
20.	"The Kiss" (final)		(score)	1:50
21.	"Aladdin's World" (final)		(score)	1:51
22.	"Humiliate the Boy" (demo)	Ashman	Freeman, Menken	3:42
23.	"Jafar's Hour" (final)		(score)	2:39
24.	"Prince Ali, Reprise" (final)	Rice	Freeman	1:12
25.	"The Ends of the Earth" (final)		(score)	1:35
26.	"The Battle" (final)		(score)	3:38
27.	"Happy End in Agrabah" (final)		(score)	4:14
28.	"Arabian Nights, Reprise" (unreleased master)	Ashman	Adler	0:44
29.	"A Whole New World (Aladdin's Theme)" (single)	Rice	Peabo Bryson, Regina Belle	4:05
Total length:				70:44

All lyrics are written by Howard Ashman; all music is composed by Alan Menken.

The Music Behind the Magic: Aladdin (The Original Score)
No.	Title	Performed by:	Length
1.	"Arabian Nights, Reprise #1" (demo)	Ashman, Menken	0:31
2.	"Babkak, Omar, Aladdin, Kassim" (demo)	Ashman, Menken	2:45
3.	"Arabian Nights, Reprise #2" (demo)	Ashman, Menken	0:32
4.	"Friend Like Me" (demo)	Ashman, Menken	2:35
5.	"Proud of Your Boy" (demo)	Ashman, Menken	2:27
6.	"How Quick They Forget" (demo)	Ashman, Menken	3:57
7.	"Arabian Nights, Reprise #3" (demo)	Ashman, Menken	0:34
8.	"High Adventure" (demo)	Ashman, Menken	4:19
9.	"Arabian Nights, Reprise #4" (demo)	Ashman, Menken	0:43
Total length:			18:47

== Unreleased score and songs ==
=== Cut songs ===
Howard Ashman and Alan Menken composed several songs for an initial story treatment of Aladdin prior to beginning work on Beauty and the Beast. This story treatment incorporated several plot elements from the original folk tale and additional characters that were eliminated during later story development. Three songs from this score - "Arabian Nights", "Friend Like Me" and "Prince Ali" - survive in the final film.

Menken composed several additional songs for the subsequent story revisions following Ashman's 1991 death, prior to Tim Rice's involvement with the project.

Work tape, demo and master recordings of cut songs have been released in several formats, notably on the 1994 The Music Behind the Magic box set, the 2004 special edition soundtrack and the 2004 DVD release of the film.

1990 Original Score - music by Alan Menken, lyrics by Howard Ashman.

- Arabian Nights
- Arabian Nights (Reprise #1)
- Babkak, Omar, Aladdin, Kassim
- Arabian Nights (Reprise #2)
- Friend Like Me
- To Be Free
- Proud of Your Boy – A demo version performed by Menken was featured on the 2004 special edition soundtrack. A pop version recorded by Clay Aiken was included on the 2004 DVD release of the film. In 2011, it was restored in the film's stage musical adaptation.
- How Quick They Forget
- Arabian Nights (Reprise #3)
- High Adventure – A demo version performed by Menken and Ashman was featured on the 2004 special edition soundtrack.
- Arabian Nights (Reprise #4) — This was later used as the ending for Aladdin and the King of Thieves.

Additional Menken/Ashman demos

- Call Me a Princess – A cover version was recorded by actress/singer Kerry Butler and released on her first solo album, Faith, Trust & Pixie Dust in May 2008.
- Humiliate the Boy

Menken solo demos

- Count on Me

Menken/Tim Rice demos

- Why Me
- My Time Has Come
- My Finest Hour

== Accolades ==
Awards
Award	Category	Recipient(s) and nominee(s)	Result
Academy Awards	Best Original Song	"A Whole New World" – Alan Menken and Tim Rice	Won
Academy Awards	Best Original Song	"Friend Like Me" – Alan Menken and Howard Ashman	Nominated
Academy Awards	Best Original Score	Alan Menken	Won
Academy Awards	Best Sound Effects Editing	Mark Mangini	Nominated
Academy Awards	Best Sound	Terry Porter, Mel Metcalfe, David J. Hudson, Doc Kane	Nominated
British Academy Film Awards	Best Original Film Score	Alan Menken	Nominated
Golden Globe Awards	Best Original Song	"A Whole New World" – Alan Menken and Tim Rice	Won
Golden Globe Awards	Best Original Song	"Friend Like Me" – Alan Menken and Howard Ashman	Nominated
Golden Globe Awards	Best Original Song	"Prince Ali" – Alan Menken and Howard Ashman	Nominated
Golden Globe Awards	Best Original Score	Alan Menken	Won
Grammy Awards	Best Score Soundtrack for Visual Media	Alan Menken, Tim Rice, Walter Afanasieff	Won
Grammy Awards	Record of the Year	"A Whole New World" – Walter Afanasieff	Nominated
Grammy Awards	Song of the Year	"A Whole New World" – Alan Menken and Tim Rice	Won
Grammy Awards	Best Pop Performance by a Duo or Group With Vocals	"A Whole New World" – Peabo Bryson and Regina Belle	Won
Grammy Awards	Best Song Written Specifically for a Motion Picture or for Television	"A Whole New World" – Alan Menken and Tim Rice	Won
Grammy Awards	Best Song Written Specifically for a Motion Picture or for Television	"Friend Like Me" – Alan Menken and Howard Ashman	Nominated
Grammy Awards	Best Musical Album for Children	Alan Menken and Tim Rice	Won
MTV Movie Awards	Best Song from a Movie	"A Whole New World" – Peabo Bryson and Regina Belle	Nominated
Saturn Awards	Best Music	Alan Menken	Nominated

== Charts ==
=== Weekly charts ===
Chart (1992–1994)	Peak position
Australian Albums (ARIA)	15
Canada Top Albums/CDs (RPM)	17
New Zealand Albums (RMNZ)	29
US Billboard 200	6

Chart (2019)	Peak position
UK Soundtrack Albums (Official Charts) Special edition soundtrack	21

Chart (2026)	Peak position
Belgian Compilation Albums (Ultratop 50 Flanders)	10

=== Year-end charts ===
Chart (1993)	Position
Australian Albums (ARIA)	66
Canada Top Albums/CDs (RPM)	95
US Billboard 200	20

== Certifications and sales ==
Region	Certification	Certified units/sales
Australia (ARIA)	Platinum	70,000^{^}
Canada (Music Canada)	3× Platinum	300,000^{^}
Germany (BVMI)	Gold	250,000^{^}
Japan (RIAJ)	Platinum	350,000
Spain (Promusicae)	Gold	50,000^{^}
Sweden (GLF)	Gold	50,000^{^}
Taiwan	—	150,000
United Kingdom (BPI)	Silver	60,000^{‡}
United States (RIAA)	3× Platinum	3,000,000^{^}
^{^} Shipments figures based on certification alone.^{‡} Sales+streaming figures based on certification alone.

== See also ==
- The Music Behind the Magic
- Aladdin (2019 soundtrack)
