= Proud of Your Boy =

Song written for Disney's Aladdin

Song by Adam Jacobs

from the album Aladdin: Original Broadway Cast Recording
- Released: May 27, 2014
- Recorded: March 30, 2014
- Length: 2:20
- Label: Walt Disney
- Composer: Alan Menken
- Lyricist: Howard Ashman

"Proud of Your Boy" is a song written by lyricist Howard Ashman and composer Alan Menken. Originally intended for Disney's animated film Aladdin (1992), the song was omitted when Aladdin's mother was written out of the story. After being discarded, "Proud of Your Boy" remained largely undiscovered by audiences until Walt Disney Records released Ashman and Menken's demo on a compilation album in 1994, after which it gradually gained popularity. The song was eventually restored for the film's stage musical adaptation in 2011, originally performed and recorded by American actor Adam Jacobs. Lyrically, "Proud of Your Boy" is about a young man promising his mother that he will change his mischievous ways and ultimately make her proud.

"Proud of Your Boy" was one of the first songs Ashman and Menken wrote for Aladdin, of which Ashman was particularly fond. Some of Ashman's collaborators theorize that the lyricist based the song on his relationship with his own mother. Following Ashman's death during the film's production, the role of Aladdin's mother grew increasingly inconsequential as the story was revised. Disney executive Jeffrey Katzenberg eventually insisted that both the mother and song be eliminated altogether, much to the disappointment of several crew members. Actors Scott Weinger and Brad Kane auditioned for the film using the song; both were ultimately cast as Aladdin's speaking and singing voice, respectively.

When Aladdin's stage adaptation was green-lit, "Proud of Your Boy" was one of the first songs Menken and playwright Chad Beguelin prioritized including in the musical, which Aladdin sings in memory of his late mother. "Proud of Your Boy" premiered on stage to mostly positive reviews from critics, some of whom named it the show's best new addition; it has since become the musical's signature song. Although most fans discovered the song via the musical, it had already become a cult favorite upon release of its demo, being considered a popular audition song among the musical theatre community.

== Background and writing ==
"Proud of Your Boy" was written by lyricist Howard Ashman and composer Alan Menken. "Proud of Your Boy" was one of the first few songs written for Aladdin (1992), after "Arabian Nights" and "Friend Like Me". In early drafts of Aladdin's screenplay, the character of the same name's mother is alive and central to the film's plot, expressing disappointment in her son's behavior. The nature of their relationship is explored in "Proud of Your Boy", during which Aladdin promises to change for the better. Particularly fond of Aladdin's mother, Ashman had strong feelings towards the song. Ashman is believed to have written "Proud of Your Boy" about his own parents. Actress and singer Jodi Benson, with whom he had worked on Disney's The Little Mermaid (1989), described the lyricist as an underdog struggling to believe in himself and believes Ashman wrote "Proud of Your Boy" out of a constant desire to please his parents. Director Ron Clements agreed that the ballad "meant a lot to Ashman because of his own relationship with his mother". However, producer Don Hahn refuted popular claims that Ashman had intentionally written "Proud of Your Boy" about their relationship, explaining, "Was it underneath the topic? Yeah, probably. But it was never overt. But we are artists, and artists do works that reflect their times."

Originally written for Aladdin to sing to his mother, "Proud of Your Boy" was discarded once the mother character was written out of the film.

Originally intended to appear in the film after "One Jump Ahead", "Proud of Your Boy" was one of several solos written for the character of Aladdin that were ultimately omitted. Early storyboards of the sequence depict Aladdin with a disguised Jafar, suggesting that Aladdin's first meeting with the vizier had originally been envisioned differently. Following Ashman's death in 1991, the song was discarded while the story was revised, with both the mother and song ultimately being written out of the film. The role of Aladdin's mother had become increasingly inconsequential, to the point where Disney executive Jeffrey Katzenberg ordered that she be removed entirely following a test screening. With the mother deceased and Aladdin orphaned, "Proud of Your Boy" was deemed unsalvageable and irrelevant to the film's narrative. Since Ashman had died prior to the screening, he was not available to convince Katzenberg to spare "Proud of Your Boy" or write a replacement.

"Proud of Your Boy" was highly regarded among the film's staff, and they continued to cherish the song despite its elimination. Story artist Ed Gombert maintains that very few of Aladdin's filmmakers agreed with Katzenberg's decision, many of whom were saddened by the song's removal. Director John Musker believes the omission cost the film one of Ashman and Menken's "finest songs"; Clements described the song's elimination as "more painful" than those of other deleted songs. Menken found it particularly taxing to cope with the song's omission, identifying "Proud of Your Boy" as the most difficult component of Aladdin to lose due to Ashman's demise. Menken attempted to replace "Proud of Your Boy" himself by writing a song for Aladdin to sing to Abu entitled "You Can Count On Me", which was also rejected.

The omission of "Proud of Your Boy" eventually led to the completion of the film's romantic theme song, "A Whole New World", since Aladdin required a new ballad to replace it. "Proud of Your Boy" was initially envisioned as the film's show-stopping ballad, prior to the replacement. After the song's omission, Aladdin's mother is never mentioned or alluded to. Jerry Beck, author of The Animated Movie Guide, wrote that the elimination of "Proud of Your Boy" and the mother resulted in Aladdin becoming "another Disney hero in a long line of motherless waifs".

== Recording and release ==
After being cast as Aladdin's speaking voice, actor Scott Weinger lied to the filmmakers about his musical experience and auditioned to sing in Aladdin by performing "Proud of Your Boy". Disney provided Weinger with sheet music and a demo recording of the song on audio cassette, which he rehearsed with a vocal coach. Ultimately unimpressed with his efforts, Menken warned Weinger that he would never sing in the film, but the filmmakers assured him they would instead hire a professional singer to match with his speaking voice. Weinger joked that he still carries "a chip on my shoulder" over being denied a singing role in the film and, as of 2019, he occasionally rehearses "Proud of Your Boy" with Menken. Singer Brad Kane was eventually cast as Aladdin's singing voice. He had also auditioned using "Proud of Your Boy", singing for both Ashman and Menken, but did not hear back from Disney until a year after his audition. "Proud of Your Boy" was the first song Kane sang for Aladdin, of which he also recorded a version before it was discarded. In addition to being Menken's final collaboration with Ashman, "Proud of Your Boy" was one of the last songs Ashman wrote before his death; he spent his final days listening to audition recordings of the song from his deathbed.

Ashman and Menken's original demo recording was first released on the album The Music Behind the Magic (1994), a compilation box set consisting of unreleased material and demos from The Little Mermaid, Beauty and the Beast (1991) and Aladdin. Andrea Baillie of News 95.7 wrote that the song's appearance on the album truly offered "Proud of Your Boy" "a second chance". Menken recalled that the song first experienced a resurgence in popularity following its appearance on the compilation, after which the song was initially circulated among auditions, describing it as "this secret thing ... people would perform". The song was used by Menken as one of the original audition songs for the titular character in Hercules (1997), which ultimately secured Roger Bart the role. This was the only medium on which the demo was available for quite a long time, until it was re-discovered in the Disney Vault around the time of an upcoming special edition DVD's release.

The demo was then included as a bonus track on the special edition soundtrack release of Aladdin, with Menken performing lead vocals. The version was made available to the public on October 11, 2004. The song's history and development are explored in an Aladdin behind-the-scenes featurette that is hosted by Musker and Clements, dedicated to "Proud of Your Boy". Oh My Disney contributor Emily Brandon believes that, prior to the stage adaptation, awareness of the song's existence had been limited to "[h]ardcore Aladdin fans". Having originated the role on stage, actor Adam Jacobs recorded the song for Aladdin: Original Broadway Cast Recording, which was released on March 27, 2014. Jacobs also recorded a version of the song for his debut studio album Right Where I Belong (2015), a compilation album of Jacobs performing some of Menken's compositions.

== Context ==
=== Background ===
Disney and Ashman's collaborators had long held "Proud of Your Boy" in high regard, several years prior to the stage musical's inception. Considering "Proud of Your Boy" a "lost gem", Menken prioritized including it in the stage adaptation once the show had been green-lit, recognizing the song among several of his Disney compositions that eventually rediscover the "spotlight" after being omitted from their original projects. Disney Theatrical Productions (DTP) associate producer Paula McKinnon reported that "Proud of Your Boy" was one of the first songs the show's creative team agreed to reintroduce via the musical. When playwright and lyricist Chad Beguelin first pitched his Aladdin script to Menken, Beguelin had not initially written it as a Broadway musical; Menken requested that Beguelin revise his script to include as many of Ashman's discarded Aladdin songs as possible, the first of which was "Proud of Your Boy".

Deciding the musical would benefit from immediately establishing its "I Want" song, Beguelin envisioned using "Proud of Your Boy" to "dr[ive Aladdin] through the rest of the show'". Expanding upon the original idea of Aladdin's mother, Beguelin opted to incorporate the song in the musical by having Aladdin sing it "to the heavens" for his late mother. He said the ballad evolved into the musical's "through line" and "spine", believing the main character "wants to make good" but continues on "making these bad decisions and finally when he drops the line, drops the act and becomes his true self, all of his dreams come true". Additionally Beguelin contributed new, original lyrics to the song's two reprises.

Menken and Thomas Schumacher, president of the Disney Theatrical Group, considered the song's resurrection a "personal victory". Identifying the song as one of his favorite restorations due to its pivotal message, Menken said he is especially thrilled Ashman's "Proud of Your Boy" "once again has pride of place in the story of a boy who finally became all that a mother could wish for in a son". Highlighting "Proud of Your Boy" as his favorite song to perform in musical, Jacobs explained that Aladdin uses the song to assure his mother, "I'm going to be the person you want me to be, and make you proud"; Jacobs credits the ballad with "ground[ing] my character and (it) carries me through the whole show". Actor Telly Leung shared Jacob's sentiment, writing the song offers "a great exploration of Aladdin's character". To prepare for performances of the ballad, Jacobs would draw inspiration from major events that had occurred throughout his life. At times he found it a challenge to transition from having his character evade capture by running and jumping in the previous number directly into "Proud of Your Boy" "half-a-minute later". He suggested for performers of the song to build cardio and perform jumping jacks prior to singing it.

=== Use in Aladdin ===
Highlighting "Aladdin's low opinion of himself", Nerdist's Amy Ratcliffe summarized "Proud of Your Boy" saying that "Aladdin thinks he's a screw-up but also believes he’ll turn things around and make his mom proud". The song offers undiscovered insight into the character's background and family. "Proud of Your Boy" is one of four Ashman-Menken songs not included in the original film that were resurrected for the musical, alongside "Babkak, Omar, Aladdin, Kassim", "Call Me a Princess" and "High Adventure". "Proud of Your Boy" is one of seven songs overall–consisting of ones restored from Menken's previous work and original numbers written specifically for the show–heard in the musical. Aladdin now sings "Proud of Your Boy" in memory of his late mother, revealing his true intentions to make her proud.

Further delving into the character's "aspirations and insecurities", Aladdin is introduced in the musical as homeless and having to resort to stealing food to survive. Remembering a vow he made to himself following her death, Aladdin seeks forgiveness from his mother, promising to "go straight as a street entertainer" and ultimately make her proud, as opposed to being a "worthless street rat". Having voiced no such motivation in the film, "Proud of Your Boy" serves as Aladdin's "I want" song in the show and offers dimension to the character "that we don't get to see in the cartoon", according to London Theatre Direct contributor Nicholas Ephram. The song also establishes that Aladdin wishes to be a prince not only to impress Jasmine, but also please his mother, further clarifying his inherent "goodness". Director and choreographer Casey Nicholaw explained that, "When Aladdin sings 'Proud of Your Boy,' ... you learn more about him, how he feels like an underdog, how he's trying to win the approval of his mother, than you could from just the dialogue." The song is adapted into Aladdin's recurring theme throughout the rest of the musical. The film's first act concludes with Aladdin wishing to be a prince and reprising "Proud of Your Boy". Despite a reprise in the second act, Aladdin's mother is not mentioned again. Jasmine's solo "These Palace Walls" corresponds to "Proud of Your Boy".

Beth Deitchman of D23 believes the song "has become a powerful part of" the musical. Beguelin described "Proud of Your Boy" as "one of those songs that I think everyone can relate to because at some point, no matter how horrible your relationship with your family is, you do want to make your parents proud". Both Beguelin and Ashman identify as gay; although Beguelin preferred not to speak on behalf of the latter, he admitted "for me, there is another level to it being gay, that moment when you realize and you wonder what your parents are going to think."

== Music and lyrics ==
According to the song's official sheet music by Walt Disney Music Publishing, "Proud of Your Boy" is a solemn power ballad performed "[w]ith determination" in the key of D major. Jacobs' vocal range on the song spans one octave, from E_{3} to F♯_{4}. The track has a duration of 2:20. Sara Franks-Allen of ScreenCrush described the ballad as bittersweet, while Soundtrack.Net's Dan Goldwasser deemed it "tender". The song is performed in the range of a tenor, the vocals for which Elizabeth Marie Himchak of The San Diego Union-Tribune called "soulful". A "traditional stripped-down solo", the track features orchestral instruments. Menken's demo on Aladdin's special edition soundtrack, which Heather Phares of AllMusic described as "an earnest ballad in the style of 'A Whole New World'", spans 2:29.

"Proud of Your Boy" is about the relationship between a son and his mother. Christian Ziebarth of Animated Views wrote that the song's poignancy "personifies every child's desire to make their mother proud". Its lyrics begin "Proud of your boy, I'll make you proud of your boy", with Aladdin apologizing to his mother for being "one rotten kid" and "a louse and a loafer". Identifying "Proud of Your Boy" as Aladdin's most emotional song, Ratcliffe believes its lyrics are relatable to "anyone who's ever suffered from imposter syndrome or experienced general feelings of inadequacy". The song's lyrics include, "I'll do my best, what else can I do? / Since I wasn't born perfect like Dad or you / Mom, I will try to Try hard to make you / Proud of your boy." The lyrics promise to "turn over a new leaf and end his 'screwin’-up times'".

Muthi Achadiat Kautsar of The Jakarta Post said the track depicts "a young man's reassurance to his mother that he will be a good man, despite how bad he'd been and how he’d wasted time". Jacobs said the song adopts an entirely "new meaning" following the births of his own children and death of his grandmother, expounding that he now "see[s] how she would've felt about her son". Believing "Proud of Your Boy" "packs an enormous emotional punch", Menken observed that men particularly appear to relate "deeply" because "many of us go through a phase when we are disappointing our parents, or we think we are". Actor Graeme Isaako, who played Aladdin in international and touring productions, agreed that "Proud of Your Boy" is particularly relatable, observing that it can pertain to various situations such as losing one's parents, changing careers or simply "going on a different journey". The lyrics are considered to be among the most personal of Ashman's career. As a gay man himself, Beguelin believes the song's lyrics have "another level to it [related to] being gay...and wondering what your parents are going to think of you".

== Reception ==
Reviewing Ashman and Menken's demo, Phares described the song as "intriguing" and Menken's vocals as "effective". The staff of Filmtracks.com offered a mixed opinion; while saying the addition is "interesting to a degree", they found its appearance insignificant due to the availability on previous releases. However, the staff described "Proud of Your Boy" as "a strong enough ballad that it should have made the final picture, reflecting Menken at his best". Comingsoon.net's Scott Chitwood found the demo inferior to the film's surviving songs, but appreciated learning about the creators' "emotional attachment" and described it as a "good song" nonetheless. Ratcliffe wrote that the song's lyrics and music "deliver an emotional jab". Reviewing the film's 2004 DVD, Susan King of the Los Angeles Times hailed "Proud of Your Boy" as a "high point" among the DVD's bonus content, describing it as "a beautiful, haunting tune". Nathan Cone of Texas Public Radio deemed the track "wonderful", while MovieWeb's Brian B. called it a "lost gem".

Kathi Scrizzi Driscoll of the Cape Cod Times hailed the ballad as the musical's most successful new addition for "add[ing] a depth of feeling". Sharon Eberson of the Pittsburgh Post-Gazette agreed that the "touching" ballad is the musical's best song, while Garrett Southerland of Talkin' Broadway named it a "standout among these [new] additions". The staff of New York Theatre Guide described it as a "beautifully poignant ballad". Newsday writer Linda Winer called the song "endearing", naming it the musical's central new addition. Business Insider's Claire Tan reviewed Isaako's "beautiful" rendition as "a poignant insight into Aladdin's backstory". The Signal Tribune's Anita W. Harris agreed that the ballad "add[s] more poignancy to his character than in the film". Alexandra Heilbron of Tribute called the song show-stopping, while Chad Jones of TheaterMania called it "effective". Michelle F. Solomon of MiamiArtZine identified "Proud of Your Boy" as "Aladdin's vocal moment to wow the audience", while San Diego Magazine's Dan Letchworth called it the best of the musical's restored songs. Praising Jacob's performance, David Rooney of The Hollywood Reporter wrote that the actor imbues his rendition with tenderness and warmth. Identifying the song as a musical highlight, Misha Davenport of BroadwayWorld said Jacobs "does some emotional-charged vocal work in the song and its inclusion adds another layer to the character beyond just getting rich and falling in love". Davenport also said the song features some of Ashman's best lyrics. The News & Review's Tessa Marguerite Outland found actor Clinton Greenspan's rendition particularly "flawless". Cristy Meiners of the Deseret News also commended Greenspan's performance for "conveying a young man struggling to discover himself".

The Times of San Diego's Pat Launer was grateful to the ballad for "offset[ting]" the show's "busy, frenzied scenes". Writing for LEO Weekly, Annie Bush reported that several audience members "not-so-subtly wiped the corners of their eyes" during "Proud of Your Boy". However, Emma Presnell, for the same publication, found herself missing the musical's larger ensemble musical numbers during the ballad. In a mixed review, Dino-Ray Ramos of Deadline Hollywood said that audiences are unlikely to leave the show singing "Proud of Your Boy", despite it being a "great addition to an already strong soundtrack". The staff of Variety said "Proud of Your Boy" "is undeniably pretty, but emblematic of one of the problems the show's creators need to address", explaining that the show "has few truly earnest moments – so few that they feel out of place; they deflate next to the buoyant hijinks bracketing them. Either the transitions between the two need to be massaged or the show needs to go all-in with broad comedy and leave the tearjerking for another day." Vulture.com's Jesse Green was bored by the song, finding its reprise particularly inconsequential. Margaret Gray of the Los Angeles Times found the ballad unneeded. While C. Edwards of Cartoon Brew wrote that, "It's nice to see Aladdin ... finally get to sing the song to his mother", Edwards found it unfortunate that "he sings it to her in absentia, because she is dead", joking, "poor lady just can't seem to catch a break". Salt Lake Magazine's Jen Hill found the song's message "odd" within the context of the musical, feeling Aladdin should have been focused on proving things to himself.

== Live performances and covers ==
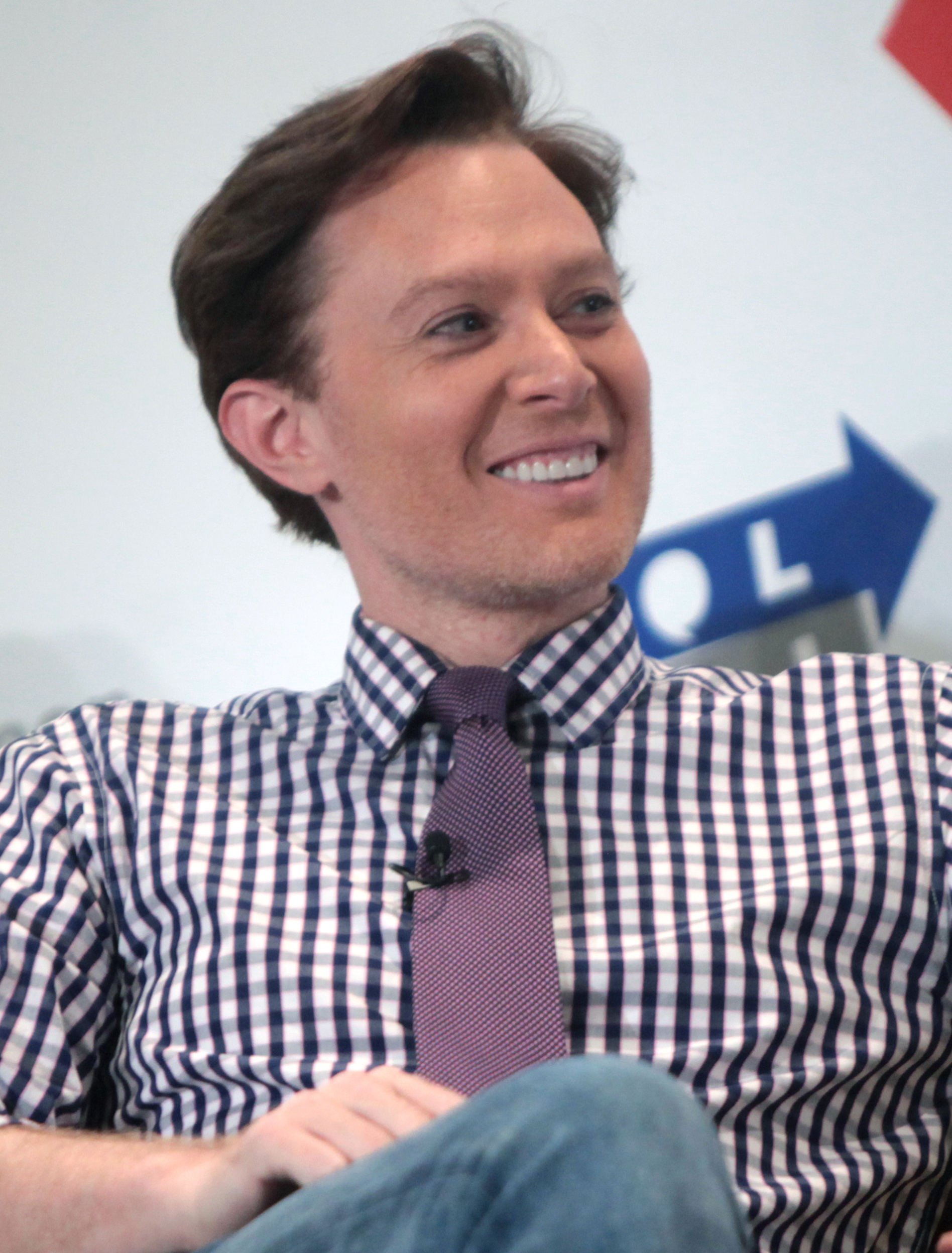
Singer Clay Aiken covered "Proud of Your Boy" for the film's 2004 special edition DVD release, which he also used to promote his debut headlining tour the same year.

In 2016, Kane sang "Proud of Your Boy" prior to the main performance of "The Little Mermaid in Concert" at the Hollywood Bowl. Jacobs sang "Proud of Your Boy" at a gala hosted by Theatre Development Fund in honor of Disney Theatrical Productions that same year. Menken has performed the song live on several occasions. "Proud of Your Boy" was the first song Menken performed during his set for Billboard's "Billboard on Broadway" series in 2017. From 2017 to 2019, Menken regularly performed "Proud of Your Boy" throughout his A Whole New World of Alan Menken concerts, typically as an encore. Menken dedicated the song to Ashman in his 2017 performance at the D23 Expo, about which D23 contributor Courtney Potter wrote now "holds a special place in our hearts". Menken's 2019 performance at the Auditorium Theatre coincided with the recent deaths of his own parents, with him using "Proud of Your Boy" to pay tribute to both them and Ashman. In 2019, actor Greenspan sang "Proud of Your Boy" during A Musical Celebration of Aladdin at the D23 Expo, prior to taking over the title role on Broadway himself.

Singer Clay Aiken recorded an orchestral cover of "Proud of Your Boy" for Aladdin's 2004 platinum edition DVD release, the music video for which interpolates storyboard drawings and sketches. The video stars Aiken singing in a recording studio accompanied by a live orchestra, while excerpts from the film play in the background. Chitwood described Aiken's voice as "perfect for the tune" and observed that Menken appears content with his performance throughout. Animation World Network's Bill Desowitz wrote that Aiken's rendition offers "a glimpse at a more intimate vision of" Aladdin's character. Michael Sheridan of Tail Slate cited "Proud of Your Boy" as "the only time I will give Clay Aiken any good notices", explaining that the cover exhibits the singer's strengths: "He has a powerful voice, one ideally suited for Broadway, and he delivers this tune with softness and strength that is honestly outstanding." Similarly, DVD Talk's Geoffrey Kleinman was "extremely impressed" by the cover despite not being a fan of Aiken, writing, "It's a fantastic song" with which Aiken "does an impressive job".

In addition to a "making-of" featurette starring Aiken and Menken, the DVD also includes rough storyboard animation accompanied by Ashman and Menken's "Proud of Your Boy" demo, as well as an option to watch the original story reel with Aiken's vocals. The cover was also included on the compilation album Disneymania 3 (2005), which Phares described as "sweetly traditional". Disney-owned distributor Buena Vista Pictures had agreed to sponsor Aiken's first headlining tour, during which all 50 concerts opened with a video montage of Aiken's "Proud of Your Boy" cover. Buena Vista also used "Proud of Your Boy" to promote both the DVD and their arrangement with Aiken, the latter of which is considered the first sponsorship deal of its kind. Although Disney discussed including Aiken's cover on future soundtrack re-releases, they did not confirm a single release.

In 2014, actor and singer Darren Criss performed the song during ABC's television special Backstage with Disney on Broadway: Celebrating 20 Years. Accompanying himself on guitar, the singer's rendition has been described as "par[ed] down from its more orchestral Broadway version" while remaining "beautifully plaintive". Entertainment Weekly's Esther Zuckerman predicted that Criss' rendition will offer "even more exposure".

== Impact ==
"Proud of Your Boy" has established itself as one of the musical's signature songs. Although the song's popularity was revived upon its inclusion on The Music Behind the Magic, most contemporary audiences and listeners were first introduced to the song via the musical, with it becoming "a staple" several years after being written. However, prior to the song's stage debut, "Proud of Your Boy" had already become a popular selection among theater fans and auditionees, which Menken described as "this secret thing ... people would perform" at auditions, prompting 680 News to deem it an "underground sensation". The song is considered a cult favorite. The staff of The Mississauga News reported that "Proud of Your Boy" became a cult favorite when it was included on The Music Behind the Magic, writing that the stage production additionally restored it "to wonderful effect".

ShowTickets.com ranked the ballad among "The 10 Best Musical Numbers from Disney's Stage Musicals", commending it for allowing audiences an opportunity to empathize with the titular character. BroadwayWorld's Aaron Kaburick described "Proud of Your Boy" as "perfect for any Disney audition", ranking it among the 20 best baritone audition songs. Actor Leung said the song "found new life in the stage production". There was speculation about whether the song would be included in the then-upcoming 2019 live-action adaption of the film. Jackson McHenry of Vulture joked that fans of the song will riot if it is not included, which he wrote "empirically bangs" in the musical. Although the song itself was ultimately not included in the film, excerpts were interpolated into its score.

The Proud Boys, an American far-right neo-fascist group, derived their name from the song. It is recommended that members sing the song at meetings.
