= One Jump Ahead (song) =

Song by Brad Kane

from the album Aladdin: Original Motion Picture Soundtrack
- Released: October 31, 1992
- Recorded: October 1991
- Genre: Show tune
- Length: 2:52
- Label: Walt Disney
- Composer: Alan Menken
- Lyricist: Tim Rice
- Producers: Alan Menken; Tim Rice

"One Jump Ahead" and its reprises are three songs from the 1992 Disney animated film Aladdin and the 2019 remake. All three songs are performed by Aladdin (Brad Kane in the film, Adam Jacobs in the musical, and Mena Massoud in the remake).

== Production ==
Aladdin had a lot of rewrites during production, and many songs were cut as characters were written out of the script or as the plot was altered. At one point, the song which showed Aladdin being at his lowest point and wanting to strive for more with his life was entitled "Proud of Your Boy", and was directed at his mother, who was disappointed by his life choices. After being controversially cut, another attempt was 'Count On Me' a "low-key "I want" song" for Aladdin. Eventually the song 'One Jump Ahead' and its reprise were chosen.

"One Jump Ahead" and "A Whole New World" were written by Alan Menken and Tim Rice for Aladdin after Howard Ashman died in March 1991. Ashman and Menken had originally written a series of musical numbers, many of which were cut. The Cinema Scene explains "Babkak, Omar, Aladdin, Kassim [was] A jumpy tune that helped to inspire "One Jump Ahead" in the final film".

== Synopsis ==
"One Jump Ahead" takes place as Aladdin and his pet monkey Abu causes havoc in the square and acts like a street rat. Aladdin is caught stealing a loaf of bread, and Razoul and the palace guards chase him through the streets of Agrabah, while Aladdin tells the audience that he must steal in order to survive and has to keep "one jump ahead" of his pursuers. While dodging Razoul and the palace guards, Aladdin climbs up buildings, ducks behind street performers, swings into a harem, and even attracts the attention of some of the street ladies of Agrabah. The reprise of the song takes place immediately after he and Abu go home, at which point he starts to question what his life has become and if there is a better future for him. In the second reprise, which only appears in the remake, Aladdin realizes that he can not keep playing Prince Ali and has to tell Princess Jasmine that he is not a prince, but a poor boy.

== Critical reception ==
AllMusic wrote "The manic "One Jump" and "Arabian Nights" are cut from the cloth of classic Broadway show tunes". The Star described it as a "clever number about what a good crook Aladdin is", and noted its "revelatory lyrics". The National Post said that in the Broadway version, "The movie's songs — One Jump Ahead, Friend Like Me and, best of all, Diamond in the Rough — come up fresh and sparkling".

== Certifications ==
Region	Certification	Certified units/sales
United Kingdom (BPI)	Silver	200,000^{‡}
United States (RIAA)	Platinum	1,000,000^{‡}
^{‡} Sales+streaming figures based on certification alone.
