= The Music Behind the Magic =

The Music Behind the Magic: The Musical Artistry of Alan Menken, Howard Ashman & Tim Rice

Box set by Various artists
- Released: November 22, 1994
- Recorded: 1987–1992
- Genre: Soundtrack
- Label: Walt Disney
- Producer: The Little Mermaid: Alan Menken; Howard Ashman; Robert Kraft; Beauty and the Beast: Alan Menken; Howard Ashman; Walter Afanasieff; Aladdin: Alan Menken; Tim Rice; Walter Afanasieff; Aladdin (The Original Score): Alan Menken; Howard Ashman

The Music Behind the Magic: The Musical Artistry of Alan Menken, Howard Ashman & Tim Rice is a four-disc box set highlighting the creative evolution behind the music of Disney's The Little Mermaid, Beauty and the Beast and Aladdin. Released on November 22, 1994 on Walt Disney Records, the set includes work tape recordings, demos, previously released final recordings, and unreleased master recordings of songs and score cues.

All 3 film soundtracks were later re-released with the complete score under the label "Walt Disney Records: The Legacy Collection" with The Little Mermaid in 2014, Beauty and the Beast in 2018, and Aladdin in 2022.

== Track listing ==
All music is composed by Alan Menken.

The Little Mermaid
No.	Title	Lyrics	Performed by:	Length
1.	"Fathoms Below, Main Titles" (demo)	Howard Ashman	Howard Ashman & Alan Menken	4:39
2.	"Fathoms Below" (final)	Ashman	Chorus	1:41
3.	"Main Titles" (final)		(score)	1:26
4.	"Fanfare" (final)		(score)	0:26
5.	"Daughters of Triton" (final)	Ashman	Chorus	0:37
6.	"Part of Your World" (work tape)	Ashman	Ashman & Menken	0:46
7.	"Part of Your World" (demo)	Ashman	Ashman & Menken	0:47
8.	"Part of Your World" (final)	Ashman	Jodi Benson	3:12
9.	"Fireworks" (final)		(score)	0:38
10.	"Jig" (final)		(score)	1:32
11.	"Under the Sea" (work tape)	Ashman	Ashman & Menken	1:20
12.	"Under the Sea" (demo)	Ashman	Ashman & Menken	2:32
13.	"Under the Sea" (final)	Ashman	Samuel E. Wright	3:12
14.	"Sebastian and Triton" (final)		(score)	1:41
15.	"Part of Your World, Reprise" (demo)	Ashman	Ashman & Menken	1:32
16.	"The Storm" (final)		(score)	3:18
17.	"Part of Your World, Reprise" (final)	Ashman	Benson	2:15
18.	"Silence Is Golden" (demo)	Ashman	Ashman & Menken	2:35
19.	"Poor Unfortunate Souls" (demo)	Ashman	Ashman & Menken	5:06
20.	"Poor Unfortunate Souls" (final)	Ashman	Pat Carroll	4:48
21.	"Les Poissons" (demo)	Ashman	Ashman & Menken	2:07
22.	"Les Poissons" (final)	Ashman	René Auberjonois	1:32
23.	"Tour of the Kingdom" (final)		(score)	1:24
24.	"Kiss the Girl" (demo)	Ashman	Ashman & Menken	1:05
25.	"Kiss the Girl" (final)	Ashman	Wright	1:35
26.	"Bedtime" (final)		(score)	1:20
27.	"Wedding Announcement" (final)		(score)	2:16
28.	"Eric to the Rescue" (final)		(score)	3:40
29.	"Part of Your World/Happy Ending" (work tape/final)	Ashman	Ashman & Menken/(score)	2:34
Total length:				62:43

Beauty and the Beast
No.	Title	Lyrics	Performed by:	Length
1.	"Belle" (demo/final)	Howard Ashman	Howard Ashman, Alan Menken/Paige O'Hara, Richard White	4:52
2.	"Prologue" (final/no dialogue)		(score)	2:31
3.	"Belle (Reprise)" (demo)	Ashman	Ashman & Menken	0:58
4.	"Belle (Reprise)" (final)	Ashman	O’Hara	1:04
5.	"Wolf Attack" (unreleased master)		(score)	2:39
6.	"Gaston" (demo)	Ashman	Ashman & Menken	3:39
7.	"Gaston" (final)	Ashman	Jesse Corti & White	3:37
8.	"Gaston (Reprise)" (demo)	Ashman	Ashman & Menken	2:28
9.	"Be Our Guest" (demo)	Ashman	Ashman & Menken	3:27
10.	"Be Our Guest" (final)	Ashman	Jerry Orbach & Angela Lansbury	3:42
11.	"West Wing" (final)		(score)	2:19
12.	"Human Again" (demo)	Ashman	Ashman & Menken	9:10
13.	"Something There" (final)	Ashman	O’Hara, Robby Benson, Orbach, Lansbury, David Ogden Stiers	2:16
14.	"The Mob Song" (final)	Ashman	White	3:27
15.	"Beauty and the Beast" (work tape)	Ashman	Ashman & Menken	1:43
16.	"Beauty and the Beast" (demo)	Ashman	Ashman & Menken	2:13
17.	"Beauty and the Beast" (final)	Ashman	Lansbury	2:44
18.	"The Beast Lets Belle Go" (final)		(score)	2:20
19.	"Transformation #1" (final)		(score)	1:35
20.	"Transformation #2" (final)		(score)	5:46
21.	"Beauty and the Beast" (single)	Ashman	Celine Dion & Peabo Bryson	4:02
Total length:				67:27

Aladdin
No.	Title	Lyrics	Performed by:	Length
1.	"Arabian Nights" (demo/final)	Howard Ashman	Alan Menken/Bruce Adler	1:48
2.	"Legend of the Lamp" (final/dialogue by Robin Williams)		(score)	1:24
3.	"On a Dark Night" (final)		(score)	2:54
4.	"One Jump Ahead" (final)	Tim Rice	Brad Kane	2:22
5.	"Street Urchins" (final)		(score)	1:56
6.	"One Jump Ahead, Reprise" (final)	Rice	Kane	1:00
7.	"Count on Me" (demo)	Alan Menken	Menken	2:38
8.	"Call Me a Princess" (demo)	Ashman	Howard Ashman & Menken	2:40
9.	"Jasmine Runs Away" (final)		(score)	0:44
10.	"Marketplace" (final)		(score)	2:36
11.	"Why Me" (unreleased master)	Rice	Jonathan Freeman	3:21
12.	"Friend Like Me" (work tape)	Ashman	Ashman & Menken	1:07
13.	"Friend Like Me" (final)	Ashman	Robin Williams	2:27
14.	"To Be Free" (final)		(score)	1:37
15.	"The Cave of Wonders" (final)		(score)	4:56
16.	"Prince Ali" (demo)	Ashman	Ashman & Menken	4:13
17.	"Prince Ali" (final)	Ashman	Williams	2:51
18.	"A Whole New World" (work tape)	Rice	Menken & Tim Rice	0:50
19.	"A Whole New World" (final)	Rice	Kane & Lea Salonga	2:39
20.	"The Kiss" (final)		(score)	1:50
21.	"Aladdin’s Word" (final)		(score)	1:51
22.	"Humiliate the Boy" (demo)	Ashman	Freeman & Menken	3:42
23.	"Jafar’s Hour" (final)		(score)	2:39
24.	"Prince Ali, Reprise" (final)	Rice	Freeman	1:12
25.	"The Ends of the Earth" (final)		(score)	1:35
26.	"The Battle" (final)		(score)	3:38
27.	"Happy End in Agrabah" (final)		(score)	4:14
28.	"Arabian Nights, Reprise" (unreleased master)	Ashman	Adler	0:44
29.	"A Whole New World (Aladdin’s Theme)" (single)	Rice	Peabo Bryson & Regina Belle	4:05
Total length:				70:44

Aladdin (The Original Score)
No.	Title	Lyrics	Performed by:	Length
1.	"Arabian Nights, Reprise #1" (demo)	Howard Ashman	Howard Ashman & Alan Menken	0:31
2.	"Babkak, Omar, Aladdin, Kassim" (demo)	Ashman	Ashman & Menken	2:45
3.	"Arabian Nights, Reprise #2" (demo)	Ashman	Ashman & Menken	0:32
4.	"Friend Like Me" (demo)	Ashman	Ashman & Menken	2:35
5.	"Proud of Your Boy" (demo)	Ashman	Ashman & Menken	2:27
6.	"How Quick They Forget" (demo)	Ashman	Ashman & Menken	3:57
7.	"Arabian Nights, Reprise #3" (demo)	Ashman	Ashman & Menken	0:34
8.	"High Adventure" (demo)	Ashman	Ashman & Menken	4:19
9.	"Arabian Nights, Reprise #4" (demo)	Ashman	Ashman & Menken	0:43
Total length:				18:47

== See also ==
- The Little Mermaid soundtrack
- Beauty and the Beast soundtrack
- Aladdin soundtrack
- Walt Disney Records
- Walt Disney Records: The Legacy Collection
