= One Jump Ahead =

One Jump Ahead may refer to:

- One Jump Ahead (film), a 1955 British film
- One Jump Ahead (novel), a 1972 Canadian novel
- One Jump Ahead, a 2007 science fiction novel by Mark L. Van Name
- One Jump Ahead (song), a 1992 song from Walt Disney's Aladdin
