= Prince Ali (song) =

1992 song from the Disney film Aladdin

Song by Robin Williams

from the album Aladdin: Original Motion Picture Soundtrack
- Released: October 31, 1992
- Genre: Show tune
- Length: 2:52
- Label: Walt Disney
- Composer: Alan Menken
- Lyricist: Howard Ashman
- Producer: Alan Menken

"Prince Ali" and its reprise are two musical numbers from the 1992 Disney animated film Aladdin. The first part was performed by Robin Williams in his role as the Genie and the reprise is performed by Jonathan Freeman in his role as Jafar. The song performed by Williams was nominated for the Golden Globe Award for Best Original Song at the 50th Golden Globe Awards in 1993.

== Production ==
The film version cut a conceived intro for the song and two extra verses in the middle of "Prince Ali".

Soundtrack.net explains how "Prince Ali (reprise)" was conceived:

"Humiliate the Boy" was the last song that Ashman wrote with Menken before he passed away. It was dropped because story elements and plots changed, but basically the scene features Jafar unmasking Prince Ali to be Aladdin, and completely embarrassing him in the process by abusing him with wishes (which worked differently in this older version of the story). So while this song was dropped, Alan Menken and new collaborator Tim Rice wrote a new song called "Why Me" in an effort to allow Jafar to keep a lengthy musical number. In the final film, this is all condensed down to the quick "Prince Ali (reprise)" track.

== Synopsis ==
"Prince Ali (Reprise)"

Song by Jonathan Freeman

from the album Aladdin: Original Motion Picture Soundtrack
- Released: October 31, 1992
- Genre: Show tune
- Length: 1:07
- Label: Walt Disney
- Composer: Alan Menken
- Lyricist: Tim Rice
- Producers: Alan Menken; Tim Rice

"Prince Ali" is a flamboyant number sung by the Genie (Robin Williams) as he introduces Agrabah to Prince Ali Ababwa, Aladdin's royal alter ego, with a giant caravan. A reprise of the song has Jafar (Jonathan Freeman) unmask Aladdin as a poor thief. An early reprise of the song in the stage musical has the Sultan announcing to the city's residents that his daughter Jasmine is to marry the prince.

== Cultural references ==
The Genie character is known for spouting elements of contemporary pop culture, and all his songs contain anachronistic references. During the song, Robin Williams imitates a Thanksgiving Parade commenter ("Don't they look lovely, June?"), Walter Brennan, and Ethel Merman.

== Critical reception ==
AllMusic wrote "Robin Williams' bravura performance as the magic lamp on songs such as "Friend Like Me" and "Prince Ali" are justifiably credited as the album's highlights."

Director/choreographer of the stage musical, Casey Nicholaw said that "'Prince Ali', too, is a huge production number 'where the dancers wear four costumes each'". TalkingBroadway described the song as one of the three showstoppers of the musical, along with "Friend Like Me" and "A Whole New World". NBC New York (WNBC-TV) dubbed it "Act II's standout".

== In popular culture ==
This song is playable in the video game Just Dance 2014.

Will Smith, as the Genie, performs the song in the 2019 live-action remake of Aladdin. This version incorporates some hip hop musical elements, and has made some changes to the lyrics. For example, "Sunday Salam" has been changed to "Friday Salam" to reflect the Islamic holy day. It omits reference to Prince Ali having slaves by changing it to stating that Ali has "ten thousand servants and flunkies". Smith also made anachronistic choices in the lyrics: "heard your princess was a sight, lovely to see" was changed to “heard your princess was hot, where is she?", and "he got dolled up" to "he got all cute". His signature laugh and other interjections were present throughout the song.

== Charts ==
Will Smith version

Chart (2019)	Peak position
New Zealand Hot Singles (RMNZ)	34
Scottish Singles Sales (Official Charts)	50
South Korea (Gaon)	44
US Bubbling Under Hot 100 (Billboard)	15

== Certifications ==
Will Smith version

Region	Certification	Certified units/sales
Mexico (AMPROFON)	Gold	30,000^{‡}
United Kingdom (BPI)	Silver	200,000^{‡}
United States (RIAA)	Gold	500,000^{‡}
^{‡} Sales+streaming figures based on certification alone.
