= Jonathan Freeman (actor) =

American actor and puppeteer (born 1950)

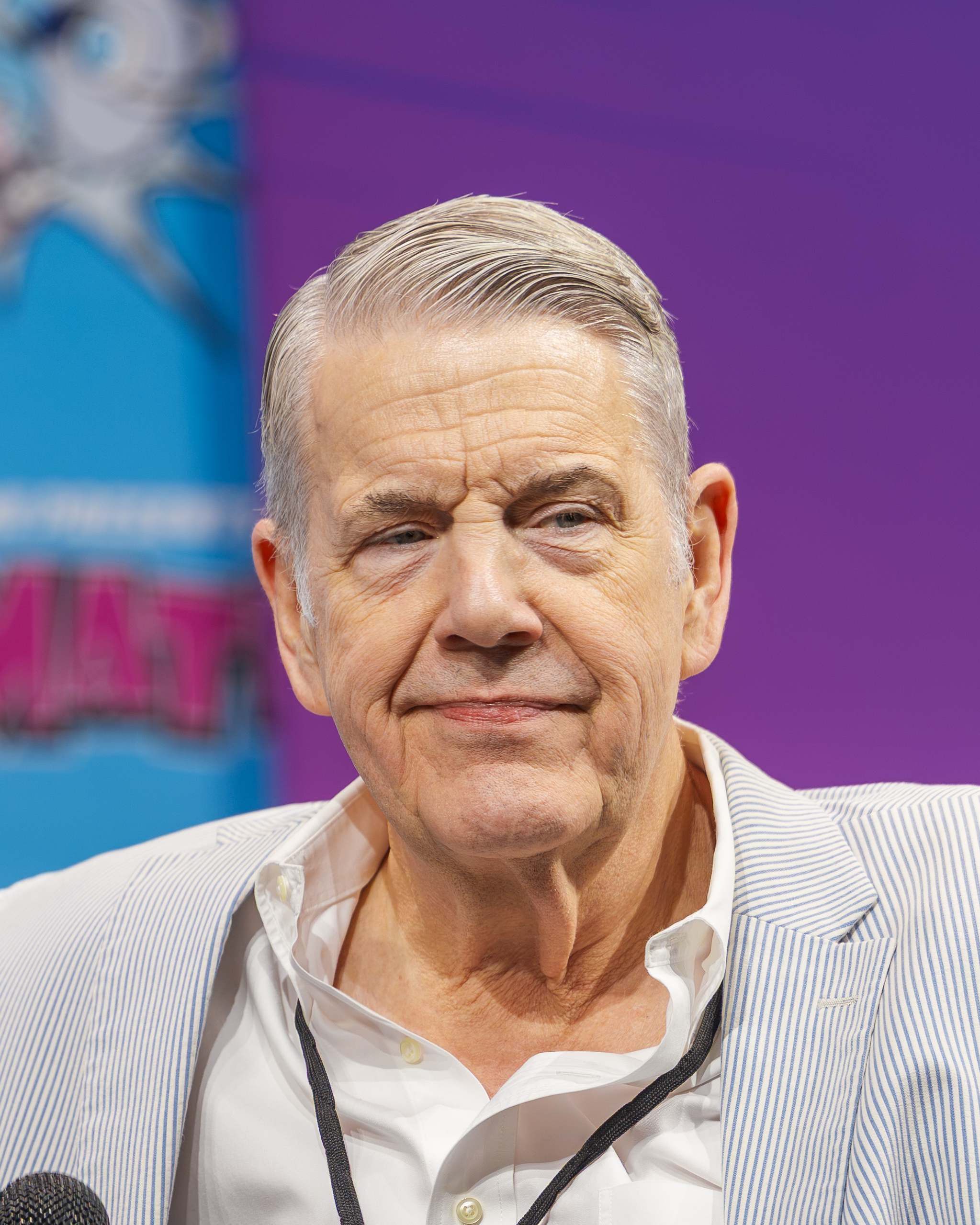
- Freeman at Animate! Columbus in 2026
- Born: February 5, 1950 (age 76); Bay Village, Ohio, U.S.
- Education: Ohio University
- Occupations: Actor; puppeteer
- Years active: 1972–present
- Spouse: Jace Coronado (m. 2016)

Jonathan Freeman (born February 5, 1950) is an American actor and puppeteer. He is known for voicing Jafar in Disney's Aladdin franchise, as well as the Kingdom Hearts franchise and the 2011 Aladdin musical.

== Early life ==
Freeman was born in Bay Village, Ohio on February 5, 1950. He graduated from Ohio University.

== Career ==
As well as being the voice of sorcerer Jafar in Aladdin, a role he once said he is called in to reprise every 3 to 6 months, Freeman is also known for being the puppeteer for Tito Swing of the Jukebox Band (Flexitoon Puppets) on the PBS series Shining Time Station. Freeman reprised his role as Jafar in the Aladdin sequel The Return of Jafar and the Hercules crossover episode "Hercules and the Arabian Night".

In 1994, he was nominated for a Tony Award for Best Featured Actor in a Musical for his role in She Loves Me. Additionally, he appeared in the Broadway revival productions of How to Succeed in Business Without Really Trying, The Producers, On the Town, and 42nd Street, during which his caricature was drawn for Sardi's restaurant in 2002.

Freeman can be heard on the 1997 Varèse Sarabande studio recording of the flop 1965 musical Drat! The Cat!.

He was also seen on stage as Cogsworth in Disney's Beauty and the Beast, and originated the role of Grimsby in Disney's Broadway production of The Little Mermaid.

Freeman began his run starring as Admiral Boom and the Bank Chairman in the Broadway production of Mary Poppins on December 12, 2009.

Freeman also reprised his role as Jafar in the musical adaptation of Aladdin, which played at Seattle's 5th Avenue Theatre from July 7–31, 2011. After nearly eight years with the show, Freeman played his final performance with the company on January 23, 2022.

== Filmography ==
=== Film ===
Year	Title	Role	Notes
1976	Let My Puppets Come	Madame (Puppetry and Voice) and The Chauffeur	Softcore Pornographic film
1987	Forever, Lulu	Don	
1988	Homeboy	Hotel Room Man	
1990	A Shock To The System	Decorator	
1992	Aladdin	Jafar (voice)	
1994	The Return of Jafar	Jafar (voice)	Direct-to-video
1995	Born to Be Wild	Ed Price	
1996	The Associate	Hockey Game Executive	
1997	The Ice Storm	Ted Franklin	
2001	Mickey's Magical Christmas: Snowed in at the House of Mouse	Jafar (voice)	Direct-to-video
2002	Mickey's House of Villains	Jafar (voice)	Direct-to-video
2007	The Hoax	Thick Voice (voice)	
2011	Too Big to Fail	Senator Richard Shelby	Television film
2016	Life, Animated	Himself	
2020	The High Note	Martin	
TBA	Aladdin: The Broadway Musical	Jafar	Filmed recording of 2019 West End musical

=== Television ===
Year	Title	Role	Notes
1989	K.I.D.S. TV News	D.J. McCaw	Unknown episodes
1989	The Days and Nights of Molly Dodd	Waiter #2	Episode: "Here's a Cute Way to Wrap up the Holiday Season"
1989–1995	Shining Time Station	Tito Swing	58 episodes
1990	Mathnet	Joshua	Episode: "The Case of the Unkidnapping"
1990	Shining Time Station: 'Tis a Gift	Tito Swing	Television special
1995	Aladdin on Ice	Jafar (voice)	Television special; uncredited
1996–1998	Remember WENN	Rollie Pruitt	6 episodes
1998	Hercules	Jafar (voice)	Episode: "Hercules and the Arabian Night"
2001–2003	House of Mouse	Jafar (voice)	10 episodes
2002	Teamo Supremo	Zomnambulist (voice)	Episode: "Things That Go Bump in the Night!"
2005–2006	American Dragon: Jake Long	Eli Excelsior Pandarus, Jack Frost (voice)	3 episodes
2008	Gossip Girl	Butler	Episode: "The Ex-Files"
2006–2009	Law & Order: Criminal Intent	Mr. Marty Krebs; Wallace Thayer	2 episodes
2010	Law & Order: Special Victims Unit	Bobby	Episode: "Merchandise"
2011	Submissions Only	Greg Bonomelli	Episode: "The Miller/Hennigan Act"
2016	Elementary	Holder	Episode: "How the Sausage Is Made"
2017	Oh My Disney Show: "Watch a Disney Movie With ... Aladdin's Jonathan Freeman"	Himself	S2, EP 34
2019	TODAY	Himself	Episode: "Jonathan Freeman, Voice of Jafar, Reveals A Secret To Playing Aladdin Villain"
2022	Helluva Boss	Paimon, Cash Buckzo (voice)	Episode: "The Circus"

=== Video games ===
Year	Title	Role	Notes
1994	Aladdin Activity Center	Jafar	
2001	Aladdin in Nasira's Revenge	Jafar	
2002	Kingdom Hearts	Jafar	
2005	Kingdom Hearts II	Jafar	
2007	Kingdom Hearts II: Final Mix+	Jafar	
2010	Kingdom Hearts Re:coded	Jafar	
2023	Disney Speedstorm	Jafar	
2023	Disney Dreamlight Valley	Jafar	
2026	Star Wars: Zero Company	Hawks (Male)	

=== Web ===
Year	Title	Role	Notes
2016	Broadway.com's Role Call: "Jonathan Freeman of Aladdin"	Himself	

=== Theme parks ===
Year	Title	Role	Notes
1998	Fantasmic!	Jafar	Voice

== Theatre work ==
=== Broadway credits ===
- Aladdin as Jafar (Original Broadway Cast)
- Mary Poppins as Admiral Boom and the Bank Chairman (Replacement)
- The Little Mermaid as Grimsby (Original Broadway Cast)
- Beauty and the Beast as Cogsworth (Replacement)
- The Producers as Roger De Bris (Replacement)
- 42nd Street as Bert Barry
- On the Town as Pitkin W. Bridgework
- How to Succeed in Business Without Really Trying as Mr. Bratt
- She Loves Me as Headwaiter – Nominated – Tony Award for Best Featured Actor in a Musical
- Platinum as Minky
- Sherlock Holmes as Lightfoot McTague (Replacement – RSC Transfer)

=== Off Broadway credits ===
His Off Broadwat credits include:

- Of Thee I Sing as Senator Lyons (City Center Encores)
- Finian's Rainbow as Finian (Irish Repertory)
- A Class Act as Lehman (Manhattan Theatre Club)
- An Empty Plate In The Cafe Du Grand Boeuf as Claude (Primary Stages)
- Sail Away as Joe (Carnegie Hall)
- Wall To Wall as Frank Loesser (Symphony Space)
- Li'l Abner as Dr. Rasmussen (City Center Encores)
- On The Town as Pitkin W. Bridgework (Public Theater/Delacourte)
- In A Pig's Valise as Zoot/Gut (Second Stage)
- Claptrap as Harvey (Manhattan Theater Club)
- Bertrano as Louie/Momo (Primary Stages)
- Confessions Of Billie as Conrad Gerhardt (Performing Garage)
- Thirteen Days To Broadway as Cy (890 Studios)
- Babes In Arms as Steve (Playwrights' Horizon)
- Pinocchio as Fire Eater (Marionette Theater)
- The Miser as Cleante (Greenwich Mews)
- Le Bourgeois gentilhomme as Dancing Master

=== Regional/Stock credits ===
- Restoration Comedy as Sir Novelty (Seattle Repertory Theater)
- A Christmas Carol as Ebenezer Scrooge (Bay Street Theater)
- You Can't Take It with You as Boris Kolenkov (Bay Street Theater)
- An Empty Plate In The Cafe Du Grand Boeuf as Claude (Berkshire Theater Festival)
- Peter Pan as Hook/Mr. Darling (Austin Musical Theater)
- How To Succeed in Business Without Really Trying as Bert Bratt (La Jolla Playhouse)
- Fortinbras as Claudius (La Jolla Playhouse)
- Babes In Toyland as Gonzorgo (Houston Grand Opera)
- A Funny Thing Happened on the Way to the Forum as Marcus Lycus (La Jolla Playhouse/Orange County Performing Arts Center)
- The Flowering Peach as Shem (Coconut Grove Playhouse)
- Emigration Of Adam as Issac Kurtzik (Williamstown Theater Festival)
- Gay Divorce as Teddy (Goodspeed Opera House)
- The Student Prince as Hubert (Milwaukee Melody Top)
- Can-Can as Boris
- Arsenic and Old Lace as Jonathan (Meadowbrook Theater)
- The Desert Song as Benny (Coachlight Theater)
- George Washington Slept Here as Steve (Berkshire Theater Festival)
- How to Succeed in Business Without Really Trying as Bud Frump (Coachlight Theater)

== Soundtrack ==
Year	Artist/Writer	Song	Film	Role
1989	Kevin Roth	"Cosher Bailey's Engine" "Camptown Races" "Jesse James" "Celito Lindo" "No Business like Show Business" "Polly Wolly Doodle" "The Desperado" "Home on the Range" "Jamaican Farewell" "Born on the Fourth of July"	Shining Time Station	Tito Swing
1990	Lydia Maria Child	"'Tis A Gift"	Shining Time Station: 'Tis a Gift	Tito Swing
1992	Alan Menken & Howard Ashman	"Prince Ali Reprise" "Humiliate the Boy" "Why Me?"	Aladdin	Jafar
1994	Alan Menken & Howard Ashman	"You're Only Second Rate"	The Return of Jafar	Jafar
2001	Randy Petersen & Kevin Quinn	"It's Our House Now"	Mickey's House of Villains	Jafar
