= Aladdin (1992 Disney film) =

1992 animated Disney film

- Theatrical release poster by John Alvin
- Directed by: John Musker; Ron Clements
- Screenplay by: Ron Clements; John Musker; Ted Elliott; Terry Rossio
- Story by: Burny Mattinson; Roger Allers; Daan Jippes; Kevin Harkey; Sue Nichols; Francis Glebas; Darrell Rooney; Larry Leker; James Fujii; Kirk Hanson; Kevin Lima; Rebecca Rees; David S. Smith; Chris Sanders; Brian Pimental; Patrick A. Ventura
- Based on: "Aladdin and the Magic Lamp" from One Thousand and One Nights (Note: "Aladdin and the Magic Lamp" was authored by Hanna Diyab; it was added to the One Thousand and One Nights by Antoine Galland, appearing in his French translation Les mille et une nuits.)
- Produced by: John Musker; Ron Clements
- Starring: Scott Weinger; Robin Williams; Linda Larkin; Jonathan Freeman; Frank Welker; Gilbert Gottfried; Douglas Seale
- Edited by: H. Lee Peterson
- Music by: Alan Menken
- Production company: Walt Disney Feature Animation (Note: The 2019 reissue was produced under its current name, Walt Disney Animation Studios.)
- Distributed by: Buena Vista Pictures Distribution (Note: Distributed under the Walt Disney Pictures banner.)
- Release date: November 11, 1992
- Running time: 90 minutes
- Country: United States
- Language: English
- Budget: $28 million
- Box office: $504 million

Aladdin is a 1992 American animated musical fantasy film based on the Middle Eastern folk tale "Aladdin" from One Thousand and One Nights and produced by Walt Disney Feature Animation. The film was produced and directed by John Musker and Ron Clements, both of whom co-wrote the screenplay with Ted Elliott and Terry Rossio. Featuring the voices of Scott Weinger, Robin Williams, Linda Larkin, Jonathan Freeman, Frank Welker, Gilbert Gottfried, and Douglas Seale, the film follows an Arabian street urchin named Aladdin, who discovers a magic lamp containing a genie, with whose help he disguises himself as a wealthy Prince and tries to impress the Sultan of Agrabah to win the heart of his free-spirited daughter, Princess Jasmine, as the Sultan's evil vizier, Jafar, plots to steal the magic lamp.

Lyricist Howard Ashman pitched the film's idea to Disney president Jeffrey Katzenberg and the screenplay went through three drafts before Katzenberg agreed to its production. The animators based their designs on the work of caricaturist Al Hirschfeld, and computers were used to both finish the hand-drawn artwork and create some additional animated elements. Composed by Alan Menken, the film's musical score features six songs with lyrics written by both Ashman and Tim Rice (who took over following Ashman's death in 1991).

Aladdin was released by Buena Vista Pictures Distribution through the Walt Disney Pictures banner on November 11, 1992, to critical and commercial success. Critics praised the animation and Williams' performance as the Genie, and it became the highest-grossing film of the year, with an earning of over $504 million in worldwide box-office revenue. On release, the film became the first animated feature to reach the half-billion-dollar mark, and was the fifth highest-grossing film at the time of its release and the highest-grossing animated feature of all time until it was surpassed by The Lion King (1994).

Aladdin garnered two Academy Awards, as well as other accolades for its soundtrack, which had the first number from a Disney feature to earn a Grammy Award for Song of the Year, for the theme song "A Whole New World", which was performed by Peabo Bryson and Regina Belle and reached number one on the US Billboard Hot 100. The film's home VHS release set a sales record, grossing approximately $500 million in the United States. Aladdin's success led to various derived works and other material inspired by the film, including two direct-to-video sequels, The Return of Jafar (1994) and Aladdin and the King of Thieves (1996); an animated television series (1994–1995); and in 2011 a stage musical adaptation. A live-action film adaptation directed by Guy Ritchie was released in 2019.

== Plot ==
Jafar, a sorcerer and the royal vizier of the fictional Middle Eastern city of Agrabah, seeks a magic lamp hidden within the Cave of Wonders that only "the diamond in the rough" can retrieve. Meanwhile, Princess Jasmine is unsatisfied with her sheltered life in the palace, so she escapes in disguise and encounters a young kind-hearted street urchin named Aladdin, who steals bread daily alongside his pet monkey Abu. Aladdin rescues Jasmine from an altercation in the marketplace and the two develop a bond, but Jafar has the palace guards capture and imprison Aladdin, who learns Jasmine's identity. Jasmine demands that Jafar release Aladdin, but he lies that Aladdin has already been beheaded.

Understanding Aladdin to be the "diamond in the rough", Jafar disguises himself as an elderly beggar, frees Aladdin and Abu and orders them to retrieve the lamp from the cave. The cave's guardian grants Aladdin entry, but warns him to touch only the lamp. Aladdin finds both the lamp and a flying magic carpet inside, but Abu grabs a large jewel and triggers a cave-in. They flee to the entrance and give the lamp to Jafar, who attempts to kill Aladdin, but throws the pair into the cave after Abu bites his hand. While trapped underground, Abu reveals to Aladdin that he stole the lamp back. Aladdin rubs the lamp, from which the Genie emerges. The Genie grants Aladdin three wishes, although Aladdin tricks him into freeing them from the cave without using a wish. Upon learning the Genie's desire to be released from servitude, Aladdin promises to use his last wish to free him. To woo Jasmine, Aladdin uses his first wish to become a prince.

Jafar plans to marry Jasmine and then kill both her and her father, the Sultan. Meanwhile, Aladdin arrives in Agrabah as "Prince Ali Ababwa," but Jasmine is uninterested in his advances. That night, Aladdin takes Jasmine on a romantic ride on the carpet. After she deduces that Aladdin is the boy she had met earlier, he lies that he sometimes dresses as a commoner to escape palace life. Aladdin brings Jasmine home, but Jafar's guards ambush him and throw him into the sea, where the Genie uses Aladdin's second wish to rescue him. Returning to the palace, Aladdin reveals Jafar's plot to Jasmine and the Sultan, but Jafar realizes Aladdin's identity and escapes from the guards.

With everything seemingly resolved, the Genie requests his freedom; Aladdin declines, worried that he needs the Genie's facade to stay with Jasmine. The heart-broken Genie retreats into his lamp, which is later stolen and brought to Jafar by his parrot sidekick, Iago. Now the Genie's master, Jafar uses his first two wishes to become sultan, then the world's most powerful sorcerer, before sending Aladdin to a frozen wasteland. Using the magic carpet, Aladdin escapes and returns to Agrabah, where he fights Jafar for the lamp. Aladdin taunts Jafar for being less powerful than the Genie, tricking him into using his last wish to become a genie himself. This causes Jafar to become trapped in his new lamp, taking Iago with him. The Genie throws Jafar's lamp into the Cave of Wonders.

The Genie encourages Aladdin to use his third wish to regain his royal title and legally marry Jasmine. Aladdin instead decides to keep his promise, wishing the Genie free, and they both reconcile afterwards. The Sultan allows Jasmine to marry whomever she chooses, and she gladly chooses Aladdin. The Genie bids the group a fond farewell and leaves to explore the world, while Aladdin and Jasmine start their new life together.

== Voice cast ==
- Scott Weinger as Aladdin, an impoverished but kind-hearted Agrabah thief and street urchin who is in love with Princess Jasmine. For his audition, Weinger sent a homemade audition tape as Aladdin, with his mother playing the Genie, and after several callbacks, found out six months later that he had been cast as the title character. Aladdin's supervising animator was Glen Keane.
  - Brad Kane provides Aladdin's singing voice.
- Robin Williams as the Genie, a hyperactive jinn who has the power to grant three wishes to whoever possesses his magic lamp. He serves as the film's comic relief. Clements and Musker had written the role of the Genie for Robin Williams, but when met with resistance, created a reel of Williams's stand-up animation of the Genie. The directors asked Eric Goldberg, the Genie's supervising animator, to animate the character over one of Williams's old stand-up comedy routines to pitch the idea to the actor. The resulting test, in which Williams's stand-up about schizophrenia was translated to the Genie growing another head to argue with himself, made Williams "laugh his ass off", and convinced him to sign for the role. Williams's appearance in Aladdin marked the beginning of a transition in animation to use celebrity voice actors rather than specifically trained voice actors.
  - Williams also voices a peddler who appears at the beginning of the film, whom the directors intended to be the same Genie in disguise narrating the story. The peddler's singing voice was provided by Bruce Adler.
- Linda Larkin as Jasmine, the beautiful and free-spirited princess of Agrabah and the daughter of the Sultan who is bored with life in the royal palace and falls in love with Aladdin. Larkin was chosen for the role of Jasmine nine months after her audition, and had to adjust and lower her high-pitched voice to reach the voice that the filmmakers were looking for in the character. Jasmine's supervising animator was Mark Henn.
  - Lea Salonga provides Jasmine's singing voice.
- Jonathan Freeman as Jafar, a nefarious, deceptive, power-hungry sorcerer and the grand vizier of Agrabah who, frustrated with the Sultan's ways of ruling, devises a dastardly plot to overthrow him as the ruler of Agrabah by acquiring the Genie's lamp. Freeman was the first actor cast, and spent 21 months recording his dialogue. He eventually readjusted his voice after Weinger and Larkin were cast, as he felt that "Jafar had to be seen as a real threat to Aladdin and Jasmine", as he was originally envisioned as an irritable character, but the directors decided that a calm villain would be scarier. Jafar's supervising animator was Andreas Deja, while Jafar's beggar and snake forms were animated by Kathy Zielinski.
- Frank Welker as Abu, Aladdin's kleptomaniac pet monkey with a falsetto voice. Welker also voices Jasmine's tiger, Rajah, and the Cave of Wonders. Duncan Marjoribanks was the supervising animator for Abu, Aaron Blaise was the supervising animator for Rajah, and Goldberg was the supervising animator for the Cave of Wonders.
- Gilbert Gottfried as Iago, Jafar's sardonic, hot-tempered red lory sidekick. Will Finn was the supervising animator for Iago.
- Douglas Seale as the Sultan, the naïve but friendly ruler of Agrabah who is eager to find a capable husband for his daughter Jasmine. The Sultan's supervising animator was David Pruiksma.
- Jim Cummings as Razoul: the Captain of the Guards. Phil Young and Chris Wahl animated him and the other guards.
- Charlie Adler as Gazeem: a thief who Jafar sends into the Cave of Wonders at the beginning of the film. Gazeem was animated by T. Daniel Hofstedt.
- Corey Burton as Prince Achmed: an arrogant prince whom Jasmine rejects as a suitor.

== Production ==
=== Script and development ===
In 1988, lyricist Howard Ashman had pitched the idea of an animated musical adaptation of Aladdin. Ashman had written a 40-page film treatment, remaining faithful to the plot and characters of the original story but envisioned as a campy 1930s-style musical with a popular 1930s-style Genie. With his partner, Alan Menken, Ashman composed several songs and added original characters to the story, such as Aladdin's friends, Babkak, Omar and Kassim.

However, Michael Eisner did not think that a story set in the Middle East would be commercially appealing, and their project was removed from active development. Ashman and Menken were soon recruited to compose songs for Beauty and the Beast. Linda Woolverton, who had also worked on Beauty and the Beast, used their treatment and developed a draft with elements inspired by The Thief of Bagdad, such as a villain named Jaf'far, an aged sidekick retired human thief named Abu, and a human handmaiden for the princess.

Directors Ron Clements and John Musker joined the production, picking Aladdin from three projects offered; the other two were an adaptation of Swan Lake and King of the Jungle, which eventually became The Lion King. Before Ashman's death in March 1991, he and Menken composed "Arabian Nights", "Friend Like Me", "Prince Ali" and Ashman's last song, "Humiliate the Boy".

Musker and Clements wrote a draft of the screenplay, and delivered a story reel to studio chief Jeffrey Katzenberg in April 1991. Katzenberg thought that the script "didn't engage", and on a day known by the staff as "Black Friday", he demanded that the entire story be rewritten without rescheduling the film's November 25, 1992, release date. Katzenberg requested for Clements and Musker to not be heavily dependent on Ashman's vision, and the removal of Aladdin's mother, remarking: "Eighty-six the mother. The mom's a zero."

Katzenberg also influenced changing the plot element about Jasmine's marriage, which originally had her to be married by age sixteen as required by law, to remove the age—the Sultan says only, "your next birthday"—and make it more specific that her suitor needed to be a prince, which would also set up the ending in which the Sultan, inspired by Aladdin's altruism, changes the law to make it legal for Jasmine to able to marry anyone she deems worthy.

Screenwriting duo Ted Elliott and Terry Rossio were brought in to rework the story, and the changes they made included the removal of Aladdin's mother, the strengthening of the character of Princess Jasmine, and the deletion of several of Ashman and Menken's songs. Aladdin's personality was rewritten to be "a little rougher, like a young Harrison Ford"; the parrot, Iago, originally conceived as an uptight British archetype, was reworked to a comic role after the filmmakers saw Gilbert Gottfried in Beverly Hills Cop II, who was cast for the role. By October 1991, Katzenberg was satisfied with the new version of Aladdin. As with Woolverton's screenplay, several characters and plot elements were based on The Thief of Bagdad, although the location of the film was changed from Baghdad to the fictional Arabian city of Agrabah due to the Gulf War. Because the war prevented them from travelling to Baghdad for research, most of their research took place at the Saudi Arabian expo at the Los Angeles Convention Center.

According to a 1994 article in The Advocate, Katzenberg asked Thomas Schumacher, an openly gay producer, if any of the gay references in the film offended him, such as a scene in which the Genie becomes an "effeminate clothier", and another in which he tells Aladdin: "I really like you too, kid, but that doesn't mean I want to pick out curtains with you." Schumacher responded that such references were in "good fun", remarking: "I know we all argue amongst ourselves, but why try to deny the fact that swishy fashion designers exist? They do! What are we running from? Show me ten hairdressers; I'll show you eight gay men."

=== Design and animation ===
Style guide depicting the main characters. The animators designed each character based on a different geometrical shape.

The design for most characters is based on the work of caricaturist Al Hirschfeld, which production designer Richard Vander Wende also considered appropriate to the theme, due to similarities to the flowing and swooping lines found in Arabic calligraphy. Jafar's design was not based on Hirschfeld's work, because Jafar's supervising animator, Andreas Deja, wanted the character to be contrasting. Each character was animated alone, with the animators consulting with each other to make scenes with interrelating characters.

Because Aladdin's animator, Glen Keane, was working in the California branch of Walt Disney Feature Animation, and Jasmine's animator, Mark Henn, was in Florida at Disney-MGM Studios, they had to frequently phone, fax or send designs and discs to each other. The animators filmed monkeys at the San Francisco Zoo to study their movements for Abu's character. Iago's supervising animator, Will Finn, tried to incorporate some aspects of Gottfried's appearance into the parrot's design, especially his semi-closed eyes and the always-appearing teeth. Some aspects of the Sultan were inspired by the Wizard of Oz, to create a bumbling authority figure.

Andreas Deja, Jafar's supervising animator, tried to incorporate Jonathan Freeman's facial expressions and gesturing into the character. Animator Randy Cartwright described working on the Magic Carpet as challenging, since it is only a rectangular shape that expresses itself through pantomime—"It's sort of like acting by origami". Cartwright kept folding a piece of cloth while animating to see how to position the Carpet. After the character animation was done, the carpet's surface design was applied digitally.

"In early screenings, we played with him being a little bit younger, and he had a mother in the story. [...] In design he became more athletic-looking, more filled out, more of a young leading man, more of a teen-hunk version than before."

— John Musker on Aladdin's early design

Designed by a team led by supervising animator Glen Keane, Aladdin was initially going to be as young as thirteen, and was originally made to resemble actor Michael J. Fox. During production, it was decided that the design was too boyish and lacked appeal, so the character was made "seventeen to eighteen", and redesigned to add elements derived from actor Tom Cruise and Calvin Klein models.

For the scenery design, various architectural elements seen in 19th-century orientalist paintings and photographs of the Arab world were used for guidance. Other inspirations for design were Disney's animated films from the 1940s and '50s and the 1940 film The Thief of Bagdad. The coloring was done with the computerized CAPS process, and the color motifs were chosen according to the personality—the protagonists use light colors, such as blue, the antagonists darker ones, such as red and black, and Agrabah and its palace use the neutral color, yellow. Computer animation was used for several elements of the film, such as the tiger entrance of the Cave of Wonders and the scene in which Aladdin tries to escape the collapsing cave. Some of the software that was used was Pixar's RenderMan.

Musker and Clements created the Genie with Robin Williams in mind; although Katzenberg suggested actors such as John Candy, Steve Martin and Eddie Murphy, Williams was approached and eventually accepted the role. Williams came for voice recording sessions during breaks while filming two films he was making at the time, Hook and Toys. Unusual for an animated film, much of Williams's dialogue was ad-libbed. For some scenes, Williams was given topics and dialogue suggestions, but allowed to improvise his lines. It is estimated that Williams improvised 52 characters. Eric Goldberg, the supervising animator for the Genie, reviewed Williams' recorded dialogue and selected the best lines to animate.

The producers added many in-jokes and references to Disney's previous works in the film, such as a "cameo appearance" from directors, Clements and Musker, and drawing some characters based on Disney workers. Beast, Sebastian and Pinocchio make brief appearances, and the wardrobe of the Genie at the end of the film—a Goofy hat, a Hawaiian shirt, and sandals—are a reference to a short film that Robin Williams did for the Disney-MGM Studios tour in the late 1980s.

=== Robin Williams's conflicts with the studio ===
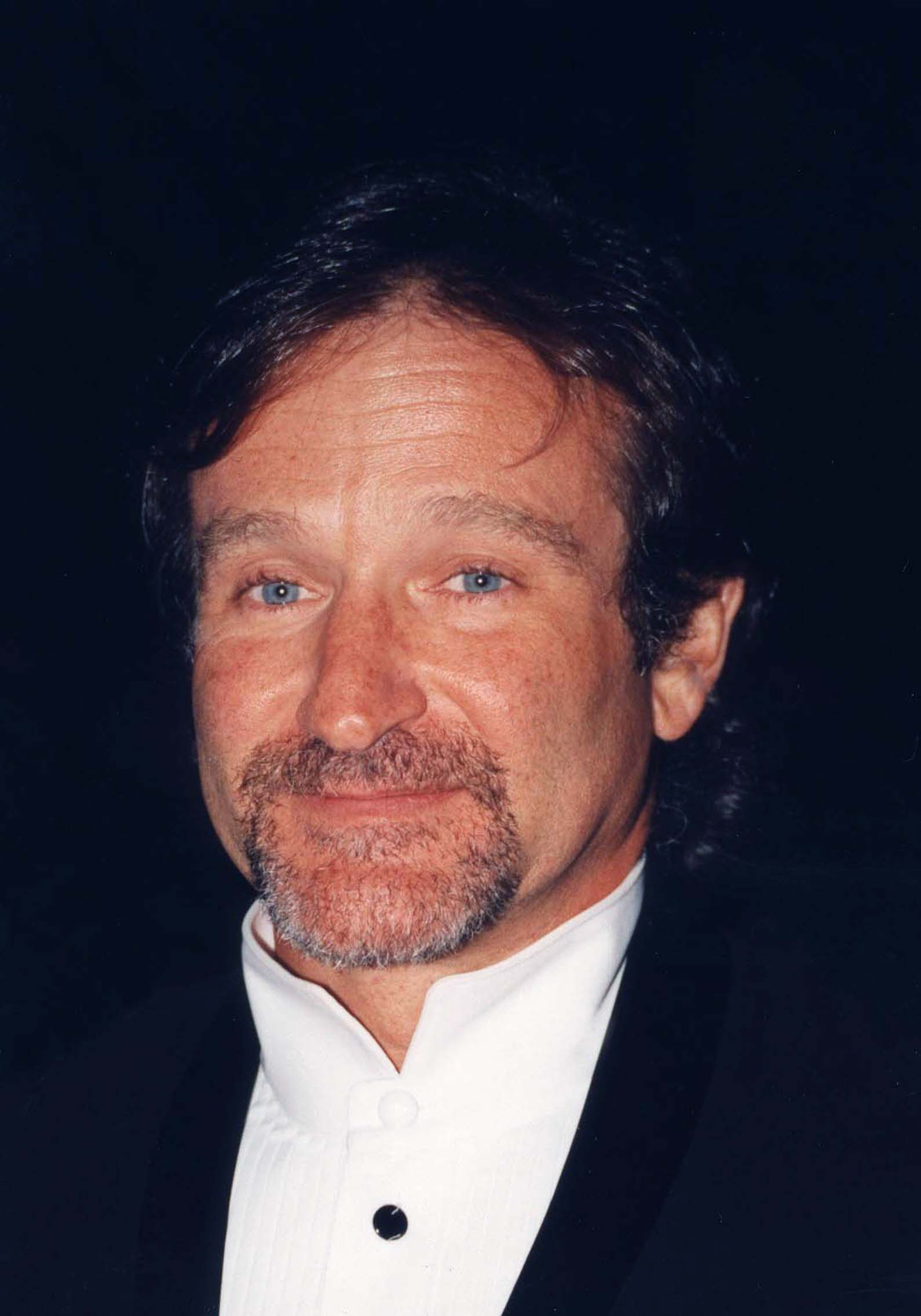
Initially, Robin Williams voiced the Genie under the condition that his voice not be used for excessive marketing or merchandising.

In gratitude for his success with Touchstone Pictures's Good Morning, Vietnam, Robin Williams voiced the Genie for SAG scale pay ($75,000) instead of his usual asking fee of $8 million, on the condition that neither his name nor image be used for marketing, and that his character take no more than 25% of space on advertising artwork, since Williams's film Toys was scheduled for release one month following Aladdin's debut. For financial reasons, the studio reneged on both counts, especially in poster art, by having the Genie in 25% of the image but having other major and supporting characters portrayed considerably smaller. The Disney Hyperion book, Aladdin: The Making of an Animated Film, lists both of Williams's characters, "the Peddler" and "the Genie", ahead of main characters, but was forced to refer to him as only "the actor signed to play the Genie".

Disney, while not using Williams' name in commercials as per the contract, used his voice for the Genie in the commercials and used the Genie character to sell toys and fast food tie-ins, without having to pay Williams additional money. Williams unhappily quipped at the time, "You realize when you work for Disney why the mouse has only four fingers--because he can't pick up a check." Williams explained to New York magazine that his previous Mork & Mindy merchandising was different because "the image is theirs. But the voice, that's me; I gave them myself. When it happened, I said, 'You know I don't do that.' And they [Disney] apologized; they said it was done by other people."

Disney attempted to assuage Williams by sending him a Pablo Picasso painting worth more than $1 million, but this move failed to repair the damaged relationship, as the painting was a self-portrait of Picasso as Vincent van Gogh, and apparently really "clashed" with the Williams's wilder home decor. Williams refused to sign for the 1994 direct-to-video sequel The Return of Jafar, and he was replaced by Dan Castellaneta as the Genie's voice actor. When Jeffrey Katzenberg was replaced by Joe Roth as chairman at Walt Disney Studios, Roth organized a public apology to Williams. In turn, Williams would reprise the role in the second sequel, Aladdin and the King of Thieves, in 1996.

=== Music ===
Aladdin was the third—after The Little Mermaid and Beauty and the Beast—and final Disney film that Alan Menken and Howard Ashman had collaborated on, with Tim Rice (who later wrote the songs for the studio's next film The Lion King) as lyricist after Ashman had died in March 1991. Although fourteen songs were written for Aladdin, only seven are featured in the film, three by Ashman and four by Rice. Menken, Ashman and Rice were praised for creating a soundtrack that is "consistently good, rivaling the best of Disney's other animated musicals from the '90s".

The Special Edition soundtrack released in 2004 included four songs in early animation tests and a music video of one, "Proud of Your Boy", performed by Clay Aiken, which also appears on the album, Disneymania 3. The pop duo version of the song, "A Whole New World", performed by Peabo Bryson and Regina Belle, which plays over the end credits, is, as of 2024, the only Disney song to win a Grammy Award for Song of the Year.

== Themes ==
"The original story was sort of a winning the lottery kind of thing ... Like having anything you could wish for would be the greatest thing in the world and having it taken away from you is bad, but having it back is great. We didn't really want that to be the message of the movie."

— Ron Clements

The filmmakers thought that the moral message of the original tale was inappropriate, and decided to "put a spin on it" by making the fulfillment of wishes seem like a great solution, but eventually becoming a problem. Another major theme was avoiding an attempt to be what the person is not—both Aladdin and Jasmine get into trouble pretending to be different people, and Prince Ali's persona fails to impress Jasmine, who falls for Aladdin only when she finds out who he truly is. Themes of imprisonment—a fate that befalls most of the film's characters—are also presented. Aladdin and Jasmine are limited by their lifestyles, while the Genie is attached to his lamp, and Jafar to the Sultan, being represented visually by the prison-like walls and bars of the Agrabah palace and the scene involving caged birds, which Jasmine eventually frees. Jasmine is also depicted as a different type of Disney Princess, being rebellious against the royal life and the social structure.

== Release ==
=== Box office ===
A large promotion campaign preceded Aladdin's debut in theaters, with the film's trailer attached to most Disney VHS releases (including One Hundred and One Dalmatians in April 1992 and Beauty and the Beast in October that year), and numerous tie-ins and licensees being released. Aladdin was released on November 11, 1992, in two theaters (the El Capitan Theatre in Los Angeles and the City Cinemas 1, 2 and 3rd Avenue in New York City), and grossed $196,664 in its first 5 days. The film expanded to 1,131 theaters on November 25, 1992, grossing $19.2 million for the weekend, finishing second at the U.S. box office, behind Home Alone 2: Lost in New York. It took eight weeks for the film to surpass Beauty and the Beast as the most successful animated Disney film at the domestic box office (surpassed by The Lion King in 1994).

For its eighth week of release, Aladdin collected $15.6 million and reached the number one spot at the box office, beating A Few Good Men. By February 1993, it surpassed Batman Returns to become the highest-grossing 1992 film domestically. In the United States, the film held the top spot five times weekly and breaks the record for the week between Christmas and New Year's Eve, with $32.2 million during its 22-week run. Aladdin was the most successful film of 1992, grossing $217 million in the United States, and over $504 million worldwide. It was the biggest gross for an animated film until The Lion King two years later, and was the first full-length animated film to gross $200 million in the United States and Canada. Additionally, it was the first film to cross that mark since Terminator 2: Judgment Day.

Outside of the United States and Canada, the film grossed $200 million in 1993, and $250 million by January 1994. In Europe, Aladdin defeated Jurassic Park to become the continent's box-office leader for the week of November 26, 1993. It set an opening weekend record in South Africa. By 2002, the film grossed $287 million overseas and $504 million worldwide. It sold an estimated 52.4 million tickets in the United States and Canada. When adjusted for inflation (in 2022 dollars), its domestic gross totaled $491.4 million.

=== Home media ===
The film was first released in VHS on September 29, 1993, as part of the Walt Disney Classics line, although it was not officially advertised until October 1. In its first three days of availability, Aladdin sold 10.8 million copies, setting the fastest sales record and grossing about $265,000,000 (equivalent to $591,000,000 in 2025) in the United States. In less than three weeks, the VHS release of Aladdin sold more than 16 million units and grossed over $400,000,000 (equivalent to $890,000,000 in 2025) in the United States. On release of the Sega Genesis video game adaptation in November, Aladdin sold approximately 30 million home video units, earning more than $500,000,000 (equivalent to $1,110,000,000 in 2025) in the United States. It was the best-selling home video release until a record broken by The Lion King. This VHS edition entered moratorium on April 30, 1994. A THX-certified widescreen LaserDisc was issued on September 21, 1994, and a Spanish-dubbed VHS for the American market was released on April 14, 1995. In Japan, 2.2 million home video units were sold by 1995.

On October 5, 2004, Aladdin was re-released onto VHS and for the first time released on DVD, as part of Disney's Platinum Edition line. The DVD release featured the movie and a second disc with bonus features. Accompanied by a $19 million marketing campaign, the DVD sold about 3 million units in its first month. The film's soundtrack was available in its original Dolby 5.1 track or in a new Disney Enhanced Home Theater Mix. The DVD went into moratorium in January 2008 with its sequels.

Walt Disney Studios Home Entertainment released the film on a Diamond Edition Blu-ray on October 13, 2015. The film was released on Digital HD on September 29, 2015. In its first week of release on home media in the United States, the film topped the Blu-ray sales chart and debuted at number 2 at the Nielsen VideoScan First Alert chart, which tracks overall disc sales behind the disaster film, San Andreas. The film's Blu-ray release sold 1.81 million units and grossed $39 million, as of 2017.

Aladdin was re-released on HD and 4K digital download on August 27, 2019, with a physical media re-release on Blu-ray and Ultra HD Blu-ray on September 10, 2019, as part of the Walt Disney Signature Collection.

== Reception ==
=== Critical reception ===
Upon release, Aladdin received positive reviews from film critics. The review aggregator website, Rotten Tomatoes, reports that 96% of 130 critics give the film a positive review, with an average rating of 8.6/10. The site's consensus reads: "A highly entertaining entry in Disney's renaissance era, Aladdin is beautifully drawn, with near-classic songs and a cast of scene-stealing characters." On Metacritic, the film has a weighted average score of 86 out of 100, based on 25 critics, indicating "universal acclaim". Audiences polled by CinemaScore gave the film a rare "A+" grade, on a scale of A+ to F.

Most critics praised Robin Williams's performance as the Genie, with Janet Maslin of The New York Times declaring that children "needn't know precisely what Mr. Williams is evoking to understand how funny he is". Brian Lowry of Variety praised the cast of characters, describing the expressive magic carpet as "its most remarkable accomplishment", and considered that "Aladdin overcomes most story flaws thanks to sheer technical virtuosity".

Peter Travers of Rolling Stone stated that the film's comedic aspect made it accessible to both children and adults, a vision shared with Desson Howe of The Washington Post, who also said that "kids are still going to be entranced by the magic and adventure". Warner Bros. Cartoons director Chuck Jones called the film "the funniest feature ever made", and James Berardinelli gave the film three and a half stars out of four, praising the "crisp visuals and wonderful song-and-dance numbers".

Roger Ebert of the Chicago Sun-Times awarded the film 3 stars out of 4, and commented that Williams and animation "were born for one another." However, he considered the music to be inferior to The Little Mermaid and Beauty and the Beast, and claimed that Aladdin and Jasmine were "pale and routine". He criticized what he saw as the film's use of ethnic stereotypes, writing, "Most of the Arab characters have exaggerated facial characteristics—hooked noses, glowering brows, thick lips—but Aladdin and the princess look like white American teenagers." Olly Richards of Empire Magazine awarded the film 5 stars out of 5, and said "The movie that brought a hip new sensibility to animated features and which still stands up in the age of Pixar and DreamWorks thanks largely to a blistering improv turn from Robin Williams."

The film did not go without criticism. In a scathing review, Ed Gonzalez of Slant Magazine described the film as racist, ridiculous, and a "narcissistic circus act" from Robin Williams.

=== Accolades ===
List of awards and nominations
Award	Category	Nominee(s)	Result	Ref.
Academy Awards	Best Original Score	Alan Menken	Won	
Academy Awards	Best Original Song	"A Whole New World"; Music by Alan Menken; Lyrics by Tim Rice	Won	
Academy Awards	Best Original Song	"Friend Like Me"; Music by Alan Menken; Lyrics by Howard Ashman	Nominated	
Academy Awards	Best Sound	Terry Porter, Mel Metcalfe, David J. Hudson, and Doc Kane	Nominated	
Academy Awards	Best Sound Effects Editing	Mark Mangini	Nominated	
Annie Awards	Best Animated Feature		Won	
ASCAP Film and Television Music Awards	Top Box Office Films	Howard Ashman, Alan Menken, and Tim Rice	Won	
ASCAP Film and Television Music Awards	Most Performed Songs from Motion Pictures	"A Whole New World"; Music by Alan Menken; Lyrics by Tim Rice	Won	
BMI Film & TV Awards	Film Music Award	Alan Menken	Won	
BMI Film & TV Awards	Most Performed Song from a Film	"A Whole New World"; Music by Alan Menken; Lyrics by Tim Rice	Won	
British Academy Film Awards	Best Score	Alan Menken	Nominated	
British Academy Film Awards	Best Special Visual Effects	Don Paul and Steve Goldberg	Nominated	
Dallas–Fort Worth Film Critics Association Awards	Best Film		Nominated	
Dallas–Fort Worth Film Critics Association Awards	Best Animated Film		Won	
Golden Globe Awards	Best Motion Picture – Musical or Comedy		Nominated	
Golden Globe Awards	Best Original Score	Alan Menken	Won	
Golden Globe Awards	Best Original Song	"A Whole New World"; Music by Alan Menken; Lyrics by Tim Rice	Won	
Golden Globe Awards	Best Original Song	"Friend Like Me"; Music by Alan Menken; Lyrics by Howard Ashman	Nominated	
Golden Globe Awards	Best Original Song	"Prince Ali"; Music by Alan Menken; Lyrics by Howard Ashman	Nominated	
Golden Globe Awards	Special Achievement Award	Robin Williams	Won	
Golden Reel Awards	Best Sound Editing – Animated Feature	Doc Kane, Vince Caro, and Mark Mangini	Won	
Golden Screen Awards			Won	
Grammy Awards	Record of the Year	"A Whole New World" – Peabo Bryson, Regina Belle, and Walter Afanasieff	Nominated	
Grammy Awards	Song of the Year	"A Whole New World" – Alan Menken and Tim Rice	Won	
Grammy Awards	Best Pop Performance by a Duo or Group with Vocals	"A Whole New World" – Peabo Bryson and Regina Belle	Won	
Grammy Awards	Best Musical Album for Children	Aladdin: Original Motion Picture Soundtrack – Various Artists	Won	
Grammy Awards	Best Spoken Word Album for Children	Aladdin Sound & Story Theatre – Various Artists	Nominated	
Grammy Awards	Best Instrumental Composition Written for a Motion Picture or for Television	Aladdin: Original Motion Picture Soundtrack – Alan Menken	Won	
Grammy Awards	Best Song Written Specifically for a Motion Picture or for Television	"A Whole New World" – Alan Menken and Tim Rice	Won	
Grammy Awards	Best Song Written Specifically for a Motion Picture or for Television	"Friend Like Me" – Alan Menken and Howard Ashman	Nominated	
Hugo Awards	Best Dramatic Presentation	Ron Clements, John Musker, Ted Elliott, Terry Rossio, Burny Mattinson, Roger Allers, Daan Jippes, Kevin Harkey, Sue Nichols, Francis Glebas, Darrell Rooney, Larry Leker, James Fujii, Kirk Hanson, Kevin Lima, Rebecca Rees, David S. Smith, Chris Sanders, Brian Pimental, and Patrick A. Ventura	Nominated	
ICG Publicists Awards	Maxwell Weinberg Publicist Showmanship Award		Won	
Los Angeles Film Critics Association Awards	Best Animation	John Musker and Ron Clements	Won	
MTV Movie Awards	Best Movie		Nominated	
MTV Movie Awards	Best Comedic Performance	Robin Williams	Won	
MTV Movie Awards	Best Song From a Movie	Peabo Bryson and Regina Belle – "A Whole New World"	Nominated	
Online Film & Television Association Awards	Film Hall of Fame: Productions		Inducted	
Satellite Awards	Outstanding Youth DVD		Nominated	
Saturn Awards (1992)	Best Fantasy Film		Won	
Saturn Awards (1992)	Best Supporting Actor	Robin Williams	Won	
Saturn Awards (1992)	Best Performance by a Younger Actor	Scott Weinger	Won	
Saturn Awards (1992)	Best Music	Alan Menken	Nominated	
Saturn Awards (2004)	Best Classic Film DVD Release		Nominated	
Southeastern Film Critics Association Awards	Best Picture		3rd place	
Young Artist Awards	Outstanding Family Entertainment of the Year		Won (Note: Tied with Beauty and the Beast.)	

=== Controversies ===
One of the verses of the opening song "Arabian Nights", in which the speaker uses the lyric "where they cut off your ear if they don't like your face" to describe his homeland, was altered to "where it's flat and immense and the heat is intense" following complaints from the American-Arab Anti-Discrimination Committee (ADC). The revision first appeared on the 1993 video release. The original lyric was intact on the initial CD soundtrack release, but the rereleases use the edited lyric. The Broadway adaptation also uses the edited line. The subsequent line, however, "It's barbaric, but hey, it's home", was left intact.

The film has also been subject to criticism for its use of Orientalist stereotypes that depict Arab societies as exotic and foreign. The ADC has pointed out that the characters in the movie that the viewer is supposed to identify and sympathize with are generally presented with more white features, while the villains are presented with more Arab features. Other people have pointed out that the movie is quite inaccurate in its depictions of Arab societies. The main palace is inspired by Mughal architecture, but many of the clothes are Turkish in origin, and the outside environment is closer to that of the Arabian Desert.

Entertainment Weekly ranked Aladdin in a list of the most controversial films in history due to this incident. The number has been described in reviews as "simultaneously glamorizing and barbarizing the Arab world". The ADC also complained about the portrayal of the lead characters, Aladdin and Jasmine. They accused the filmmakers of anglicizeing their features and giving them Anglo-American accents, in contrast to the other characters, which have "foreign accents, grotesque facial features, and appear villainous or greedy". In October 2020, in response to the criticism and in acknowledgment of racial stereotypes in the wake of the George Floyd protests, Disney added a disclaimer to many of their features, including Aladdin, on Disney+, acknowledging the content as racist. These disclaimers were removed in 2025.

Another scene in which Aladdin is threatened by the tiger Rajah on the palace balcony was controversial as well. In the scene, some viewers reported hearing Aladdin quietly utter the phrase, "Good teenagers, take off your clothes", which they considered a subliminal reference to promiscuity. However, according to the commentary track on the 2004 DVD, while Musker and Clements did admit that Scott Weinger ad-libbed during the scene, they claimed that "we did not record that, we would not record that", and said that the line was, "Good tiger, take off, scat, go…", and that the word, "tiger", is overlapped by Rajah's snarl. After the word "tiger", a second voice can be heard that can be assumed to have been accidentally grafted into the soundtrack. The volume of the second voice was reduced in the 2004 Platinum Edition DVD, and removed entirely in the 2015 Diamond Edition and 2019 Signature Collection releases.

Animation enthusiasts have noticed similarities between Aladdin and Richard Williams's unfinished film, The Thief and the Cobbler (also known as The Princess and the Cobbler under Allied Filmmakers and Arabian Knight under Miramax Films). These similarities include a similar plot, similar characters, scenes, and background designs, and the antagonist Zig-Zag's resemblance to character design and mannerisms to the Genie and Jafar. Although Aladdin was released first, The Thief and the Cobbler initially began production in the 1960s, and was mired in difficulties, including financial problems, copyright issues, story revisions and late production times caused by separate studios trying to finish the film after Richard Williams was fired from the project for lack of finished work. The late release, coupled with Miramax purchasing and re-editing the film, has sometimes resulted in The Thief and the Cobbler being labeled a rip-off of Aladdin.

== Legacy ==
Alongside its role in the Disney Renaissance, Aladdin is often credited as the catalyst in the rise of casting film stars as voice actors in Hollywood-animated films with the success of Robin Williams's Genie performance. (Note: Attributed to multiple references:) Entertainment writer Scott Meslow wrote that, compared with the character of Aladdin, "Williams's Genie is the character audiences responded to, and — more importantly to Disney — its most marketable character by far", which he concluded led to the "celebrification" of later animated films, such as Shark Tale and Puss in Boots.

=== Sequels and spin-offs ===
Before the theatrical release of Aladdin, Disney commissioned Tad Stones and Alan Zaslove to produce an animated series of Aladdin, following the recently developed one of The Little Mermaid. Stones liked the character of Iago and wanted him in the cast, so he came up with an idea for a followup story that would free him from Jafar to join Aladdin. Stones suggested turning it into a wholesale direct-to-video sequel, as opposed to an hourlong television special, and The Return of Jafar was released on May 20, 1994. The film saw the debut of a new character, Abis Mal, voiced by Jason Alexander, and all of the original cast returned, except for Robin Williams, replaced by Dan Castellaneta, and Douglas Seale, replaced by Val Bettin.

The plot focuses mainly on Jafar seeking revenge on Aladdin. However, this time, with Iago on Aladdin's side, Abis Mal becomes Jafar's new henchman. Aside from a preview on The Disney Channel in early 1994, the Aladdin TV series followed in September on the syndicated The Disney Afternoon block. The episodes focused on Aladdin's adventures after the events of the second film. In 1996, the final sequel to Aladdin, Aladdin and the King of Thieves was released on video. The story concludes as Aladdin and Jasmine are about to be married and Aladdin discovers that his father is still alive, but is the king of all thieves in Agrabah.

The Aladdin characters made a crossover with Hercules: The Animated Series, and were featured as guests in the television series, House of Mouse, and related works to those series — Jafar was the leader of the villains in Mickey's House of Villains.

The film also inspired a Disney On Ice presentation, and two attractions in Disney's theme parks: "The Magic Carpets of Aladdin", a Dumbo the Flying Elephant-like ride at both Magic Kingdom at Walt Disney World Resort, Walt Disney Studios Park at Disneyland Resort Paris and Tokyo DisneySea; and the show Disney's Aladdin: A Musical Spectacular at Disney's California Adventure Park and The Magic Lamp Theater at Tokyo DisneySea.

=== Video games ===
With the film's release, three different video games based on Aladdin were released, one by Virgin Interactive for the Mega Drive, Game Boy (ported to the Game Boy Color), Nintendo Entertainment System, Amiga and IBM PC compatibles; another by SIMS for the Game Gear and Master System; and a third by Capcom for the Super NES (ported to the Game Boy Advance in 2002).

The television series inspired another game by Argonaut Games, entitled Aladdin: Nasira's Revenge and released in 2000 for the PlayStation and PC. Also, in 2004 Vivendi Universal released Disney's Aladdin Chess Adventures, a chess computer game with the Aladdin license.

The Kingdom Hearts series features a playable Aladdin world known as Agrabah. In Kingdom Hearts and Kingdom Hearts: Chain of Memories, the plotline is loosely related to the storyline of the original film. In Kingdom Hearts II, it is a mixture of Aladdin and The Return of Jafar. The Genie is also a recurring summon in the series.

=== Live-action adaptation ===
On July 15, 2015, the studio announced the development of a live-action comedy adventure prequel called Genies. The film was being written by Mark Swift and Damian Shannon, while Tripp Vinson was on board to produce via his Vinson Films banner. It was intended to serve as a lead to the live-action Aladdin film. On November 8, Disney revealed that it had originally planned to use Robin Williams's unused lines from the 1991–92 recording sessions for the film, but that his will prohibited the studio from using his likeness for 25 years after his death in 2014.

In October 2016, it was reported that Disney was developing a live-action adaptation of Aladdin, with Guy Ritchie signed to direct the film. John August wrote the script, which retains the musical elements of the original film, while Dan Lin was attached as producer. Lin revealed that they were looking for a diverse cast. In April 2017, Will Smith entered talks to play the Genie. Alan Menken said that filming was slated to begin in August 2017.

Production had originally been scheduled to begin in July, but was delayed due to Disney having trouble finding the right people to play Aladdin and Jasmine. British actress Naomi Scott and Indian actress Tara Sutaria were being considered to play Jasmine. For the role of Aladdin, British actors Riz Ahmed and Dev Patel were initially considered, but it was decided that a newcomer should be cast in the role. In July 2017, it was announced that Egyptian-Canadian actor Mena Massoud had been cast as Aladdin, Scott as Jasmine, and Smith as the Genie. At the 2017 D23 Expo, Menken announced that he would be cowriting new songs for the film with Academy Award winners Pasek and Paul, while Vanessa Taylor would rewrite the script.

In August 2017, Marwan Kenzari, Nasim Pedrad and Numan Acar joined the cast as Jafar, Dalia and Hakim, respectively. The following month, Billy Magnussen and Navid Negahban were cast as Prince Anders and the Sultan, respectively. Filming began September 6, 2017, at Longcross Studios and concluded January 24, 2018. The film was released May 24, 2019.

== See also ==
- List of Disney animated films based on fairy tales
- Lists of animated films
