= Jafar (Aladdin) =

Disney character

- Aladdin character
- First appearance: Aladdin (1992)
- Created by: Ron Clements; John Musker
- Based on: The sorcerer and the vizier in "Aladdin and the Wonderful Lamp"; Jafar in the Arabian Nights; Jafar in The Thief of Bagdad (1940); Abbasid vizier Ja'far ibn Yahya
- Designed by: Andreas Deja
- Voiced by: Jonathan Freeman
- Portrayed by: Jonathan Freeman (2011 Broadway musical adaptation); Maz Jobrani (Descendants); Marwan Kenzari (2019 film)

In-universe information
- Race: Human (originally); Mystic Human (second wish); Genie (third wish)
- Occupation: Grand vizier; Alchemist; Sorcerer
- Family: Nasira (fraternal twin sister)

Jafar is a fictional character in and the main antagonist of Walt Disney Pictures' animated film Aladdin (1992). He is voiced by Jonathan Freeman, who reprised the role in the Broadway musical adaptation. Jafar also appears again as the titular main antagonist in the sequel The Return of Jafar (1994).

An inspiration to the character is the villain Jaffar, played by Conrad Veidt in The Thief of Bagdad, from which Aladdin borrows several character ideas and plot elements. The Jafar of Disney's Aladdin plays essentially the same part as the character from the 1940 film, and is drawn with notable similarity to Veidt's looks. He is also loosely based on the real-life Abbasid vizier Ja'far ibn Yahya.

== Development ==
Animator Andreas Deja decided to design Jafar in a way he was contrasting to the other characters, with many vertical lines against the curvy designs based on Al Hirschfeld.

Jonathan Freeman, who composers Alan Menken and Howard Ashman met when he auditioned for Little Shop of Horrors and had previously invited Freeman to audition for both The Little Mermaid and Beauty and the Beast, said that the artwork was what got him interested in the role. He stated that "once I saw those heavy lidded eyes, that long narrow face, I knew that Jafar was going to be something really special." He was the first actor cast, and spent 21 months recording dialogue; he went months without any other actors to interact, and later interrupted theater tours to fly to Los Angeles and record newly written lines. When Deja first met Freeman, he was surprised to see the lack of physical similarity to the character, but included some of Freeman's acting and gesturing into Jafar's animation.

== Appearances ==
=== Films ===
==== Aladdin ====
In the 1992 adaptation of Aladdin, where he is voiced by Jonathan Freeman, Jafar is the grand vizier of Agrabah, the Sultan's most trusted advisor. He is also an evil and sinister sorcerer who strongly dislikes being second best. Jafar secretly plots to obtain the Genie's magical oil lamp and rule Agrabah. Early in the film, Aladdin is imprisoned in the palace dungeons, as arranged by Jafar due to his influence over the guards. When Princess Jasmine angrily confronts him over the incident, Jafar lies to her, pretending to have believed that Aladdin abducted her and saying that he was already executed. That night Jafar (disguised as a fellow prisoner) approaches Aladdin, striking a deal with him. In exchange for Aladdin's help in retrieving the lamp from the Cave of Wonders, Jafar reveals an escape route from the prison and promises him a reward if he succeeds, it is soon revealed that the reward is death. When the plan fails, Aladdin and the lamp are lost. The Sultan later scolds Jafar for supposedly executing an innocent life behind his back without consulting him, in which Jafar pretends to regret his actions and promises not to do it again. When his pet parrot Iago suggests an alternative plan, Jafar decides to use the hypnotic powers of his cobra-headed staff to manipulate the Sultan into mandating a marriage between himself and Jasmine. This plan also instigates Jafar's limerence towards Jasmine and thus he genuinely wants to have her as his bride. However, he is impeded by Aladdin, who had discovered the Genie and used his first wish to become a Prince. Seeing “Prince Ali” as a potential threat to his plans and a rival for Jasmine's hand in marriage, he plots to dispose of him. After a second attempt by Jafar on his life, Aladdin (with the help of the Genie and his second wish) survives and then exposes Jafar's plot against the Sultan; however, Jafar learns that Aladdin possesses the lamp before making his escape.

Iago steals the lamp from Aladdin and Jafar becomes the Genie's new master. Jafar uses his first two wishes to become Sultan and the world's most powerful sorcerer. Jafar assumes control of the palace and banishes Aladdin to a frozen wasteland. Jafar then turns the Sultan into a puppet, allowing Iago to torture the Sultan by force-feeding him crackers as revenge for the crackers the Sultan fed Iago. Jasmine begs Jafar to stop and Jafar does so. Jafar, seeking a queen to rule Agrabah alongside him, offers Jasmine his hand in marriage. Jasmine refuses and throws wine in his face. An angered Jafar decides to use his final wish to wish for Jasmine to fall in love with him. Genie tries to inform Jafar that he cannot use his magic to make people fall in love, but Jafar, grabbing him by the beard, demands him to do it anyway. Their argument causes him to not notice that Aladdin has returned and Jasmine decides to help Aladdin steal back the lamp by pretending that she is now in love with Jafar. Jafar, believing that Genie has granted him his wish, goes up to Jasmine to seduce her without realizing she is tricking him. He notices Aladdin, however, from the reflection of Jasmine's crown, and he realizes the whole thing was a ruse.

Aladdin battles Jafar (who has turned into a giant hostile cobra) and taunts him with the fact that he is only the second-most powerful being on Earth after Genie, who was the one who gave him his power in the first place and can easily take it away. Realizing that what Aladdin says is true and that he is still "second best", Jafar, consumed by his hunger for power, uses his final wish to become an all-powerful genie, in an attempt to rule the universe. However, as Jafar revels in his newfound phenomenal cosmic power, he finds out too late that Aladdin has tricked him into wasting his wish on becoming a genie, which also comes with a catch since genies are not free beings, and becomes trapped in a magic lamp of his own, which is sent into the Cave of Wonders by the Genie.

==== The Return of Jafar ====
In The Return of Jafar, Jafar's lamp is found by Abis Mal, who summons Jafar from the lamp. Jafar plots to get revenge on Aladdin. He nearly succeeds at killing Aladdin and taking control of the palace, but Iago, who has changed sides, destroys Jafar's lamp with lava, killing him.

==== Descendants ====
Jafar appears in Descendants, portrayed by Maz Jobrani. He is the father of Jay, who steals items for his father's store.

==== Aladdin (2019 film) ====
Jafar appears in Aladdin (2019), portrayed by Marwan Kenzari. Emphasis is placed on his past as a thief in his youth and his ambition to use Agrabah to invade the kingdom of Shirabad out of revenge for his time in its dungeons. The Sultan's wife and Jasmine's late mother, the Queen, was stated to have been a Princess of Shirabad prior to her marriage to the Sultan, and it is possible that Jafar arranged her murder as both revenge for his imprisonment and possibly to instigate war between the two kingdoms. The film also presents Jafar as a foil to Aladdin, the former explicitly comparing their thief backgrounds and desire to improve their social status. While Aladdin wants just enough to live comfortably, Jafar is shown to never be satisfied with what he has gained as long as there are those greater than himself. Aladdin tricks Jafar into using his last wish to become a genie, resulting in his imprisonment and being thrown into the Cave of Wonders by the Genie.

=== Television series ===
==== Hercules ====
In the Hercules crossover episode "Hercules and the Arabian Night", Jafar is resurrected by Hades. He has lost his status as an all-powerful immortal genie after dying, but Hades gives him a new cobra staff that makes him flesh and blood as long as he holds it, and the two villains team up to get rid of Aladdin and Hercules. However, due to Aladdin's wit and Hercules's strength, Jafar is defeated and pulled into the River Styx.

==== House of Mouse ====
Jafar is featured in many episodes of House of Mouse where he is often found in the audience. In one episode "Donald's Lamp Trade", Jafar hypnotizes Donald Duck to steal a lamp for him, but it turns out that he only wanted a clock-like lamp and not the real magical one. He has another major role in the episode "House of Magic", where after a badly botched magic act by Daisy Duck, in which she makes the club disappear, Mickey Mouse asks Jafar for help in bringing the club back, whereupon he and Iago perform a version of "Bibbidi-Bobbidi-Boo" to cast the spell. He also appears in the series' two direct-to-video films, appearing briefly in Mickey's Magical Christmas: Snowed in at the House of Mouse, and as the main antagonist in Mickey's House of Villains as the leader of the Disney Villains. In an episode inspired by this last film, "Pete's House of Villains", Jafar replaces Donald as the club's greeter, where he keeps the other Aladdin characters from coming into House of Mouse.

==== Once Upon a Time ====
Jafar appears in the Once Upon a Time spin-off Once Upon a Time in Wonderland, portrayed by Naveen Andrews. This version is the illegitimate son of the Sultan, and his interest in genies stems from his mentor and lover, Amara, who discovered a ritual that could be used to rewrite the laws of magic using the power of three genies and two sorcerers. Jafar betrays Amara by transforming her into his serpent staff so that he could have her power for himself.

Andrews did not reprise his role in Once Upon a Time's sixth season due to a scheduling conflict and was replaced by Oded Fehr.

=== Video games ===
==== Kingdom Hearts ====
Jafar appears in the Kingdom Hearts series, with Jonathan Freeman reprising the role in English, while Akira Takarada voices him in Japanese.

In Kingdom Hearts (2002), Jafar is an ally of Maleficent. He plans to use the Heartless to take over Agrabah while he attempts to locate both Jasmine (as she is one of the Princesses of Heart) and Agrabah's Keyhole, which leads to the heart of the world. Jafar manages to steal Genie's lamp from Aladdin and kidnap Jasmine. Sora, Aladdin, Donald Duck and Goofy track him to the Cave of Wonders, where Jafar used his first wish to reveal the Keyhole. After arriving in the lamp chamber, they engage Jafar in battle after he used his second wish to enlist Genie's help in the fight. Upon his defeat, Jafar uses his final wish to become a Genie and battles the team again, only to be defeated and sealed away in the lamp.

Facsimiles of Jafar appear in Kingdom Hearts: Chain of Memories (2004), based on Sora's memories.

In Kingdom Hearts II (2005), Jafar's lamp is found by the Peddler, making him a target for Pete as he reveals his intent to make Jafar into a Heartless under his control. Once Pete is driven off, the lamp is placed within the palace for safekeeping. However, Jafar is released by the Peddler and captures Jasmine. Sora defeats Jafar, causing him to implode, with his lamp dissolving soon after.

A virtual version of Jafar based on data from Jiminy Cricket's journal appears in Kingdom Hearts Coded (2008).

==== Other games ====
- Jafar appears as a playable character in Disney Heroes: Battle Mode.
- Jafar appears as a non-playable character in the Disney Dreamlight Valley DLC "A Rift in Time".
- Jafar appears as a playable character in Disney Speedstorm.
- In the mobile game Twisted Wonderland, Jafar is honored as "The Sorcerer of the Sands," one of "The Great Seven," due to his foresight and planning. At the magic school Night Raven College, one of the dorms, Scarabia, is dedicated to him, and students sorted into this dorm are expected to reflect his spirit of "resourcefulness". The character Jamil Viper, vice housewarden of Scarabia, is the Twisted Wonderland incarnation of Jafar. Like Jafar's cobra staff, Jamil's signature spell, "Snake Whisper" hypnotizes anyone who makes direct eye contact with Jamil. Similarly, Jamil works for a powerful family and seeks to gain power to escape his circumstances, attempting to overthrow his master. Jafar makes an appearance in flashback when the game's protagonist dreams of the events of the first film in Book 4.

=== Disney Parks and live shows ===
- In the Disney's Hollywood Studios version of Fantasmic! Nighttime Show Spectacular, Jafar is one of the villains the Evil Queen evokes to fight Mickey Mouse and ruin his imagination.
- Jafar appears with Maleficent, Ursula, and Oogie Boogie in Walt Disney World's Magic Kingdom Halloween-themed fireworks program HalloWishes at Mickey's Not-So-Scary Halloween Party.
- In the StarKid Productions musical Twisted, a parody of Aladdin inspired by the musical Wicked, Jafar is a main character and the storyline tells the Aladdin story from his point of view.
