= Brad Kane =

American actor, singer and writer (born 1973)

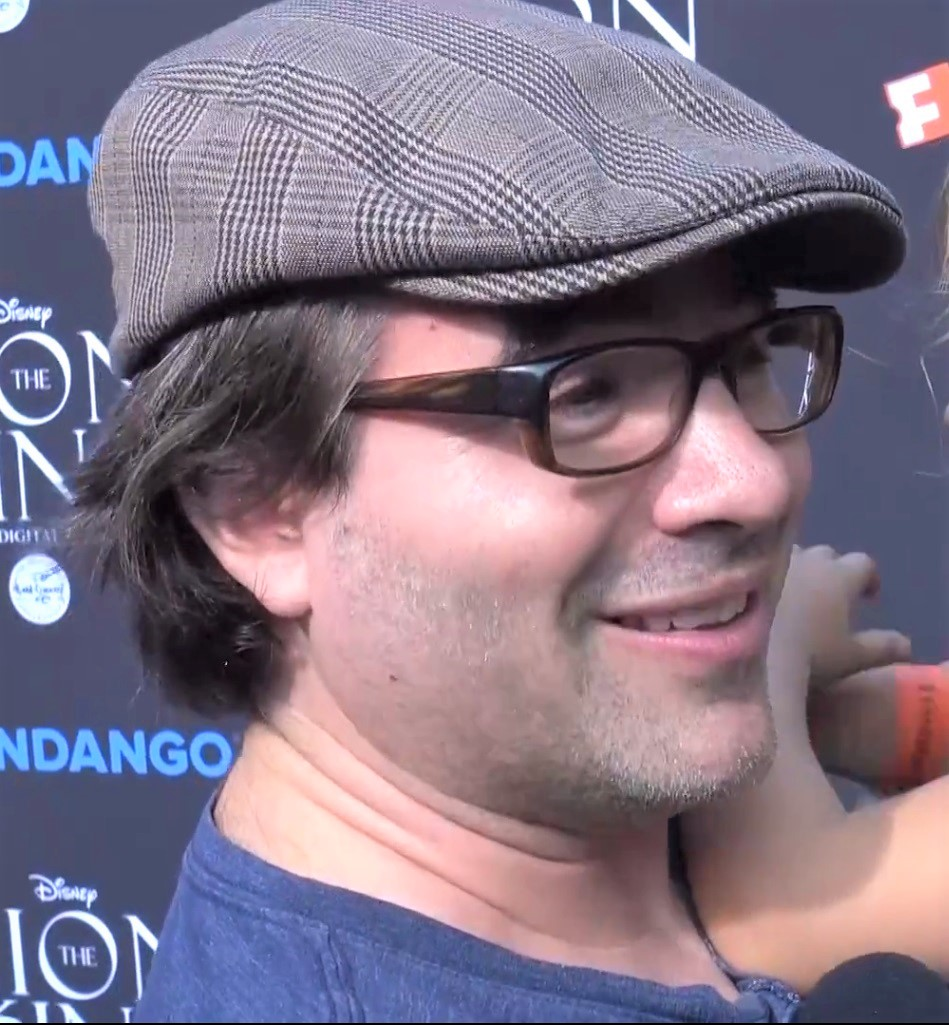
- Kane in 2017

Background information
- Born: Bradley Caleb Kane; September 29, 1973 (age 53); New Rochelle, New York, U.S.
- Genres: Pop; musical theatre
- Occupations: Actor; singer; producer; writer
- Instruments: Vocals
- Years active: 1982–present
- Labels: Federal; Reprise; Walt Disney
- Spouse: Sarah Thompson (m. 2007)
- Children: 2

Bradley Caleb Kane (born September 29, 1973) is an American actor, singer, producer, and screenwriter. He has performed the singing voice of Aladdin in the Disney franchise since its first film (1992).

== Career ==
Kane began to act with a small role in the film Six Weeks. At the age of eight, he obtained the role of one of the four chorus boys in the Broadway musical Evita. He was in that production for four months before changing to the pre-Broadway workshop of Stephen Sondheim's Sunday in the Park with George, in which he acted alongside such stars as Bernadette Peters and Mandy Patinkin. When he was eleven, Kane participated in the "Very Special Arts" festival, a series of benefit concerts for disabled children's charities, which gave him an opportunity to sing for then First Lady Nancy Reagan in the White House and at the Kennedy Center.

Kane has appeared in many commercials and programs such as Law & Order, One Life to Live, Guiding Light, Search for Tomorrow, and Plaza Sésamo. He has also been a host on the Nickelodeon series Rated K Update and has been the assistant conductor of an interview program called Girl Talk. In theatre, his credits include the role of the young Lucius in the Public Theater's production of Titus Andronicus, and two roles in James Lapine's Lincoln Center production of The Winter's Tale. He provided the singing voice of the character Aladdin, opposite Lea Salonga (Jasmine), in the 1992 film of the same name, as well as its sequels. In 1993, Kane and Salonga performed "A Whole New World" at the 65th Academy Awards.

In 1993, he played Arpad Laszlo in the Broadway revival of She Loves Me. He also played Tucker Wells in the season three episode "The Prom" of Buffy the Vampire Slayer, and provided Jonathan Levinson's singing voice in the episode "Superstar". On September 11, 2005, Kane was invited to a ceremony at Hong Kong Disneyland, the night before the theme park's opening. He performed the song "A Whole New World" from Aladdin with Cantopop star Joey Yung. As Caleb Kane, he released the song "This Close", which was played on the movie Devil's Pond. Then in 2004, he released his website with a message board to promote his album This Day in History with the first single "Go Mad" released in March 2006. Caleb has two versions of the video of this single and also another promotional video for "In Your Own Way", a song that was played on the show The Black Donnellys.

His first album, This Day in History, was released on July 1, 2008. In Fall 2008, he joined the FOX science-fiction series Fringe as a writer and co-producer. After the completion of the second season, he left the show. He co-wrote the episodes: "The Cure" (co-written by co-executive producer Felicia D. Henderson), "The No-Brainer" (co-written by co-executive producer David H. Goodman), and "Inner Child" (co-written with Julia Cho). On June 7, 2011, it was announced that he was involved with the aborted reboot of Daredevil. Since 2014 Kane is a producer on Black Sails.

In 2018, Kane released a collection of ten songs on his SoundCloud site called NEGATIVE PICKUP. The project was abandoned by Kane, only releasing three songs. He has since retired from recording music professionally.

== Personal life ==
Kane has been married to actress Sarah Thompson since July 28, 2007; together they have two children: one son, one daughter.

== Filmography ==
=== Acting credits ===
==== Film ====
Year	Title	Role	Notes
1982	Six Weeks	Nutcracker Dancer	Uncredited
1984	The Flamingo Kid	Mitch	
1992	Aladdin	Aladdin (singing voice)	
1994	The Return of Jafar	Aladdin (singing voice)	Direct-to-video
1996	Aladdin and the King of Thieves	Aladdin (singing voice)	Direct-to-video
1996	Christmas in Cartoontown	Jack, Pinocchio, Singing Elf (voice)	Direct-to-video
1997	Starship Troopers	Lanny	
2002	The Adventures of Tom Thumb and Thumbelina	Tom Thumb (singing voice)	Direct-to-video

==== Television ====
Year	Title	Role	Notes
1985	ABC Funfit	Funfit Kid	
1988–1990	Rated K Update	Host	
1991	Law & Order	Buzz Collins	Episode: "Out of Control"
1998	Tales from the Wild: Cain the Coyote	Narrator	
1999–2000	Buffy the Vampire Slayer	Jonathan Levinson (singing voice), Tucker Wells	2 episodes
2017	Penn Zero: Part-Time Hero	Grinkon (voice)	Episode: "That Purple Guy"

==== Video games ====
Year	Title	Role	Notes
1994	Aladdin: Activity Center	Aladdin (singing voice)	Archive footage
2001	Disney's Aladdin in Nasira's Revenge	Aladdin (singing voice)	
TBA	Disney Dreamlight Valley	Aladdin (singing voice)	

==== Theme parks ====
Year	Title	Role	Notes
2003	Mickey's PhilharMagic	Aladdin (voice)	Archive recordings

=== Writing and producing credits ===
Key
†	Denotes works that have not yet been released

==== Film ====
- Extinction (2018) (screenplay)
- The Banker (2020) (story)

==== Television ====
Year	Title	Creator	Writer	Executive producer	Notes
2008–2009	Crash	No	No	Consulting	
2008–2010	Fringe	No	Yes	Co-producer	
2014–2017	Black Sails	No	Yes	Yes	
2018	Lodge 49	No	Yes	Co-executive	
2019–2023	Warrior	No	Yes	Yes	
2022	Moonhaven	No	Yes	Consulting	
2022–2024	Tokyo Vice	No	Yes	Yes	
2025–present	It: Welcome to Derry	No	Yes	Yes	
2026	Crystal Lake	Developer	Yes	Yes	

== Discography ==
=== Albums ===
- Classic by The Misconceptions (Brad's College band) (1993)
- This Day in History (July 1, 2008)
- Negative Pickup (2018)

=== Digital albums ===
- "Go Mad"
- "In Your Own Way"
- Selections

=== Other albums ===
- The Artist Lounge Album
- Ahead of the Curve (EP)
