= Friend Like Me =

Song by Robin Williams

from the album Aladdin: Original Motion Picture Soundtrack
- Released: October 31, 1992
- Recorded: 1991
- Genre: Show tune; swing; jazz
- Length: 2:26
- Label: Walt Disney
- Composer: Alan Menken
- Lyricist: Howard Ashman
- Producer: Alan Menken

Licensed audio
- "Friend Like Me (Remastered 2022)" on YouTube

"Friend Like Me" is a song from Disney's 1992 animated feature film Aladdin, performed by Robin Williams in his role as the Genie. The song is also performed by Will Smith in the 2019 live-action remake. It was nominated for the Academy Award for Best Original Song at the 65th Academy Awards and the Golden Globe Award for Best Original Song at the 50th Golden Globe Awards in 1993.

== Production ==
The song was originally designed as a Cab Calloway-style big band number. Some elements of this concept remain (for instance, when the Genie scats, in typical Calloway moves), but after Robin Williams was cast it was expanded as a more comedic, pop-culture-filled song.

ScreenCrush stated that remnants of the previous version of the film can be seen in this sequence:

Aladdin's original design was younger, more cartoony, and loosely based on actor Michael J. Fox. But Jeffrey Katzenberg wanted the design changed, fearing that Aladdin wasn't a suitable leading man for the beautiful Jasmine. So Aladdin's design was reworked to be less Michael J. Fox and more Tom Cruise. However, animation on the movie had already started, so you can see traces of the old Aladdin design during "Friend Like Me".

== Synopsis ==
After being released from his lamp by Aladdin, the Genie announces that he can grant three wishes to give the thief nearly anything he desires. When Aladdin expresses skepticism over the extent of the Genie's powers, the Genie stages an elaborate musical number and stresses that he can be a friend unlike any others Aladdin has ever had. This song is similar to the use of contemporary references in "Be Our Guest", performed by the enchanted cutlery of Beauty and the Beast, and "A Guy Like You", performed by the Gargoyles in The Hunchback of Notre Dame. The same happens in the live-action remake.

== Critical reception ==
Spirituality & Practice described it as "the big production number of the film".

In a review of the Broadway version of the film, BuzzFeed wrote that the "seven-and-a-half minute 'Friend Like Me' is easily this season's best production number, and a jaw-dropping athletic feat." NewYork.com wrote "Rarely does a production number receive a standing ovation in the middle of a show, but 'Friend Like Me' [has] them standing in the aisles before intermission.".

== In popular culture ==
In 1996 2Pac recorded the song "Never Had a Friend Like Me", which interpolates "Friend Like Me". This song is featured on the 1997 original soundtrack for the film, Gridlock'd.

Will Smith, as the Genie, performs the song in the 2019 live-action remake of Aladdin, and as a rap in the end credits, with DJ Khaled.

== Charts ==
Weekly chart performance for Ne-Yo version
Chart (2015)	Peak position
Japan Hot 100 (Billboard)	92

Weekly chart performance for Will Smith version
Chart (2019)	Peak position
New Zealand Hot Singles (RMNZ)	33
Scottish Singles Sales (Official Charts)	49
South Korea (Gaon)	96
UK Singles (Official Charts)	95

== Certifications ==
Will Smith version

Region	Certification	Certified units/sales
New Zealand (RMNZ)	Gold	15,000^{‡}
United Kingdom (BPI)	Gold	400,000^{‡}
United States (RIAA)	Platinum	1,000,000^{‡}
^{‡} Sales+streaming figures based on certification alone.
