= List of Aladdin episodes =

Aladdin is an animated television series made by Walt Disney Television Animation which aired from 1994 to 1995, based on the original 1992 feature film of the same name. Coming on the heels of the direct-to-video sequel The Return of Jafar, the series picked up where that installment left off, with Aladdin still living on the streets of Agrabah but now engaged to the beautiful and fearless Princess Jasmine. "Al" and Jasmine go together into peril among sorcerers, monsters, thieves, and more. Monkey sidekick Abu, the animated Magic Carpet, and the fast-talking, shape-shifting Genie come along to help, as does sassy, temperamental parrot Iago, formerly Jafar's minion.

Many of the films' stars provided the voices of their TV counterparts, with the notable exception of Dan Castellaneta filling in for Robin Williams in the Genie role, and Val Bettin replacing Douglas Seale as the Sultan. Much like Timon & Pumbaa, almost every episode title is a parody of a famous movie, song, phrase, or TV show.

Like The New Adventures of Winnie the Pooh, Chip 'n Dale: Rescue Rangers, TaleSpin, Darkwing Duck, and Bonkers before it, Aladdin was originally previewed on The Disney Channel in early 1994, prior to the release of The Return of Jafar, which is a sequel to the original 1992 film that also serves as a pilot to the series. From late 1994-early 1995, 65 episodes aired on The Disney Afternoon syndicated block and 13 more aired simultaneously on CBS Saturday mornings. In the fall of 1995, another 8 episodes aired on Saturday mornings on CBS. The Disney Afternoon episodes and the first 13 CBS episodes constituted a single production season, but they are divided here and are therefore not listed according to their broadcast chronology. A total of eighty-six episodes were made; counting the third movie as the eighty-seventh and official series finale.

== Series overview ==
Season	Episodes		Originally released		
Season	Episodes		First released	Last released	Network
1	78	65	September 5, 1994	February 28, 1995	Syndicated (The Disney Afternoon)
1	78	13	September 17, 1994	December 10, 1994	CBS
2	8		September 16, 1995	November 25, 1995	CBS

== Episodes ==
=== Season 1 (1994–95) ===
No. overall	No. in season	Title	Directed by	Written by	Original release date	Prod. code
Syndication
1	1	"Air Feather Friends"	Toby Shelton	Tad Stones and Brian Swenlin	September 5, 1994	1
Three small but destructive tornadoes sweep through the marketplace of Agrabah, stealing jewels and gold and leaving behind damaged booths. The more superstitious think they are wind demons, but Aladdin thinks they are merely thieves. He is forced to prove his theory and Abu's freedom is on the line if he cannot. He discovers that Abis Mal and his henchmen are using the magic golden feathers of a baby Roc to create the tornadoes. Now it is up to Aladdin and his friends to save the day. Absent: Jasmine.
2	2	"Bad Mood Rising"	Rob LaDuca	Jan Strnad	September 6, 1994	31
Aladdin, Jasmine, Abu, Iago and Genie head off on Carpet to open trade with Quirkistan, but are shocked to find Quirkistan a dreary wasteland; it turns out that the land is enchanted so that the weather and states of things are determined solely by the mood of King Mamoud, Quirkistan's spoiled child king. He is currently brooding over missing his birthday party and as a result, the whole land is doomed. So, with the prospect of a rich treasure reward, the gang tries to cheer up the king. Aladdin comes close with his risky sword-juggling act, but only Jasmine's storytelling engages Mamoud. But Jasmine will have to stay there and entertain the King forever.
3	3	"To Cure a Thief"	Rob LaDuca	Kevin Campbell and Brian Swenlin	September 7, 1994	11
The clumsy thief Amin Damoola barely escapes within an inch of decapitation from the Sultan's treasury. As Abu is found holding the gauntlet which triggered the trap mechanisms, Aladdin rages that there is one theft too many and intends to leash his too handy friend, who runs away, followed by ever-greedy Iago. Abu is recruited by Amin, who brings them to the guild of thieves, where his reputation is abysmal, then they set out to steal the gauntlet, which is a thief's ideal magical aid. Without each other, Abu feels as miserable, guilty and lonely as Aladdin, who sets out with the gang to get Abu back, but Amin already brought him to the palace, where no safety can stop the monkey. Note: This episode was previewed on The Disney Channel on April 17, 1994.
4	4	"Do the Rat Thing"	Toby Shelton	Jan Strnad	September 8, 1994	22
While being bothered by a prince from a neighboring kingdom who wishes to marry her, Jasmine is further infuriated with Aladdin when he addresses her as "princess" instead of her name, and that Aladdin will not let her accompany him on the streets because she does not know the first thing of being a street rat. To prove him wrong, she goes on the streets with Iago. But when she steals a magic mirror, it turns her into a rat and Iago into a lizard. Now the two have to sneak into the palace to find Aladdin so they can get Genie to reverse the curse. Absent: Carpet.
5	5	"Never Say Nefir"	Alan Zaslove	Kevin Campbell	September 9, 1994	8
Arriving in Getizstan, the group find it being destroyed every night by a giant, rampaging and dancing rhino, Semir the Destroyer, and rebuilt by Nefir and his imps the following day for a large price. As he investigates, Genie learns that Nefir is responsible for forcing Semir to dance with magic dancing shoes. The situation only gets worse when Nefir puts the shoes on Genie's feet as well and it is up to Aladdin to remove them. Note: This episode was previewed on The Disney Channel on April 24, 1994. Absent: Jasmine.
6	6	"Getting the Bugs Out"	Toby Shelton	Steve Roberts	September 12, 1994	15
After they fight off a mechanical bronze bug that was sent to Agrabah from a neighboring land, Genie and Carpet are dismayed when Aladdin is taking credit for their accomplishments. However, as this continues when they track the bug to its source, they meet their new opponent: the inventor Mechanicles, who captures the two of them, and it is up to Aladdin to take charge and fight off machines on his own. Note: This episode was previewed on The Disney Channel on February 6, 1994.
7	7	"The Vapor Chase"	Toby Shelton	Steve Roberts	September 13, 1994	38
Abis Mal comes across some magic powder that, when burnt, creates a smoke creature willing to steal for him. He then tricks Jasmine into buying all of the powder to give to the people of Agrabah to use as fuel. Only after stealing from the people of Agrabah, the smoke creatures combine to form the smoke monster Sootinai, who then turns against Abis Mal and starts destroying Agrabah.
8	8	"Garden of Evil"	Rob LaDuca	Mirith J. Colao	September 14, 1994	48
Twenty years ago, a much younger Sultan stumbled upon a magnificent garden and plucked a flower to take home to his bride. This aroused the anger of the garden's master, an enchanter, named Arbutus, who sees himself as an artist and creates beautiful things, but despises man for seemingly carelessly destroying his work. The only way he allows the Sultan to leave alive is the promise of the Sultan's most valuable treasure twenty years later, which turns out to be Jasmine.
9	9	"Much Abu About Something"	Alan Zaslove	Bruce Reid Schaefer	September 15, 1994	21
A lost civilization that lives high in the crater of an isolated, extinct volcano is being menaced by a surviving Tyrannosaurus and worships Abu as their great protector; but Aladdin pushes Abu out of the spotlight by continuously talking for his simian companion. Note: This episode was previewed on The Disney Channel on March 27, 1994. Absent: Jasmine.
10	10	"My Fair Aladdin"	Alan Zaslove	Steve Roberts	September 16, 1994	18
Aladdin becomes more sociable when he feels left out from the royal meetings, though Jasmine disagrees with this change that Aladdin should be himself. However, when Genie is captured while investigating Mechanicles' latest scheme, it is up to Aladdin to rescue him. Note: This episode was previewed on The Disney Channel on April 3, 1994.
11	11	"Some Enchanted Genie"	Toby Shelton	Brian Swenlin and Marlowe Weisman	September 19, 1994	35
Genie falls in love with a female genie, named Eden, but she is not a free genie, having a young, homeless orphan girl, named Dandhi as her master. Trouble ensues when Abis Mal sets his sights on obtaining Eden, making him her new master. Absent: Jasmine, Iago and Carpet.
12	12	"Web of Fear"	Bob Hathcock	Kevin Campbell and Brian Swenlin	September 20, 1994	28
A large section of Agrabah collapses into the caverns below and the residents believe the legendary Unkhbut, a giant spider-like creature to be responsible.
13	13	"Mudder's Day"	Alan Zaslove	Jan Strnad	September 21, 1994	4
While traveling through the desert, the group is lured into a false oasis. It turns out to be a trap to catch food for the underground-dwelling, carnivorous mud creatures Al Muddi. Note: This episode was previewed on The Disney Channel on February 13, 1994.
14	14	"Plunder the Sea"	Rob LaDuca and Toby Shelton	Steve Roberts	September 22, 1994	26
Aladdin and Captain Al Bahtross have to work together to solve the mystery of the kraken sinking the merchant ships. The culprit is no ordinary sea monster, but one of Mechanicles' inventions. Absent: Carpet.
15	15	"Strike Up the Sand"	Alan Zaslove	Bill Motz and Bob Roth	September 23, 1994	14
After helping fellow street rat Sadira, Aladdin finds that she has fallen in love with him and quickly rejects her. However, finding books on Sand Magic, Sadira tries to use the spells to make Aladdin fall in love with her by conjuring a sand beast to kidnap Jasmine.
16	16	"I Never Mechanism I Didn't Like"	Rob LaDuca	Bill Motz and Bob Roth	September 26, 1994	20
Mechanicles, in another attempt to defeat Aladdin, tries to hypnotize all of Aladdin's friends with a valet-style automaton named "Gregarious", given to the Sultan as an apparent gift of peace, and fails to notice that Genie and Carpet, being supernatural are not affected by his hypnotic-eyed creation.
17	17	"Fowl Weather"	Alan Zaslove	Mike Ryan	September 27, 1994	6
The group goes on a trip to a tropical rain forest in search of water. The rain forest and all the rain clouds are ruled by a bird called Thundra, who falls for Iago. While Thundra is distracted by Iago, the others steal a rain cloud to take back to Agrabah to give water to the people, though Jasmine is uncomfortable with this plan because of them using Iago to manipulate Thundra like that, only to face the wrath of Thundra once she discovers Iago's deceit. Note: This episode was previewed on The Disney Channel on February 20, 1994.
18	18	"Forget Me Lots"	Alan Zaslove	Mike Ryan	September 28, 1994	16
Abis Mal uses a magic rose called the Rose of Forgetfulness to erase Jasmine's memory and tricks her into thinking she is his daughter, destined to take over Agrabah. But his plan backfires when Jasmine locks him up too and it is up to Aladdin to remind her of who she really is.
19	19	"Scare Necessities"	Rob LaDuca	Mark Saraceni	September 29, 1994	55
Jasmine receives a cute pet that, when frightened, grants the wish of whoever is frightening it, in hopes to save itself from the danger. Only this causes it to be sought out by both the greedy Iago and Amin Damoola for its unique ability. Absent: Carpet.
20	20	"SandSwitch"	Rob LaDuca and Toby Shelton	Bill Motz and Bob Roth	September 30, 1994	27
One night, Sadira casts a spell over all of Agrabah. The next morning, everyone's memories have been rearranged so that Sadira is the princess and Jasmine is a street rat. But seeing that Jasmine's pet tiger, Rajah is ready to attack her, as well as Iago and Abu's behavior, Sadira realizes that the spell does not work on animals. Now the animals must find Jasmine, bring her home and bring things back to normal.
21	21	"Lost and Founded"	Bob Hathcock	Bill Motz and Bob Roth	October 3, 1994	44
Abis Mal steals a magic hourglass that acts as a time machine, and with Aladdin and his friends, he travels back to the year where Agrabah was founded and plans for his ancestor, Abnor Mal to become the Sultan to change history. Aladdin must prevent this before it is too late. Note: This episode reveals that Agrabah was founded by Sheikh Hamed, the ancestor of the current ruling family. Absent: Carpet.
22	22	"Moonlight Madness"	Alan Zaslove	Mirith J. Colao	October 4, 1994	19
On the night of a full moon, Aladdin is caught between his promise to spend the night alone with Jasmine, and his desire to help his friends uncover a mysterious treasure. Complicating matters is a mysterious young woman and a jackal, which the group soon realizes are actually one and the same and must save an angry Jasmine from being harmed.
23	23	"The Flawed Couple"	Rob LaDuca	Bill Motz and Bob Roth	October 5, 1994	66
Mechanicles and Abis Mal meet and find they have the same common enemy; Aladdin. Luring Aladdin and his group into a trap, they plan to use Mechanicles' robotic insects with Abis Mal's magical "mood stones", which change a person's emotions to a specific emotion to throw the group into disarray to complete their revenge.
24	24	"Rain of Terror"	Bob Hathcock and Rob LaDuca	Mike Ryan	October 6, 1994	30
While in the rain forest with Abu and Genie, Iago is given Thundra's mystical amulet that controls and manipulates the weather, and the five elements; Water, Fire, Earth, Air, and Quintessence while she takes a vacation. But Thundra's enemy, a feathered serpent, named Malcho, who tricks Iago into giving it to him and now the three have to give it back for Thundra's sake. Absent: Aladdin, Jasmine and Carpet.
25	25	"Dune Quixote"	Rob LaDuca	Jan Strnad	October 7, 1994	54
Sadira's up to her old tricks again, as she casts a spell on Aladdin, making him think he is her knight in shining armor and Abu is his loyal steed. Before she can transport them both to her fantasy kingdom, Jasmine, Genie and Iago stop them, but when Genie messes up the spell with his magic, it causes some side effects where Aladdin still thinks he is a knight and Abu is a mule. Now everyone must recreate Sadira's fantasy in real-life and Aladdin must give Sadira true love's kiss before the spell can be broken. However, as Jasmine disagrees with the plan, she and Sadira begin to talk and make peace in their rivalry towards Aladdin's affection.
26	26	"The Day the Bird Stood Still"	Alan Zaslove	Kevin Campbell	October 10, 1994	39
Abis Mal has cursed the Sultan's bath oils with the aid of a venom from a rock ifrit, which will turn him to stone by sundown. But Iago is cursed instead when he sneaks into the Sultan's bathroom and uses the oil. When all of his friends' attempts to cure him fail, he strikes a bargain with Abis Mal; Genie's lamp in exchange for the antidote.
27	27	"Of Ice and Men"	Alan Zaslove	Bill Motz and Bob Roth	October 11, 1994	3
Aladdin and the group meet an ice ifrit, named Frajhid when at the Frozen North, and bring him back to Agrabah to use his magic to bring ice and snow to excite the people of Agrabah with fun. Although initially satisfied, Aladdin and his friends realize that the cold weather is too much for the city to handle, and they must find a way to send Frajhid back to the frozen north before the situation gets too out of hand.
28	28	"Opposites Detract"	Bob Hathcock and Rob LaDuca	Dev Ross and Mike Ryan (story); Mirith J. Colao	October 12, 1994	42
Aladdin, Genie, Iago, Abu and Carpet travel to the far eastern city of Pei Ling, but not before rescuing a young youth, named Zin, who fainted in the desert. Upon arrival, they find the town destroyed. Unknown to Aladdin and the gang, Zin is forced every night by his dark-side Zang to turn into a dragon, the former city's protector, who destroys the town. Once Aladdin learns of this, it is up to him and the others to stop the dragon's destructiveness, and convince Zin to ward off his evil-half. Absent: Jasmine.
29	29	"Caught by the Tale"	Bob Hathcock and Rob LaDuca	Mirith J. Colao	October 13, 1994	67
When two kids from Agrabah want to hear stories of Aladdin, Genie and Iago tell, with Iago embellishing, a little too much. Abis Mal and Haroud, having overheard the stories, convince the kids to help them obtain an ancient helmet of scorpion armor which once belonged to an invincible warrior, saying that only Aladdin would have been brave enough. Despite being scared, the kids agree and end up trapped in a hole. A guilty Iago and Abu go after them, and Iago hurts his wing. Finding new courage, the two lead the way out and warn Genie. Meanwhile, Abis Mal has discovered that the helmet can freeze anyone and takes over the palace. After Genie fails, Aladdin shows up and defeats Mal, breaking the helmet. Upon hearing of the stories, he explains that the kids were heroes too for helping and that anyone can, if they just have the heart. Absent: Jasmine (mentioned only) and Carpet.
30	30	"Elemental, My Dear Jasmine"	Alan Zaslove	Mirith J. Colao	October 14, 1994	10
While at the beach, after being ridiculed by Aladdin when she gets wet and has seaweed over her hair, Jasmine is dragged underwater and meets the Water elemental Saleen. But after giving Jasmine the ability to breathe in her ocean, Saleen learns about Aladdin, traps Jasmine underwater and goes on land to win Aladdin's heart. The only way to reverse the curse that binds Jasmine underwater is to return Saleen to the sea, which is easier than it seems, as Saleen's enchanted water also enables Jasmine to connect with any water source.
31	31	"Smolder and Wiser"	Rob LaDuca	Bill Motz and Bob Roth	October 17, 1994	45
Haroud tricks Aladdin into believing that he has been cursed with clumsiness. Meanwhile, Abis Mal plots to take over Agrabah by forcing it to surrender or be destroyed by an ifrit, named Magma, who controls volcanoes.
32	32	"The Game"	Alan Zaslove	Richard Stanley	October 18, 1994	13
Two game-loving wizards exploit Genie's desire to beat Carpet in a game, but have more in mind than a friendly competition for Genie and the gang.
33	33	"Poor Iago"	Alan Zaslove	Steve Roberts	October 20, 1994	59
After being caught while trying to steal gold dust from the Palace treasure room, Iago is tired of always being greedy and he begins giving things away uncontrollably, which causes a situation when he gives away people's valuables, i.e. Genie's lamp and Abu's fez. Absent: Carpet.
34	34	"The Animal Kingdom"	Bob Hathcock and Rob LaDuca	Richard Stanley	October 24, 1994	57
Aladdin and friends stumble across a hidden valley where anthropomorphic animals have built their own civilization. Since Aladdin is human, he is believed to be a dangerous threat to their prosperous city. Absent: Jasmine.
35	35	"Power to the Parrot"	Rob LaDuca	Jan Strnad	October 25, 1994	40
Iago wants to prove that he can do just as good a job as Genie using magic, so Genie transfers his magic to Iago at his request. But he finds out that it is not as easy as it looks. Note: Aladdin and Jasmine have a secondary role.
36	36	"The Sands of Fate"	Bob Hathcock and Rob LaDuca	Richard Stanley	October 27, 1994	65
As Aladdin and his friends journey through one of the seven endless deserts, they witness a battle between the Riders of Ramond and some marauders, which is suddenly cut short. The wise seer, Phasir, appears to them saying that it is their fate to repeat this battle. Aladdin tries to stop them and ends up one of their own. Soon, only Genie and Iago are left, and they learn that a mystical gem which fell from a chest is the cause of this battle. Now Genie and Iago must prevent the gem from falling or their friends and the Riders of Ramond are doomed to be locked in time forever. Absent: Jasmine.
37	37	"The Citadel"	Alan Zaslove	Bill Motz and Bob Roth	October 31, 1994	70
After facing off against a magical creature threatening the city, Aladdin encounters the wizard responsible for the creature, a young sorcerer, named Mozenrath, who took control of the Land of the Black Sand after obtaining the former ruler's power and turning him into a slave. Seeing Aladdin's bravery and wit, Mozenrath offers him a job, but when Aladdin turns him down, he resorts to kidnapping Genie. Now, Aladdin and his friends must rescue Genie before he is devoured by the magic devouring creature, the Thirdack. Absent: Jasmine.
38	38	"Snowman is an Island"	Alan Zaslove	Dev Ross, Bill Motz and Bob Roth	November 2, 1994	47
While passing through a frozen wasteland, Aladdin, Genie and the others encounter an abominable snowman's castle. The yeti lets them pass, all but Genie, who must stay to entertain him. Aladdin and the others must devise a way to sneak the Genie past the snowman, and wind up teaching the snowman to entertain himself in the process. Absent: Jasmine and Carpet (Carpet mentioned only).
39	39	"The Secret of Dagger Rock"	Rob LaDuca	Mirith J. Colao	November 3, 1994	74
Aladdin is captured by Mozenrath, who demands Genie as an exchange. Jasmine, who feels responsible for not being able to help when she had witnessed Aladdin's sudden abduction, wants to help rescue him. When her father forbids her, she goes disguised as a palace guard to help rescue Aladdin. Note: Genie reveals that he still wears his golden shackles despite having been freed from his lamp because he is "a slave to fashion".
40	40	"In the Heat of the Fright"	Alan Zaslove	Mirith J. Colao	November 4, 1994	43
Aladdin and company have been assigned to chart a river through neighboring lands, but on the way, they come upon a burning village. After rescuing the people from the fire cats who attacked it, the source of the mischief reveals herself, Mirage, a cat-like entity who is described as "Evil Incarnate" by Iago. As nightfall begins, the Genie becomes increasingly afraid of Mirage, and moves the group back on the way to Agrabah, but due to sleepiness, they are instead transported to Mirage's own world, Morbia. Here, they must battle the fire cats to defeat Mirage. But as Genie discovers, he must first conquer his own fears, as that is what they feed on, before Aladdin and company can escape. Absent: Jasmine (although Mirage shapeshifts into her).
41	41	"The Seven Faces of Genie"	Rob LaDuca	Grant Moran (story); Kevin Campbell and Duane Capizzi	November 7, 1994	58
On a diplomatic mission to negotiate with Sultan Pasda Al Dente of Getizstan, the Sultan appoints Genie and Al diplomats. Genie tries to be all aspects of a diplomat at once, but things go awry when Abis Mal and Haroud throw an orb at him which splits Genie into his seven personalities; anger, courage, weirdness, wisdom, laughter, fear and kindness. Now Aladdin and the others must figure a way to get all of Genie's personalities back together before Abis Mal uses him to overtake Getzistan. Absent: Jasmine and Carpet.
42	42	"The Wind Jackals of Mozenrath"	Alan Zaslove	Bill Motz and Bob Roth	November 8, 1994	71
Aladdin, Jasmine, and Abu depart to the Land of the Black Sand on a secret mission involving a mysterious "weapon" possessed by Mozenrath. Back at the palace, Genie, Carpet and Iago gradually notice their friends' absence. Iago suggests that Al, Jas, and Abu have gone off treasure hunting and "cut them from the deal". Genie, meanwhile, assumes his friends are in danger. The three rush off to the Land of the Black Sand, only to foil Aladdin and Jasmine's mission and get everyone caught because of Mozenrath's magic detecting devices. Mozenrath imprisons the heroes, leaving them to die at dawn by the burning of a diamond mechanism in the ceiling. He then reveals that his secret weapon is in fact, a magical wind jackal that he will use to conquer Agrabah, and departs haughtily. While imprisoned, Jasmine and Aladdin reveal the reason why the others were left behind, Genie and Carpet because their magic could be detected and they would not let them and Abu face the danger alone, while Iago is a loudmouth. Abu manages to pick the lock on Genie's anti-magic cuffs, and Genie rescues everyone. They return to Agrabah to stop Mozenrath from using the wind jackal to destroy the city, using Iago's vocal-mimicking ability to trick the jackal with Mozenrath's voice.
43	43	"A Clockwork Hero"	Alan Zaslove	Kevin Campbell	November 9, 1994	73
Wahid is a young boy in Agrabah who wants to be a hero like Aladdin. He gets his chance when he comes upon one of Mechanicles' contraptions, a giant robot built in his likeness. After climbing inside and taking control, he defeats a local hero, Dominus Tusk, to prove his worth, but Mechanicles wants his robot back, and when he takes control of it again, Wahid is still inside. Aladdin and the gang must get Wahid out, or he will have to take advantage of an awkward situation to be a hero after all. Absent: Jasmine.
44	44	"Mission: Imp Possible"	Alan Zaslove	Steve Roberts	November 10, 1994	46
After finding that a treasure called golden silk is being protected by a giant worm, Nefir poisons Aladdin and tricks Genie into helping him, with the promise that a small amount of the golden silk can cure Aladdin. However, as Genie and Iago set out to find the silk, they are unaware that Nefir intends to use them to get past the worm, which has evolved into a giant moth. Note: The episode's title is an indirect reference to Mission: Impossible.
45	45	"Stinker Belle"	Alan Zaslove	Kevin Campbell and Robert Schechter	November 11, 1994	23
Aladdin, Jasmine and the others have traveled to Odiferous to witness the wedding of Prince Uncouthma to his beloved, the strong barbarian woman, Brawnhilda. Complications arise when Brawnhilda decides she wants to marry Aladdin instead, as he is frail compared to barbarians, and needs protection. Uncouthma becomes increasingly infuriated, and when Jasmine suggests he fight to keep his bride-to-be, he mistakes her meaning and chooses to fight Aladdin to the death for Brawhnhilda. But unknown to either side, the Royal Vizier, Runta, a small and puny barbarian, is plotting to take Uncouthma out of the picture and claim the throne for himself.
46	46	"Shadow of a Doubt"	Alan Zaslove	Mirith J. Colao	November 14, 1994	80
Mirage enters the palace disguised as "Sultana" and gets information on the gang; but she soon reveals herself and her plot, a large black obelisk has been placed on the outskirts of Agrabah. As its shadow extends, it will lengthen until sunset, wiping everything in its reach out of existence. But Mirage does give Aladdin one clue, a mirror in a cavern on top of the world filled with many other mirrors, one which reveals the truth beneath the surface, is the only way to save Agrabah. Aladdin, Jasmine and all but Genie retrieve it, while he tries to destroy the obelisk, and they soon return, supposedly saving the city. But Jasmine, Iago and Abu notice strange things happening, i.e. no one yelling at Abu for stealing, the Sultan calling Jasmine "Princess", and Mirage takes them to her own world after they get too close to revealing her ultimate design. Once Al realizes this, it is up to him and Genie to conjure up a mirage of their own to fool the sorceress or else lose their friends and their city.
47	47	"Smells Like Trouble"	Alan Zaslove	Bruce Reid Schaefer and Richard Stanley	November 15, 1994	41
While visiting Odiferous, Aladdin and the others meet Prince Uncouthma and Brawnhilda's son, Bud. But an epidemic is spreading, leaving the Odiferans petrified. Desperate to prove himself to Bud, Aladdin takes on barbarian challenges, but soon learns that the cause of the petrifying, a lizard brought by a trader, is attacking his friends, including Uncouthma. As the barbarians try to stop the lizard with brute force, General Gouda, too, is petrified and Al realizes that to beat the little creature, he will have to lure it with the thing it eats most cheese and change the smell of its breath, before other lizards come to Odiferous. Absent: Jasmine.
48	48	"The Way We War"	Bob Hathcock and Rob LaDuca	Bruce Reid Schaefer	November 16, 1994	34
Agrabah and Odiferous go to war, with Nefir and his Imps supplying weapons. As Aladdin and the group investigate, they discover that Nefir is behind the whole war so he can profit off of both sides.
49	49	"Night of the Living Mud"	Alan Zaslove	Bill Motz and Bob Roth	November 17, 1994	83
After battling the Al Muddy, Aladdin and the gang come home, with Al tired out. Genie decides that he and Jasmine need a night off, but Iago has accidentally brought some of the Al Muddy home. As Genie endeavors to take care of the muddy nemesis without disturbing Aladdin, the situation becomes increasingly more complicated.
50	50	"Egg-stra Protection"	Rob LaDuca	Brian Swenlin	November 18, 1994	69
Aladdin and his friends head to Getizstan to aid them against a gryphon by recovering its egg that has been stolen by Abis Mal, who plans to use the newborn gryphon to help him complete a potion to make him invincible. But after Aladdin's ribs are broken from an accident that occurred when he helped recover the egg in Agrabah, Jasmine wants him to stay on the sidelines and recover while they return the egg, but Aladdin wishes to help and Jasmine soon finds herself under attack from the gryphon.
51	51	"Heads, You Lose"	Rob LaDuca	Bill Motz and Bob Roth	November 21, 1994	75
A disembodied wizard, named Caliph Kapok pays the Sultan a visit and asks Aladdin to help rejoin him to his evil body. They do so, but soon realize that Caliph's head is evil, not his body and when Aladdin tries to stop him, he separates his head from his torso. Stuck with a logical, remorseless head as well as a loving, headstrong body, it is up to Jasmine and the guys to get Caliph's head separated from his body so he will reverse the spell and put Aladdin back together, as well as save the wizard's kingdom.
52	52	"The Love Bug"	Alan Zaslove	Kevin Campbell	November 22, 1994	81
Aladdin and the group go to Thundra's rain forest and find that something is tearing it down. As it turns out, Mechanicles is responsible. Thundra, finding Iago unreliable, decides to take matters into her own hands. Absent: Jasmine.
53	53	"When Chaos Comes Calling"	Rob LaDuca	Tad Stones	November 23, 1994	84
Chaos is a flying cat with godlike powers who thrives on the unpredictable. When Mirage cannot destroy Agrabah, she convinces him that the place is too commonplace and boring, so that Chaos pays Aladdin a visit. While there, he gives surprising twists to Aladdin's life, such as an evil twin and genie, and sets out to make his life more exciting. All the while, Mirage watches, unaware that this is really just a clever plan by Chaos himself to teach her a lesson about always being evil. Absent: Carpet.
54	54	"Armored and Dangerous"	Rob LaDuca	Bill Motz & Bob Roth	November 30, 1994	85
When Dominus Tusk attacks Agrabah while Aladdin and Genie are out of town on a diplomatic mission, the Sultan dons an ancient magical armor from the treasure room that gives him superhuman strength and endurance. He defeats Tusk, but when Aladdin comes back the next day, he and Jasmine notice that the Sultan's behavior is getting more violent and unpredictable. They soon find the curse of the armor is causing the Sultan to become more evil and they have to find a way to remove the curse to save the Sultan.
55	55	"Shark Treatment"	Rob LaDuca	Mirith J. Colao	January 6, 1995	52
Saleen sinks a ship bound for Agrabah with a valuable statue to lure out Aladdin and places a curse that turns him into a shark so that she can have him all to herself. As Genie, Abu and Iago have difficulty getting her necklace to reverse the curse, they realize that Saleen's sidekick, the octopus, Armand might be the key needed to get the necklace to cure Aladdin, as he has developed a grudge of being pushed aside in favor of Aladdin. Absent: Jasmine and Carpet.
56	56	"Black Sand"	Alan Zaslove	Kevin Campbell	February 2, 1995	86
When Iago notices everyone around the palace acting strangely, he suspects that the Sultan might be preparing for a party. But while Aladdin finds he might be losing it, they soon discover that Mozenrath's minions, the undead Mamluks are being used to impersonate their friends, as Mozenrath is using his Black Sand to trap them in his world, while they are replaced by Mamluks, who have taken their forms. After Aladdin is captured, it is up to Iago and Abu to distract Mozenrath and Xerxes so Carpet can mount a rescue mission. Note: In this episode, Mozenrath was voiced by Jeff Bennett.
57	57	"Love at First Sprite"	Rob LaDuca	Bill Motz and Bob Roth	February 6, 1995	64
While flying around with Carpet in the sky one day, Aladdin is spotted by several tiny sprites, who follow him home to the palace. The sprites are curious and inquisitive, not to mention destructive. The sprites soon exhibit the ability to lift Aladdin and his friends into the air, therefore, allowing them to "fly" on their own without Carpet. Feeling left out, Carpet wanders off to be with Iago, who shouts at the sprites that he already knows how to fly and Abu. Things start out friendly, but quickly turn ugly when the sprites carry Aladdin and company away in the clouds and refuse to let them go home. Genie believes that he can convince them and makes himself very big and starts yelling, demanding the sprites end their fun, but the sprites make a plan and work together to fly around Genie in circles, causing Genie to involuntarily shape-shift and find himself tied up completely in a knot. Genie is left to try to free himself, while the sprites make it clear to Aladdin and his friends that they are in control. Their demands of endless play anger Aladdin and the others, to which the sprites reply that they "do not like them anymore". To teach Aladdin and his friends a lesson, they lift the palace into the air, throw Aladdin and company inside, and drop it to the earth. Genie strains to save the day, but it is Carpet, who comes to the rescue by tricking the sprites into chasing him around and around the falling palace, therefore, slowing its progress. Everyone praises Carpet and Aladdin vows to let Carpet do the flying from here on out.
58	58	"Vocal Hero"	Rob LaDuca	Jan Strnad	February 8, 1995	88
After Iago's latest moneymaking scam of tricking the Sultan by having him place jewels in a mechanical robot he built is exposed by Aladdin and Abu, the Sultan kicks Iago out of the palace as punishment. But Amin Damoola turns the Sultan into a small gold statue. As the team must catch him to get the Sultan back with Iago, who wants to win back his trust, they are unaware that Amin's new magical devices have been supplied by Mozenrath, who wants to hold the Sultan for ransom.
59	59	"The Lost City of the Sun"	Rob LaDuca	Mirith J. Colao	February 9, 1995	82
The sprites have been captured by Mozenrath, who plans to use them to find a lost city that has a weapon needed to rule the desert. A few escape and warn Aladdin, and they head out to stop Mozenrath and rescue the other sprites. Absent: Jasmine.
60	60	"As the Netherworld Turns"	Rob LaDuca	Kevin Campbell	February 13, 1995	76
Iago and Abu locate a magic ball in Jafar's old chambers. They plan to use its magic to walk through walls, but are unaware that the real secret is that it transports them to the Netherworld, where not only does Ayam Aghoul plan to make them permanent residents, but he also plans for Aladdin to be sent there too. Absent: Carpet.
61	61	"Seems Like Old Crimes - Part One"	Alan Zaslove	Bill Motz and Bob Roth	February 16, 1995	78
One of Aladdin's old acquaintances, the Guardian of the mystical Destiny Stone, pays Agrabah a visit, asking for Aladdin's aid. Aladdin proceeds to tell the others of his life long before Genie, Jasmine or anyone but Abu. A traveling circus was visiting Agrabah and Abu's job was to steal money. Trying to steal Al's money, he met his friend for the first time, who in turn met Fatima, Minos and Aziz. They hired Al, and he and Abu gradually became friends, and he even bought Abu a fez. Aladdin refused to steal from poor citizens, but Minos and the others asked for his help one last time with getting a red gem called the Destiny Stone, which only he could reach because of his superhuman speed, reflexes and agility. Once they reached it, the Guardian warned them; that Aladdin had tried and failed to stop them, and the three disappeared, their lives changed in unknown ways. Finishing his story, Aladdin agrees to help the Guardian and visits the Destiny Stone, only to find the traps broken and the gem shattered. The group then returns to Agrabah.
62	62	"Seems Like Old Crimes - Part Two"	Rob LaDuca	Mirith J. Colao	February 17, 1995	79
Aziz has been turned into a goblin, Minos a minotaur and Fatima a harpy, and they are now wreaking havoc on Agrabah, taking its wealth. When Aladdin and the others return, they find that the three have headed for the palace, where a showdown ensues, nearly ending Al, Genie and Jasmine's lives, and finishing with the three, leaving with Abu as captive. Aziz sends his fez back for Aladdin to trace and they face off again, this time with Jasmine being captured as well in an enchanted stone meant for Aladdin. Fatima questions why she risked her life for Aladdin and she replies that Fatima would have done the same thing for Minos. Realizing that she cannot bring herself to destroy Aladdin and Jasmine's love, she protests, but Aziz will not give up, and turns on her and Minos, killing Minos. The Destiny Stone reassembles, changing Minos and Fatima back into humans, who offer Aziz a chance to be human again as well. Aziz refuses and escapes; Minos promises Aladdin they will find him, and work hard to repay their past crimes, having finally found as monsters what they had all along: friendship and love.
63	63	"From Hippsodeth, with Love"	Alan Zaslove	Mirith J. Colao	February 20, 1995	87
When Queen Hippsodeth of the Galifems sends the Sultan a love letter with a date invitation, Jasmine thinks it may be unsafe for him to go. After returning a letter declining the offer, with Iago adding a few insults, the Queen's suitor, King Pector, decides to battle the Sultan to the death for the insult. Jasmine convinces Aladdin to pretend to be the Sultan and try to call off the battle, unsuccessfully, but when the Sultan learns of this, things must be settled swiftly before King Pector kills Aladdin.
64	64	"Destiny on Fire"	Rob LaDuca	Mirith J. Colao	February 27, 1995	91
Aladdin and his friends return from vacation to find that all of Agrabah has been turned into slug-like creatures. They are rescued by Razoul, the Captain of the Royal Guards, who had escaped from the palace during the initial assault and learns that Aladdin's former accomplice Aziz is responsible. As Aladdin's friends are being turned into slugs during the quest to stop Aziz, Razoul and Aladdin, who remain openly hostile towards each other, must put their differences aside if they are to have any chance of stopping Aziz.
65	65	"The Return of Malcho"	Alan Zaslove	Kevin Campbell	February 28, 1995	90
Iago's old enemy, Malcho returns for revenge, as Aladdin is in charge as the temporary Sultan for Agrabah while the Sultan, Jasmine and the rest of the gang are on vacation. When Malcho attacks, Aladdin must fight him off and work with the Royal Guards in protecting Iago and stopping Malcho without endangering the city, as well as dealing with Razoul and Iago's pointless advice on how the real Sultan should act.
CBS
66	1	"Raiders of the Lost Shark"	Toby Shelton	Robert Schechter	September 17, 1994	12
After a giant shark which can live on land attacks Agrabah, a flying ship piloted by the ever-vigilant Captain Merc, who seeks out the shark, comes to the Sultan asking for a crew. Aladdin and Jasmine volunteer, and the gang heads out to try to defeat the shark, Aladdin with hopes of profit earned rather than given. However, as they get closer to killing and being killed, Jasmine reminds Al of his own treasure, and Merc realizes that there may be more to his life than jewels and gold. Note: This episode was previewed on The Disney Channel on May 1, 1994.
67	2	"Sneeze the Day"	Rob LaDuca	Bill Motz and Bob Roth	September 24, 1994	--
Genie accidentally gets infected with a magical cold that causes his magic to go out of control every time he sneezes, so Aladdin and Iago go after the Orb of Machana in hopes of curing him before Genie can do too much damage. Note: The production code for this episode is not known, though this episode appears to take place after "To Cure a Thief" (#11) due to the presence of a character first introduced in that episode.
68	3	"The Prophet Motive"	Toby Shelton	Jan Strnad	October 1, 1994	17
A narrator tells a tale of an evil cyclops named Fashoom, who was betrayed and turned to stone by his older brother long ago. Back in the present, the blind beggar Phasir appears to Aladdin in the marketplace, telling him of his future. Aladdin, skeptical, is soon proven wrong when Carpet is stolen by Abis Mal and Haroud. They set out to get Carpet back, but Abis Mal gets away by making his ship fly using Carpet, the "black ship flies; you cannot escape". Aladdin and Jasmine are soon captured, and while Mal takes Jasmine and the newly captive Genie to Fashoom's lair, Al is left in a dungeon. Using a skeleton, he escapes, "Find a pick among the bones", to find that Iago and Abu have helped Carpet escape. However, Carpet was the only thing keeping the ship in the sky, and it falls, with Al narrowly escaping. He pursues Mal and Haroud, just as they steal the eye of Fashoom and the cyclops is reawakened. Fashoom knocks Aladdin aside, supposedly dead, and terrorizes Abis Mal and Haroud for trying to steal his treasure. Al, Jasmine and the others meanwhile distract him, and when Fashoom fires at them with his eye, Aladdin reflects it back at him with a shield, causing a part of the cave to collapse on the cyclops. Mal tries to claim the treasure using Genie as bait, but accidentally opens a bottle of moths instead. Reunited, the gang returns home, and back in the marketplace, Phasir takes off his blindfold, revealing that he is a cyclops, Fashoom's brother who betrayed him. Note: This episode was previewed on The Disney Channel on February 27, 1994.
69	4	"That Stinking Feeling"	Alan Zaslove	Bruce Reid Schaefer	October 8, 1994	7
Iago, Abu and Carpet return from the Forbidden Oasis to find Jasmine angry at Aladdin for not asking what she wants. When a new suitor arrives, Prince Uncouthma of Odiferous, Jasmine pretends to be interested in him to make Aladdin angry. Meanwhile, Al teaches Uncouthma fake Agrabanian customs similar to Odiferan ways, in hopes of offending the Sultan and Jasmine. His plan backfires, but they soon have more important issues to deal with, as Iago has sent the prince to the Forbidden Oasis, where many razor-sharp vines and the plant protector try to kill him so Iago can get a hold of a valuable treasure. Now Al and Jasmine must put aside their anger at each other to rescue Uncouthma.
70	5	"Beast or Famine"	Bob Hathcock	Robert Schechter and Brian Swenlin	October 15, 1994	--
Aladdin, Genie and Abu are charting a trade route through the desert, when they come upon the remains of the giant shark and Merc's ship. They soon discover that mole-like people were the cause and they soon capture Genie, despite valiant effort on his part. Meanwhile, back at their lair, a shaman reveals himself to Genie and tells him his plans; to completely drain Genie of his magical energy to make himself more powerful. Back at the ship, Aladdin and Abu find that Merc is still alive, and convince him to help them repair his ship using the shark remains, Merc seeks out the mole creatures since they took away his thrill in life, the hunt. They come to the lair to find a badly exhausted Genie, and while Merc fights the creatures, Al faces off against the shaman. Genie convinces the creatures that the shaman isn't their leader, because of his hurting them, and they turn on him, the shaman is then killed by his ill-gotten magic. After some convincing, Merc chooses to be the mole creatures' leader, as they too are hunters, and Al, Genie and Abu head for home. Note: The production code for this episode is not known, though this episode takes place after "Raiders of the Lost Shark" (#12) after the Giant Shark and Merc were introduced. Absent: Jasmine, Iago and Carpet.
71	6	"The Spice is Right"	Alan Zaslove	Tom Minton	October 22, 1994	9
Aladdin finds a gift for Jasmine, a necklace which, once put on, makes her the bride for Ayam Aghoul, who quickly kicks Aladdin, Carpet, and Genie out of the palace. However, as Aladdin figures out that the spice from the treasure chest can get the necklace off Jasmine, he learns that Iago and Abu have been selling it off, with earlier assistance from Genie, for profit.
72	7	"Hero with a Thousand Feathers"	Alan Zaslove	Steve Roberts	October 29, 1994	29
Iago is foretold by Phasir that he is the one to release an ancient evil that wants to conquer Agrabah and that only the one, who releases it can defeat it. After these events come true, fearing for his safety, Iago places the blame on Genie, resulting in Genie being defeated and Agrabah being taken over. Now Iago must gather his courage to save the city.
73	8	"Witch Way Did She Go?"	Rob LaDuca	Bill Motz and Bob Roth	November 5, 1994	--
As Sadira is having a good time with Aladdin and his friends at her place, she inadvertently releases three ancient Sand Witches. When Sadira is accused of returning to her old ways due to the recent attacks, she must choose between power or friendship. Note: The production code for this episode is unknown, though this episode appears to take place after "Dune Quixote" (#54) due to Sadira having reformed, as she is no longer romantically interested in Aladdin.
74	9	"Sea No Evil"	Bob Hathcock and Rob LaDuca	Brian Swenlin	November 12, 1994	56
After Aladdin refuses to go on any more of Iago's treasure hunts, Iago and Abu are met by a spirit who gives them a seashell, meant for Aladdin, which will transport them to his world. Iago decides that since Al has refused to go after treasure, a deception is necessary and so he fakes the spirit act. They go underwater and Iago leads Genie in the wrong direction when he gets too close. They soon discover a sunken ship and the spirit instructs Aladdin to touch the figurehead; once he does, he is transported to the Netherworld and Ayam Aghoul returns. After learning that the only way for Al to return is for Aghoul to touch the figurehead, Iago and Abu desperately search for Genie. Now they must find a way to trick Aghoul into touching the ship or lose Aladdin forever. Absent: Jasmine and Carpet.
75	10	"A Sultan Worth His Salt"	Rob LaDuca	Mirith J. Colao	November 19, 1994	--
When Jasmine is captured by a clan of warrior women, who desire her allegiance, the Sultan is determined to save his daughter himself. But Aladdin and the others are a little apprehensive about letting the Sultan come along, but they have no choice. Meanwhile, Jasmine is forced to undergo a number of "initiation tests", during all of which she tries and nearly succeeds in escaping. As Jasmine races down the center of falling columns, Aladdin and the others blunder through the world of the warrior women, often falling into traps and getting stuck. During a moment of frustration, Aladdin declares to Genie, "how am i supposed to rescue Jasmine when i am always rescuing the Sultan?", to which the Sultan flares that he will find Jasmine on his own and takes off, but not without Genie on his tail. In the final confrontation, it is the Sultan, who saves the day and Aladdin learns not to underestimate his future father-in-law. Note: The production code for this episode is not known, though this episode takes place before "From Hippsodeth, With Love" (#87).
76	11	"Genie Hunt"	Alan Zaslove	Kevin Campbell & Marlowe Weisman	November 26, 1994	--
Mukhtar, who is the sole survivor of a race that once hunted genies, comes to Agrabah looking for Genie. He succeeds, but Aladdin and the others rescue him, and Mukhtar reveals he is working for hire, however, all; but one of Genie's old masters are dead, Jibraic, who wants his servant back. Mukhtar lives to hunt genies, and it will take all of Genie's wit and Aladdin's courage to stop the hunter. Note: The production code for this episode is not known, though this episode takes place before "The Hunted" (#92). Absent: Jasmine.
77	12	"The Lost Ones"	Toby Shelton	Kevin Campbell	December 3, 1994	60
Children are constantly disappearing in Agrabah and when Aladdin runs into a street rat, Wahid, he is reminded of his old friend, Amal, who had wanted to be more than just a street rat, but through dishonest means. As Aladdin and the others look into, who is taking the kids, they discover that the El Khatib, Shadow Walkers, are responsible and travel to their realm following Amal, who has become an El Khatib and who has captured Wahid. There, they discover the truth behind it all; Mirage, amassing her own force every seven years when more El Khatib can be recruited, is the true mastermind. But Wahid refuses to become an El Khatib and Mirage reveals that if he does not, he will die. Meanwhile, Amal refuses to kill Aladdin and Genie tricks Mirage into believing that Aladdin will trade his own life for Wahid's. She departs, leaving the El Khatib to die, all but Amal, who, since he had refused to kill Aladdin, is not entirely evil and hence is not a true El Khatib. Having regained his right human arm, he sets out to do more good and regain his humanity. Absent: Jasmine.
78	13	"Eye of the Beholder"	Alan Zaslove	Bill Motz and Bob Roth	December 10, 1994	--
Mirage puts Aladdin's love for Jasmine to the ultimate test. Disguised as a peddler woman, she gives Jasmine a lotion that she says will transform her into something more worthy of her man, but slowly changes her into a snake woman. Aladdin will stop at nothing to save Jasmine and be with her forever, even if it means becoming a snake man himself. Note: The production code for this episode is unknown, though this episode takes place after "In the Heat of the Fright" (#43).

=== Season 2 (1995) ===
No. overall	No. in season	Title	Directed by	Written by	Original release date	Prod. code
79	1	"The Hunted"	Alan Zaslove	Thomas Hart (teleplay); Bill Motz and Bob Roth (story)	September 16, 1995	92
A monster is in Agrabah, and soon takes Aladdin and friends captive except Genie. He reveals himself; the Mukhtar and he will only release the others if Genie agrees to help him deal with Mozenrath, who has sent Mamluks after the two. Genie reluctantly agrees and they go to the Land of the Black Sand; in Mozenrath's castle, Genie accidentally unleashes a man-eating plant on the Mukhtar. Although initially he leaves him, he finds that he cannot allow the Mukhtar to die and once he is saved, the Mukhtar vows a debt of honor. They at last find Mozenrath and the Mukhtar delivers Genie, having tricked him, to the sorcerer, who imprisons him in the Crystal of Ix, which drains Genie's powers every time it is touched. Mukhtar lies about Aladdin and the others' fate, taking his reward and once outside the castle, releasing them. Aladdin and the others naturally go after Genie, but soon all but Al are defeated, until the Mukhtar returns, imprisoning Mozenrath with magic-trapping bolas and releasing Genie. Having repaid his debt, the Mukhtar prepares to leave, but he and Genie depart as friends.
80	2	"Riders Redux"	Jamie Mitchell	Richard Stanley	September 23, 1995	93
When the treasure that the Royal Guards are transporting to a neighboring kingdom is stolen by marauders every single time with no way to stop it, under pressure, Jasmine has Aladdin and his friends look into it to prevent a potential war between the two kingdoms. But this fails as well, and Aladdin betrays the Royal Guards and his group joins up with the marauders. But Aladdin's betrayal is actually a ruse to go undercover to discover the marauders' secret weapon, which is a magic hourglass that temporarily freezes time. Things get further complicated when Agrabah hires the Riders of Ramond and Jasmine decides to accompany them during the next shipment.
81	3	"The Book of Khartoum"	Alan Zaslove	Mark Seidenberg	September 30, 1995	97
Genie and Eden are going out on the anniversary of the first time they met, but Mozenrath has other plans. He takes Genie captive and uses him to power a machine and create a Philosopher's Stone to increase his magical powers, as per the instructions of Khartoum, a wizard's head trapped inside a book. When Aladdin, Eden and the others learn of this, they go after Genie, but soon Eden too is trapped, tricked by Mozenrath into exchanging her life for Genie's, they both end up powering the machine, and aging rapidly. Meanwhile, Mozenrath completes the Philosopher's Stone and discovers that he himself has been tricked, instead of increase his powers, it releases Khartoum from his book. Aladdin frees Genie and Eden, who use the legendary Genie Embrace to restore each other's powers, and they easily defeat Khartoum by grabbing the stone and sending it into space, as it will soon self-destruct anyway. Afterward, Genie and Eden think of their adventure as their big anniversary. Absent: Jasmine (mentioned only).
82	4	"While the City Snoozes"	Alan Zaslove	Jan Strnad	October 7, 1995	94
Mirage opens an enchanted music box, which plays a tune that puts everybody near it to sleep until it is closed again. It is up to Aladdin and Jasmine to find the box before they fall asleep, and Mirage takes control of Agrabah.
83	5	"Two to Tangle"	Alan Zaslove	Mark Seidenberg	October 21, 1995	98
As Mozenrath is dying from the side effects of his magical gauntlet, he plans to switch bodies with Aladdin to prolong his life and captures him. But due to the interference of Aladdin's friends, both Aladdin and Mozenrath's spirits are sharing the same body. As the group heads off to find the Elixir of life to reverse the spell, Mozenrath plans to take the elixir to keep Aladdin's body for himself and it is up to Aladdin's spirit to prevent this from happening.
84	6	"The Ethereal"	Alan Zaslove	Brian Swenlin	November 4, 1995	95
Jasmine dreams of the coming of a powerful spirit, named the Ethereal, who will judge Agrabah, it will either be spared or destroyed. Everyone tries to convince her it was just a dream, until the signs of the Ethereal's arrival appear, and finally the Ethereal itself comes. Now Aladdin and his friends must find the one thing that marks Agrabah worthy of the Ethereal's approval before it ends up like Atlantis.
85	7	"The Shadow Knows"	Alan Zaslove	Mark Seidenberg	November 18, 1995	99
Ayam Aghoul plans to take the shadows of Aladdin and his friends with his own shadow to the nether realm, much to the disapproval of the caretaker Farabu, who he captures. The Ayam shadow succeeds in taking Aladdin and his friends' shadows. Aladdin and Genie head to the shadow world to seek Farabu's help, only to run into the living Ayam. The Sultan's shadow is taken, but Jasmine and her friends go to the shadow world, while Aladdin tricks Ayam into freeing Farabu. Ayam is banished to the nether realm and everyone's shadows return to them.
86	8	"The Great Rift"	Alan Zaslove	Mark Seidenberg	November 25, 1995	96
Aladdin is seeking the land of Mesmaria in the desert. Iago finds a treasure chest. In it, there are four gemstones, but a hawk snatches one. When the sunlight touches the gem, the sorceress queen, Deluca, arises, as the hawk is revealed to be her husband, king Zahbar. She takes back the gems Aladdin took and summons her three brothers, despite her husband's objections. Deluca turns the Sultan and Jasmine into gemstones and kicks Aladdin out of the palace. The family begins to fight over the throne, which summons the same Great Rift that destroyed Mesmaria. When Aladdin pleads to Deluca to stop the Great Rift, Zahbar agrees with him, until Deluca teleports him back to Mesmaria. Aladdin finds Zahbar at the ruins of Mesmaria and learns what happened, as he states that the Magic Emerald of Khufu poisoned her heart. After taking Deluca's emerald, Aladdin destroys it, which undoes Deluca's curses, changes Zahbar back to his human form, depowers the emeralds of Deluca's brothers, and removes the Great Rift. The family is welcomed to Agrabah.
