= Disney's Aladdin in Nasira's Revenge =

2000 video game

- European PlayStation cover art
- Developer: Argonaut Games
- Publishers: Disney Interactive (PC); Sony Computer Entertainment (PlayStation)
- Producers: Ben Tuszynski; Craig Howard
- Designers: William Carter; Alex Cullum; Jake Fearnside; Alex Rutter; Iain Wright; Bryan Verboon; Lynsey Bradshaw
- Artist: Matt Startin
- Composer: Rob Lord
- Series: Aladdin
- Platforms: PlayStation, Windows
- Release: PlayStation: EU: December 1, 2000; NA: March 14, 2001; Windows: EU: 2000; NA: 2001
- Genre: Platform
- Mode: Single-player

Disney's Aladdin in Nasira's Revenge (a.k.a. Disney's Aladdin 2: The Video Game) is a platform video game developed by Argonaut Games and published by Sony Computer Entertainment for the PlayStation. Disney Interactive released the game on Windows. It takes place after the events of The Return of Jafar and before Aladdin and the King of Thieves. In the game, Aladdin, Abu and Jasmine fight against Jafar's sister Nasira who wants to bring him back to life. Nasira's Revenge received generally average reviews.

== Gameplay ==
The player assumes control of three total characters in the game: Aladdin, Abu, and Jasmine. Aladdin's abilities range from sword fighting to jumping to stomping. Abu can jump, roll, and climb on walls to a certain degree. Jasmine's character is hiding in a pot for her level so the player can hide and hop. The player collects gold coins throughout each level and fights a variety of villains. The game's environments vary greatly and allow a lot of interaction. There are minigames at the end of each level: pie throwing, surfing, skateboarding, and cloud jumping.

== Levels ==
- Agrabah: Something terrible has happened at the Sultan’s Palace and Aladdin must get there right away. Unfortunately, there are wanted posters with his name on them and guards hot on his tail. With the help of Genie and Abu, Aladdin navigates the streets of Agrabah.
- The Palace: The Sultan’s palace has been taken over by Nasira and her enchanted guards. Aladdin needs to make his way to the throne room to confront the sorceress and find out what has happened to the Sultan and Princess Jasmine.
- The Dungeon: Aladdin has been imprisoned in the dungeon and it is up to Abu to rescue him. Using his agility and skill, Abu has to dodge guards and booby traps in order to set Aladdin free.
- The Oasis: Aladdin follows the advice of a mystic to once again seek out the Cave of Wonders. First, he must find the lost scarab, key to the cave’s entrance.
- The Cave of Wonders: A vast desert will soon unveil the mythical Cave of Wonders to Aladdin and Abu, who follow paths of gold and gems in search of the banished Genie. They then escape on the magic Carpet before the cave collapses.
- The Pyramid: Aladdin’s quest to rescue his friends leads him to the ancient pyramids. First, he has to find the Book of the Dead to gain entry. Inside the dark tombs, Aladdin must contend with mummies, snakes, Sphinx guards, while uncovering mechanical puzzles to make his way through the labyrinth of hallways. Aladdin braves the dangers to rescue Jasmine.
- The Crumbled Palace (The Crumbling Place/Crumbe of Palace): Jasmine returns to find the beloved palace in shambles and ruins after the tyrannical Nasira passed through it. With only a pot to hide in from the witch's henchmen, Jasmine sneaks through the darkness of the palace to retrieve a vital road map for Aladdin to lead him onward to the legendary Ancient City.
- The Ancient City (Ancient City): Aladdin runs at top speed along a mountainous cliff wall upwards towards an ancient, forgotten city searching for Nasira's secret lair. He enters a city in decay at night, populated by thieves and living skeletons.
- Nasira's Lair: The final battle between good and evil begins as Aladdin descends into the fiery depths of the volcano pit where Nasira prepares to bring back Jafar from the Underworld.

The game also includes mini games at the end of each level—pie throwing, surfing, skate-boarding, and cloud jumping.

== Plot ==
Disney's Aladdin in Nasira's Revenge is set after the events of The Return of Jafar, during the television series and before Aladdin and the King of Thieves. As the game begins, Agrabah is in peril again, this time threatened by the evil sorceress Nasira (Jodi Benson).

The evil witch Nasira begins her plot by taking over the palace with a spell and kidnapping Jasmine (Linda Larkin) and the Sultan (Val Bettin). She then commands the guard's captain Razoul (Jim Cummings) to bring Aladdin (Scott Weinger) to her dead or alive. She also imprisons the Genie (Dan Castellaneta) in the Cave of Wonders, and removes his magical powers. Nasira believes that if she collects a set of ancient relics that are spread all over Agrabah she might be able to revive her brother Jafar (Jonathan Freeman) and take over the world, and so she uses her captives to force Aladdin into doing this job for her. The game ends with Nasira resurrecting Jafar in her volcanic lair, but Aladdin manages to smash the artifacts and destroy him once again while Nasira herself flees and apparently survives.

== Reception ==
Reception

Aggregate score
Aggregator	Score
Metacritic	61/100

Review scores
Publication	Score
AllGame	2.5/5
Electronic Gaming Monthly	4.33/10 (Note: Three critics of Electronic Gaming Monthly gave the PlayStation version each a score of 4/10, 3.5/10, and 5.5/10.)
EP Daily	6.5/10
Game Informer	6/10
GameSpot	6.3/10
IGN	6/10
Jeuxvideo.com	(PS) 15/20 (PC) 12/20
Next Generation	3/5
Official U.S. PlayStation Magazine	2/5
PlayStation: The Official Magazine	6/10

The PlayStation version received "mixed" reviews according to the review aggregation website Metacritic. David Chen of NextGen, however, called it "A nicely made game – on the easy side, but perfect for kids." Human Tornado of GamePro called it "a fun experience that's more suited to younger gamers." (Note: GamePro gave the PlayStation version two 3.5/5 scores for graphics and sound, and two 3/5 scores for control and fun factor.)
