= Aladdin (animated TV series) =

American animated television series

- Also known as: Disney's Aladdin: The Series
- Genre: Animated series; Action/Adventure; Fantasy; Comedy drama; Mystery; Romance
- Based on: Aladdin by Walt Disney Feature Animation
- Developed by: Tad Stones; Alan Zaslove
- Directed by: Alan Zaslove; Rob LaDuca; Bob Hathcock; Toby Shelton; Jamie Mitchell
- Voices of: Scott Weinger; Linda Larkin; Dan Castellaneta; Gilbert Gottfried; Frank Welker; Val Bettin
- Opening theme: "Arabian Nights", performed by Brian Hannan
- Ending theme: "Arabian Nights" (Instrumental)
- Composers: Mark Watters; John Given; Harvey Cohen; Carl Johnson; Thomas Richard Sharp; Danny Beckermann; Bruce Rowland
- Country of origin: United States
- Original language: English
- No. of seasons: 2
- No. of episodes: 86 (list of episodes)

Production
- Producers: Tad Stones; Alan Zaslove
- Running time: 22 minutes
- Production company: Walt Disney Television Animation

Original release
- Network: Syndication; CBS
- Release: September 5, 1994 – November 25, 1995

Related
- Aladdin; The Return of Jafar; Aladdin and the King of Thieves; "Hercules and the Arabian Night"

Aladdin (also known as Aladdin: The Series or Disney's Aladdin: The Series) is an American animated television series based on Disney’s 1992 animated feature film of the same name and produced by Walt Disney Television Animation. It aired from September 5, 1994, to November 25, 1995, concluding exactly three years to the day from the release of the original film. It serves as a continuation of The Return of Jafar (1994), and is followed up by Aladdin and the King of Thieves (1996).

The series was produced by Alan Zaslove and Tad Stones, who were known for their work on Chip 'n Dale: Rescue Rangers and Darkwing Duck. Many of the films' stars provided the voices of their TV counterparts, with the exceptions of Dan Castellaneta, filling in for Robin Williams, as The Genie (like in The Return of Jafar), until Williams later returned to reprise his role in Aladdin and the King of Thieves, and Val Bettin as the Sultan (who replaced Douglas Seale after the original film).

The series originally aired as a preview on Disney Channel in early 1994, and in September of that year it began airing concurrently on the syndicated The Disney Afternoon block and on Saturday mornings on CBS (prior to Disney's purchase of rival ABC). Disney Channel reran the series from 1997 until 2000. The show was shown on Toon Disney from April 1998 until December 2008.

== Plot ==
The series is set in the fictional sultanate of Agrabah. It takes place one year after the original film, and is set after the second film. Aladdin, now engaged to Princess Jasmine, embarks on numerous adventures with his companions, both within and outside of Agrabah. These adventures often include solving mysteries, finding treasures, and encountering various enemies, such as Abis Mal (an incompetent thief), Mechanicles (a mad Greek inventor), Mozenrath (a young evil power-hungry sorcerer), and Mirage (an evil cat-like enchantress).

== Episodes ==
Season	Episodes		Originally released		
Season	Episodes		First released	Last released	Network
1	78	65	September 5, 1994	February 28, 1995	Syndicated (The Disney Afternoon)
1	78	13	September 17, 1994	December 10, 1994	CBS
2	8		September 16, 1995	November 25, 1995	CBS

A total of 86 episodes were produced, making this series one of the few exceptions to Disney's then-limit of 65 episodes. The direct-to-video film Aladdin and the King of Thieves serves as the series finale. It was followed by a guest appearance on November 24, 1998, in "Hercules and the Arabian Night", an episode of Hercules: The Animated Series.

== Characters ==
=== Main ===
- Aladdin (voiced by Scott Weinger) was originally a street urchin who stole food to survive, but his life changed when he met and fell in love with Jasmine, the Princess of Agrabah. Aladdin is engaged to marry Jasmine and will eventually become Prince and eventually Sultan. He learns of his future responsibilities while protecting the kingdom from monsters, sorcerers and other dangers.
- Genie (voiced by Dan Castellaneta) is one of Aladdin's best friends. Freed from his lamp and able to use his magic freely, Genie helps Aladdin in his adventures to protect Agrabah. However, Genie's magic does not always work successfully, as he has become somewhat less powerful once he was freed, describing his powers as "semi-phenomenal, nearly cosmic". He still wears his golden shackles despite having been freed from his lamp because he is "a slave to fashion".
- Princess Jasmine (voiced by Linda Larkin) was forced by her father to marry a prince, but her life changed for the better when she ran away from home and met and fell in love with the man of her dreams, Aladdin. Jasmine is no ordinary princess as she is strong-willed, independent, defiant yet loving and kind-hearted. She is quite flirty and seductive. She wants to live a life where she is free to make her own choices and to not let others control her. Now with more independence, Jasmine starts to experience things that she had never done before.
- Iago (voiced by Gilbert Gottfried): Though he may have cleaned up his act, Iago is still very greedy and constantly wishes to have riches and power in his life. Iago sometimes causes trouble for the gang as he leads them on treasure hunts that turn out to be dangerous. Though he may be quick-tempered, Iago has a good heart deep down and always does the right thing in the end. Iago also has the talent of being able to imitate other peoples' voices.
- Abu (voiced by Frank Welker) is the charming, mischievous, yet closest friend of Aladdin. Abu is known to be a master thief and has his eyes set on gold and jewels. Abu and Iago have become good friends and work together on many occasions to gain money and riches beyond their wildest dreams.
- Magic Carpet is a loyal friend who was once a resident of the Cave of Wonders' treasure room. He is the mode of transportation for Aladdin and his friends, as well as a constant games partner for Genie.
- The Sultan (voiced by Val Bettin) is Jasmine's kind-hearted father, ruler of Agrabah, who allowed the engagement between her and Aladdin.

=== Other characters and villains ===
- Eden (voiced by Valery Pappas)
- Dhandi (voiced by Debi Derryberry)
- Abis Mal (voiced by Jason Alexander)
- Haroud Hazi Bin (voiced by James Avery)
- Sadira (voiced by Kellie Martin)
- Mozenrath (voiced by Jonathan Brandis)
- Amin Damoola / Queen Deluca's Brother #1 (voiced by Jeff Bennett)
- Mechanicles (voiced by Charlie Adler)
- Razoul / Prince Wazoo / The Sand Monster / Dominus Tusk / Hamar / Akbar / Queen Deluca's Brother #2 (voiced by Jim Cummings)
- Rajah / Hakim / Fazal / Nahbi / Xerxes / Queen Deluca's Brother #3 (voiced by Frank Welker)
- Arbutus / General Gouda (voiced by Ron Perlman)
- Khartoum (voiced by Tony Jay)
- Fasir (voiced by Ed Gilbert)
- Mirage (voiced by Bebe Neuwirth)
- Aziz (voiced by Michael Bell)
- Minos / King Zahbar (voiced by Keith David)
- Fatima (voiced by Charity James)
- Uncouthma (voiced by Tino Insana)
- Chaos (voiced by Matt Frewer)
- Saleen (voiced by Julie Brown)
- Malcho (voiced by Héctor Elizondo)
- Caliph Kapok / Amok Mon Ra (voiced by Tim Curry)
- Thundra (voiced by Candi Milo)
- Queen Deluca (voiced by Tress MacNeille)
- Ayam Aghoul (voiced by Hamilton Camp)
- Magma (voiced by Tone Loc)
- Sootinai / Merc (voiced by Dorian Harewood)
- Ajed Al Gebraic (voiced by Jonathan Harris)
- Nefir Hasenuf (voiced by René Auberjonois)
- Queen Hippsodeth (voiced by Kate Mulgrew)
- Sultan Pasta Al Dente (voiced by Stuart Pankin)
- Scara (voiced by Susan Tolsky)
- Shaman (voiced by Malcolm McDowell)
- King Mamood (voiced by Tahj Mowry)
- Kwanseer (voiced by Ron Glass)

== Animation ==
The animated television series was animated by Walt Disney Television Animation (Australia) Pty. Limited, Walt Disney Animation Japan, Inc., Toon City Animation, Inc., in Manila, Philippines, Kennedy Cartoons in Manila, Philippines and Kennedy Cartoons in Toronto, Ontario, Canada, Guimarares Productions in São Paulo, Brasil, Moving Images International (working with Toon City on the show's episodes) in Manila, Philippines, Animal-ya (also known as Animal House), Tama Productions, Wang Film Productions Co., Ltd., Sunwoo Animation Co., Ltd., Jaime Diaz Producciones S.A., and Pacific Rim Productions, Inc. The additional production facilities for Walt Disney Animation (Japan) Inc.-animated episodes are Tama Production, Jade Animation, Light Foot, Nakumara Productions, Studios CATS, Studios Fuga, Studios Robin, Takahashi Productions, and Unlimited Energee.

== Home media ==
=== VHS and LaserDisc releases ===
Nine VHS cassettes and two double-feature LaserDiscs containing eighteen episodes of the series were released in the United States and Canada (including four VHS cassettes of the Princess Collection: Jasmine's Enchanted Tales set, which contain eight episodes).

VHS name	Episode titles	Release date	Stock number
Aladdin's Arabian Adventures: Creatures of Invention	"Getting the Bugs Out" & "The Sands of Fate"	July 21, 1995	5361
Aladdin's Arabian Adventures: Magic Makers	"Never Say Nefir" & "The Citadel"	July 21, 1995	5363
Aladdin & Jasmine's Moonlight Magic	"Moonlight Madness" & "Some Enchanted Genie"	January 10, 1996	6704
Aladdin's Arabian Adventures: Fearless Friends	"Much Abu About Something" & "The Day the Bird Stood Still"	February 28, 1996	6716
Aladdin's Arabian Adventures: Team Genie	"Sneeze the Day" & "Genie Hunt"	February 28, 1996	6715

Princess Collection - Jasmine's Enchanted Tales

VHS name	Episode titles	Release date	Stock number
Princess Collection - Jasmine's Enchanted Tales: The Greatest Treasure	"Garden of Evil" & "Elemental, My Dear Jasmine"	April 7, 1995	4081
Princess Collection - Jasmine's Enchanted Tales: Jasmine's Wish	"Do the Rat Thing" & "Bad Mood Rising"	April 7, 1995	4083
Princess Collection - Jasmine's Enchanted Tales: True Hearts	"Eye of the Beholder" & "SandSwitch"	February 28, 1996	6718
Princess Collection - Jasmine's Enchanted Tales: Magic and Mystery	"The Secret of Dagger Rock" & "Forget Me Lots"	February 28, 1996	6719

==== Australia and New Zealand releases ====
Twelve VHS cassettes containing 24 episodes of the series were released in Australia and New Zealand. The series' home video releases from North American and Europe were also available on VHS, LaserDisc and Video CD in Asia, the Middle East, South Africa, and South America.

VHS name	Episode titles	Release date
Aladdin's Arabian Adventures (Volume 1): Aladdin to the Rescue	"The Spice is Right" & "Fowl Weather"	February 2, 1996
Aladdin's Arabian Adventures (Volume 2): Genie in a Jar	"The Prophet Motive" & "Mudder's Day"	February 2, 1996
Aladdin's Arabian Adventures (Volume 3): Treasures of Doom	"To Cure a Thief" & "My Fair Aladdin"	February 2, 1996
Aladdin's Arabian Adventures (Volume 4): Creatures of Invention	"Getting the Bugs Out" & "The Sands of Fate"	October 18, 1996
Aladdin's Arabian Adventures (Volume 5): Magic Makers	"Never Say Nefir" & "The Citadel"	October 18, 1996
Aladdin's Arabian Adventures (Volume 6): Fearless Friends	"Much Abu About Something" & "The Day the Bird Stood Still"	March 21, 1997
Aladdin's Arabian Adventures (Volume 7): Team Genie	"Sneeze the Day" & "Genie Hunt"	March 21, 1997
Aladdin's Arabian Adventures (Volume 8): Aladdin & Jasmine's Moonlight Magic	"Moonlight Madness" & "Some Enchanted Genie"	August 15, 1997
Aladdin's Arabian Adventures (Volume 9): The Magic Mask	"The Secret of Dagger Rock" and "The Ethereal"	August 15, 1997
Aladdin's Arabian Adventures (Volume 10): Winner Takes Aladdin	"Strike Up the Sand" and "SandSwitch"	August 15, 1997
Aladdin's Arabian Adventures (Volume 11): The Magic Trap	"Lost and Founded" & "Web of Fear"	August 15, 1997
Aladdin's Arabian Adventures (Volume 12): Sea No Evil	"Sea No Evil" & "When Chaos Comes Calling"	August 15, 1997

=== DVD releases ===
The series has not been fully released on DVD, but on March 14, 2005, three episodes of the series were released on the Jasmine's Enchanted Tales: Journey of a Princess DVD release. Also, four episodes were released as part of the Disney Princess DVD titles, all of which were also available on VHS.

DVD name	Episode titles	Release date	Note
Disney Princess Stories: Volume 1	"Bad Mood Rising"	September 7, 2004	
Disney Princess Party: Volume 2	"SandSwitch"	February 15, 2005	
Disney Princess Stories: Volume 2	"Love at First Sprite"	February 15, 2005	
Jasmine's Enchanted Tales: Journey of a Princess	"Elemental, My Dear Jasmine", "Garden of Evil" & "Do the Rat Thing"	March 14, 2005	
Disney Princess Stories: Volume 3	"Eye of the Beholder"	September 6, 2005	

== Accolades ==
Year	Ceremony	Category	Nominee(s)	Result
1995	22nd Daytime Emmy Awards	Outstanding Animated Children's Program	Alan Zaslove and Tad Stones	Nominated
1995	22nd Daytime Emmy Awards	Outstanding Film Sound Editing	Ray Leonard, Charles Rychwalski, Tom Jaeger, Phyllis Ginter, Kenneth Young, Michael Geisler, Greg LaPlante, Timothy J. Borquez, Michael Gollom, Jim Hodson, Marc S. Perlman, Robert Duran, Bill Koepnick, Melissa Ellis, Jennifer Mertens, John O. Robinson III, William Griggs, and Alex Wilkinson	Won
1995	22nd Daytime Emmy Awards	Outstanding Film Sound Mixing	Deb Adair, Melissa Ellis, Jim Hodson, Timothy J. Garrity, Timothy J. Borquez, and Bill Koepnick	Won
1995	22nd Daytime Emmy Awards	Outstanding Music Direction and Composition	Mark Watters, John Given, Harvey Cohen, Carl Johnson, and Thomas Richard Sharp	Won
1995	23rd Annie Awards	Best Individual Achievement for Writing in the Field of Animation	Doug Langdale (for the episode "Do the Rat Thing")	Nominated
1995	23rd Annie Awards	Best Individual Achievement in Storyboarding in the Field of Animation	Warwick Gilbert (for the episode "The Lost One")	Nominated
1995	23rd Annie Awards	Best Individual Achievement in Storyboarding in the Field of Animation	Denise Koyama (for the episode "The Secret of Dagger Rock")	Nominated
1996	23rd Daytime Emmy Awards	Outstanding Achievement in Animation	Mircea Mantta, Gerard Baldwin, Barbara Dourmaskin-Case, Alan Zaslove, Jamie Thomason, Rob LaDuca, Dale Case, Bob Roth, Bill Motz, Mark Seidenberg, Mirith J. Colao, Denise Koyama, and Lonnie Lloyd	Nominated
1996	23rd Daytime Emmy Awards	Outstanding Sound Editing - Special Class	Ernesto Mas, Jennifer Mertens, William Griggs, Kenneth Young, Charles Rychwalski, and Cecil Broughton	Nominated
1996	23rd Daytime Emmy Awards	Outstanding Sound Mixing - Special Class	Allen L. Stone, Michael Jiron, and Deb Adair	Won
