= Linda Larkin =

American actress

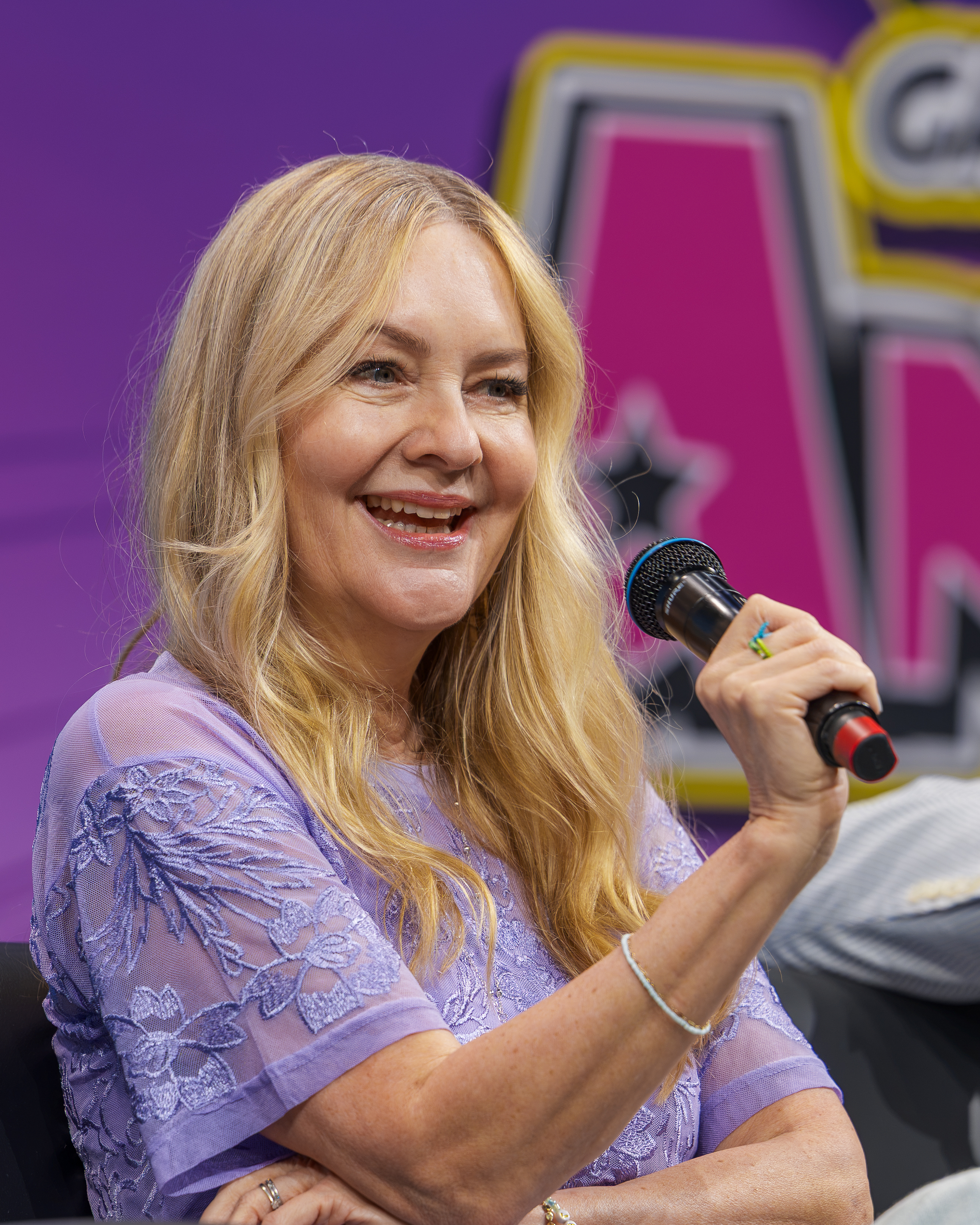
- Larkin at Animate! Columbus in 2026
- Born: March 20, 1970 (age 56); Alaska, U.S.
- Occupation: Actress
- Years active: 1990–present
- Spouse: Yul Vazquez (m. 2002)
- Awards: Disney Legend (2011)

Linda Larkin (born March 20, 1970) is an American actress, best known for her role as the speaking voice of Princess Jasmine in Disney's 1992 animated feature film Aladdin.

== Early life ==
Larkin was born in Alaska and raised in Duluth, Minnesota.

== Career ==
Larkin began her career in 1990, with the film Zapped Again! as Joanne.

She provided the voice of Princess Jasmine in the 1992 Disney film Aladdin. Disney required her to lower her voice for the role, as her natural speaking voice was considered too high-pitched.

Larkin has reprised the role as Jasmine in the sequels and various other media, including The Return of Jafar and Aladdin and the King of Thieves, as well as in the television series, the Hercules crossover with Aladdin, House of Mouse, Sofia the First, Ralph Breaks the Internet, and the Kingdom Hearts and Disney Infinity video game series.

For her work at Disney, Larkin was honored as a Disney Legend on August 19, 2011.

== Personal life ==
She has been married to actor and musician Yul Vazquez since 2002.

== Filmography ==
=== Film ===
Year	Title	Role	Notes
1990	Zapped Again!	Joanne	
1992	Aladdin	Princess Jasmine	Voice
1994	The Return of Jafar	Princess Jasmine	Voice, direct-to-video
1996	Aladdin and the King of Thieves	Princess Jasmine	Voice, direct-to-video
1996	Basquiat	Fan	
1997	Childhood's End	Caroline Ballard	
1998	My Girlfriend's Boyfriend	Cory Lindross	
1999	Personals	unknown role	
1999	Two Ninas	Carrie Boxer	
1999	Final Rinse	Trudy Tackle	
1999	Runaway Bride	Gill's girlfriend	
2000	The Next Best Thing	Kelly	
2000	Fear of Fiction	Liz	
2000	Custody	Polly	
2004	Knots	Annette	
2005	Disney Princess Party: Volume Two	Princess Jasmine	Voice, direct-to-video
2005	The Maw	Nicole Hanson	
2005	Summer Belongs Movie	Summer	
2007	Joshua	Ms. Karen Danforth	
2007	You Belong to Me	Clara	
2007	Disney Princess Enchanted Tales: Follow Your Dreams	Princess Jasmine	Voice, direct-to-video
2008	The Maw 2: Save Planet	Nicole Hanson	
2015	Amok	Jen	
2018	Ralph Breaks the Internet	Princess Jasmine	Voice

=== Television ===
Year	Title	Role	Notes
1990	Ferris Bueller	Stacy	Episode: "Between a Rock and Rooney's Place"
1991	Murder, She Wrote	Waitress	Episode: "Family Doctor"
1991	Doogie Howser, M.D.	Kelly	Episode: "Dances with Wanda"
1993	Almost Home	Kim	Episode: "You Ought to Be in Pictures"
1993	Wings	Lisa	Episode: "Bye-Bye, Bunny"
1994	Evening Shade	Denise	Episode: "The Odder Couple"
1994–1995	Aladdin	Princess Jasmine	Voice, main role (60 episodes)
1995	Aladdin on Ice	Princess Jasmine	Voice, television film
1995	New York News	unknown role	Episode: "You Thought the Pope Was Something"
1995–1996	The Twisted Tales of Felix the Cat	Girls, Additional voices	4 episodes
1996	Our Son, the Matchmaker	Melanie Miller	Television film
1998	Trinity	Alycia	2 episodes
1999	Hercules	Princess Jasmine	Voice, episode: "Hercules and the Arabian Night"
2002	House of Mouse	Princess Jasmine	Voice, episode: "Ladies Night"
2007	Law & Order: Criminal Intent	Miriam Lemle	Episode: "30"
2013	Sofia the First	Princess Jasmine	Voice, episode: "Two to Tangu"
2018–2019	Disney Comics in Motion	Princess Jasmine	Voice, 2 episodes

=== Video games ===
Year	Title	Role	Notes
1998	Aladdin's Math Quest	Princess Jasmine	
2001	Disney's Aladdin in Nasira's Revenge	Princess Jasmine	
2002	Darkened Skye	Skye of Lynlorra	
2002	Kingdom Hearts	Princess Jasmine	
2006	Kingdom Hearts II	Princess Jasmine	
2011	Kinect: Disneyland Adventures	Princess Jasmine	
2013	Grand Theft Auto V	Violet (Impotent Rage), The Local Population	
2013	Disney Infinity	Princess Jasmine	
2015	Disney Infinity 3.0	Princess Jasmine	
2023	Disney Speedstorm	Princess Jasmine	
2025	Disney Dreamlight Valley	Princess Jasmine	
