= Alan Zaslove =

American animator, producer, and director (1927–2019)

- Born: Alan Louis Zaslove; December 9, 1927; New York, New York, U.S.
- Died: October 2, 2019 (aged 91); Sherman Oaks, California, U.S.
- Occupations: Animator, producer, director
- Years active: 1943–2005
- Children: 3 (including Mark)

Alan Louis Zaslove (December 9, 1927 – October 2, 2019) was an American animator, producer and director of animated series. His career spanned some six decades, beginning as an office boy at Leon Schlesinger Productions in 1943 and taking in United Productions of America, Hanna-Barbera and Disney Television Animation, where he was among the first directors the studio hired and worked on several of the series that made up The Disney Afternoon.

== Early life and career ==
=== Schlesinger and UPA ===
Zaslove began his career in 1943 as an "office boy" for Leon Schlesinger Productions with no previous involvement in animation. He was promoted to in-betweener before his career was interrupted by military service during World War II. He went on to work for United Productions of America, starting as an assistant animator to Bill Melendez before progressing to an official animator. He contributed to the animation of Gerald McBoing-Boing and Mr. Magoo. He was also one of the sequence directors on the studio's animated feature 1001 Arabian Nights (1959).

=== Television animation ===
Zaslove worked on several cartoons in film and television including The Alvin Show, Roger Ramjet, Popeye the Sailor, The Famous Adventures of Mr. Magoo, A Charlie Brown Christmas, The Phantom Tollbooth, Fractured Fairy Tales, George of the Jungle, Carnival of the Animals, The Hoober-Bloob Highway, Tom Thumb, The Night Before Christmas, and Stanley, the Ugly Duckling.

At Hanna-Barbera, Zaslove worked on several of their works such as Space Stars, Yogi's Treasure Hunt, Paw Paws, The Smurfs, The 13 Ghosts of Scooby-Doo, The Challenge of the GoBots, Snorks, the 1985 revival of The Jetsons, the 1985 animated film of Pound Puppies, and Galtar and the Golden Lance.

=== Disney Television Animation ===
During Zaslove's time at Disney, he produced and directed several animated television shows and direct-to-video films including DuckTales, Aladdin, Adventures of the Gummi Bears, Darkwing Duck, Chip 'n Dale Rescue Rangers (which he co-created with Tad Stones), The Return of Jafar, Jasmine's Enchanted Tales: Journey of a Princess and Pocahontas II: Journey to a New World, earning two Daytime Emmy Award nominations.

=== Later work ===
He later served as a supervising producer and director on The New Woody Woodpecker Show at Universal Cartoon Studios, the last credit of his career.

== Death ==
Zaslove died on October 2, 2019, at the age of 91.

== Selected filmography ==
=== Film ===
- 1001 Arabian Nights (1959) – sequence director
- A Charlie Brown Christmas (1965) – animator
- The Phantom Tollbooth (1970) – animator
- Pound Puppies (1985)
- The Return of Jafar (1994) – director
- Pocahontas II: Journey to a New World (1998) – director

=== Television ===
- The Alvin Show (1961–1962)
- Fractured Fairy Tales
- Roger Ramjet
- George of the Jungle (1967)
- The Smurfs
- Adventures of the Gummi Bears (1985–1991) – director
- DuckTales (1987–1990) – producer, director
- Chip 'n Dale Rescue Rangers (1989–1990) – co-creator, producer, director
- Darkwing Duck (1991–1992) – director
- Aladdin (1994–1995) – producer, director
- The New Woody Woodpecker Show (1999–2002) – supervising producer, director
