= Val Bettin =

American actor (1923–2021)

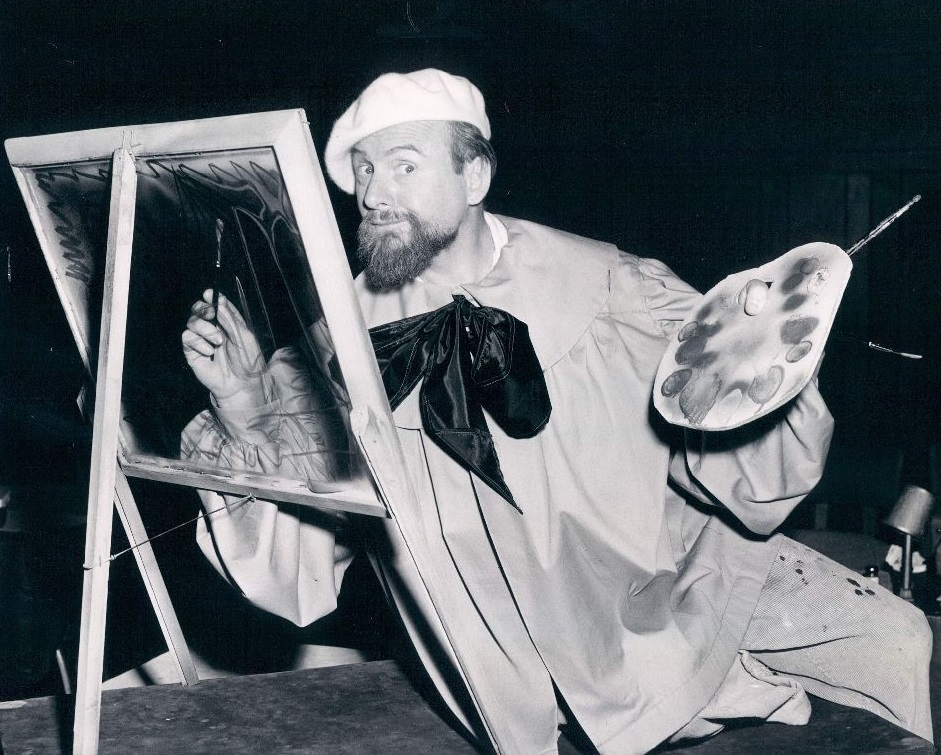
- Bettin in 1963
- Born: Valentine John Bettin; July 8, 1923; La Crosse, Wisconsin, U.S.
- Died: January 7, 2021 (aged 97); Ventura, California, U.S.
- Resting place: Ivy Lawn Memorial Park
- Occupation: Actor
- Years active: 1953–2008
- Agent: CESD Talent Agency
- Spouse: Hildy Pender (m. 1950; died 2007)

Valentine John Bettin (July 8, 1923 – January 7, 2021) was an American actor, known for using an English accent in all of his roles. He is perhaps best known for voicing Dr. David Q. Dawson in the 1986 Disney animated film The Great Mouse Detective and the Sultan in the two direct-to-video sequels (The Return of Jafar and Aladdin and the King of Thieves) to Disney's Aladdin, as well as the TV show, taking over for Douglas Seale. Bettin also hosted The Storyteller, a children's show on Chicago television in the late 1950s.

== Early life and career ==
He was born in La Crosse, Wisconsin on July 8, 1923. In 1948, he went to England to enroll in the Royal Academy of Dramatic Arts and graduated in 1950. There he met his wife Hildy in 1950, and the two married that same year. They returned to the United States in order for him to become a drama teacher in Iowa.

Bettin's first film role was in 1980's Somewhere in Time. He later became a voice actor, with his first role as Dr. David Q. Dawson in the 1986 Disney film The Great Mouse Detective. His credits included Shrek, Gargoyles, Mighty Ducks: The Animated Series and W.I.T.C.H..

== Personal life ==
He married Hildy Pender, from Manchester, England, in 1950. She died in Ventura, California on August 16, 2007, at the age of 82.

Bettin died of natural causes in Ventura on January 7, 2021, at the age of 97. He was buried at Ivy Lawn Memorial Park on 3 March.

== Filmography ==
=== Film ===
Year	Title	Role	Notes
1980	Somewhere in Time	Director, in 1912	
1983	The Man Who Wasn't There	Monocle	
1983	The Young Landlords	Mr. Bender	TV film
1986	Triplecross	Winslow	TV film
1986	The Great Mouse Detective	Dr. David Q. Dawson/Thug Guard	Voice role
1990	Voices Within: The Lives of Truddi Chase	Playwright	TV film
1994	Aladdin: The Return of Jafar	The Sultan	Voice role, direct-to-video
1995	The Greatest Treasure	The Sultan	Voice role, direct-to-video
1995	Jasmine's Wish	The Sultan	Voice role, direct-to-video
1996	True Hearts	The Sultan	Voice role, direct-to-video
1996	Magic and Mystery	The Sultan	Voice role, direct-to-video
1996	Aladdin and the King of Thieves	The Sultan	Voice role, direct-to-video
1996	Entertaining Angels: The Dorothy Day Story	Mr. Breen	
2001	Shrek	Bishop	Voice role

=== Television ===
Year	Title	Role	Notes
1982	Mork & Mindy/Laverne & Shirley/Fonz Hour	Additional voices	Episode: "Who's Minding the Brat?", voice role
1987	Disneyland	Dr. Allworth	Episode: "Young Harry Houdini"
1988	Webster	Edwin	Episode: "Nerds Are People Too"
1992	Great Scott!	Pythagorean	Episode: "Hair Scare"
1994–1995	Aladdin	Sultan	Series regular, voice role
1995	American Masters	John Latrobe	Episode: "Edgar Allan Poe: Terror of the Soul"
1996	Mighty Ducks	Sarks	Episode: "Mondo-Man", voice role
1996	Gargoyles: The Goliath Chronicles	Egon Pax	Episode: "To Serve Mankind", voice role
1997	Pepper Ann	Sanford I. Paper	Episode: "The Big Pencil/Sani-Paper", voice role
1998	Hercules	King Tivius	Episode: "Hercules and the Jilt Trip", voice role
2005	W.I.T.C.H.	Herbert Olsen	Episode: "The Mogriffs", voice role; final role

=== Video games ===
Year	Title	Role	Notes
1997	Zork: Grand Inquisitor	Sneffle / Flickering Torch	
1999	Tarzan	Professor Porter	
1999	Disney's Activity Center: Tarzan	Professor Porter	
2000	Aladdin in Nasira's Revenge	Sultan	

=== Audiobooks ===
- Quest for Camelot Audio Action-Adventure (1998) - Narrator
