= The Return of Jafar =

1994 American film

- Home video release poster
- Directed by: Toby Shelton; Tad Stones; Alan Zaslove
- Written by: Kevin Campbell; Mirith J.S. Colao; Bill Motz; Steve Roberts; Dev Ross; Bob Roth; Jan Strnad; Brian Swenlin
- Story by: Duane Capizzi; Doug Langdale; Mark McCorkle; Robert Schooley; Tad Stones
- Produced by: Tad Stones; Alan Zaslove
- Starring: Gilbert Gottfried; Jason Alexander; Jonathan Freeman; Scott Weinger; Linda Larkin; Dan Castellaneta
- Edited by: Robert S. Birchard; Elen Orson
- Music by: Mark Watters
- Production company: Walt Disney Television Animation (Note: Animation outsourced to Walt Disney Animation Australia and Walt Disney Animation Japan.)
- Distributed by: Buena Vista Home Video (Note: Distributed under the Walt Disney Home Video imprint.)
- Release date: May 20, 1994
- Running time: 69 minutes
- Country: United States
- Language: English
- Budget: $5 million

The Return of Jafar (retroactively titled Aladdin 2: The Return of Jafar on later releases) is a 1994 American direct-to-video animated musical fantasy film produced by Walt Disney Television Animation. It serves as a sequel to Disney's 1992 animated feature film Aladdin, and a pilot to the Aladdin animated television series, made by combining the planned first five episodes into a feature-length film.

Released by Buena Vista Home Video on May 20, 1994, in North America, it was the second Disney animated feature film sequel, after The Rescuers Down Under (1990), and the first Disney direct-to-video animated feature film. It also marked the first American direct-to-video animated feature film. Gilbert Gottfried, Jonathan Freeman, Scott Weinger, Frank Welker, Brad Kane and Linda Larkin reprise their roles from the first film, with Jason Alexander, Val Bettin, Liz Callaway, and Dan Castellaneta joining the cast.

The film received mostly negative reviews but sold 15 million VHS tapes, grossing more than $300 million (equivalent to $651,661,428 in 2025) on a budget of approximately $5 million (equivalent to $10,861,024 in 2025), making it one of the United States' best-selling films on home video.

== Plot ==
Almost a year following Jafar's defeat, (Note: As depicted in Aladdin (1992).) Aladdin and Abu have settled into the Palace of Agrabah with Princess Jasmine and her father, the Sultan. Still yearning for adventures, Aladdin foils a criminal group led by the dimwitted Abis Mal and returns their stolen loot to the citizens of Agrabah. Meanwhile, in the desert, Iago escapes from Jafar's lamp. Tired of Jafar's abuse, Iago refuses Jafar's demands to free him, and drops the lamp into a well.

Iago flies to Agrabah, planning to return to the Palace by befriending Aladdin. During his first interaction with Aladdin and Abu, the three are attacked by Abis Mal and his henchmen, and Iago inadvertently saves Aladdin's life. In gratitude, Aladdin keeps Iago on the palace grounds, promising to speak with the Sultan on Iago's behalf. Abis Mal later finds Jafar's lamp in the well and frees him. Hindered by his incompetent new master, Jafar tricks Abis Mal into wasting his first two wishes, then enlists his help in taking revenge on Aladdin. Abis Mal agrees, also desiring revenge on Aladdin.

Meanwhile, Genie returns to the palace after traveling the world for one year. Since gaining his freedom, he has retained some of his genie magic, but is much less powerful than he was back when he could grant wishes. At the evening banquet, the Sultan announces Aladdin as the new Royal Vizier. Rajah discovers Iago in the garden and chases him into the banquet. Aladdin asks the Sultan to pardon Iago, but Jasmine is dismayed that Aladdin never confided in her. Genie and Iago help them reconcile, but the Sultan, though remaining suspicious, temporarily pardons Iago and instructs Aladdin to watch over him. However, Jafar infiltrates the palace and forces Iago to trick Aladdin and the Sultan into taking a trip to a waterfall.

During the trip, the Sultan finally forgives Aladdin and Iago, but Jafar, having transformed into a gang of sorcerer horsemen riding dragon-winged horses, ambushes them, sending Aladdin into the waterfall while taking the Sultan, Jasmine, Genie and Abu as prisoners. Aladdin eventually returns to Agrabah to warn Razoul but Jafar, posing as Jasmine, frames Aladdin for murdering the Sultan, and sentences him to death. Feeling guilty for his actions, Iago frees Genie, who saves Aladdin from execution by the palace guards. Jafar now controls Agrabah, but Aladdin is determined to stop him, and Genie reveals that the only way to kill Jafar and save Agrabah from his control is to destroy his lamp. Iago chooses to leave, but not before Aladdin thanks him for his help.

Jafar demands that Abis Mal free him from the lamp with his third wish, just as Aladdin and his friends confront them to obtain the lamp. Jafar, in his genie form, ambushes the group, knocks Genie unconscious and shatters Carpet. He splits open the Palace gardens, creating a pool of lava, and traps Aladdin on a sinking rock. Iago, having a change of heart, returns and grabs the lamp but is burned by Jafar, knocked unconscious and critically injured. With his remaining strength, Iago kicks the lamp into the lava, killing Jafar once and for all. With his death, Jafar's magic is undone, restoring the Palace gardens and Carpet. They mourn Iago but he regains consciousness and is forgiven, being allowed back into the Palace. Aladdin ultimately rejects the Sultan's offer to become his vizier, having decided he wants to see the world with Jasmine instead.

In a post-credits scene, Abis Mal laments that he will never get his third wish.

== Voice cast ==
- Gilbert Gottfried as Iago
- Jason Alexander as Abis Mal
- Jonathan Freeman as Jafar
- Scott Weinger as Aladdin
  - Brad Kane as Aladdin (singing voice)
- Linda Larkin as Jasmine
  - Liz Callaway as Jasmine (singing voice) and replaces Lea Salonga from the first film.
- Dan Castellaneta as Genie, Omar, and Thief
- Frank Welker as Abu, Rajah, Fazal, Egg Vendor, and Thief
- Val Bettin as the Sultan
- Jim Cummings as Razoul and Thief

Additional voices are provided by Jeff Bennett and B. J. Ward.

== Production ==
Following the success of The Little Mermaid, Walt Disney Television Animation subsequently produced an animated television series of the same name that aired on CBS. At the same time, The Disney Afternoon had become a success with television series, such as DuckTales and Chip 'n Dale: Rescue Rangers airing in a syndicated two-hour time slot. Before the theatrical release of Aladdin, Disney commissioned Tad Stones and Alan Zaslove to produce a direct-to-television project that would shepherd its transition from the film into a television series.

While conceiving the sequel, Stones became fascinated with the character Iago, stating, "I said, 'I want the parrot in there,' but he was trapped in the lamp [at the end of the Aladdin movie], so we came up with a story of how he got out and ended up with Aladdin." As was common with half-hour animated television series at the time, Disney planned to begin the series with an hour-long television special, but Stones suggested that the film should instead be released on home video. The idea was initially met with resistance from Disney Feature Animation president Peter Schneider and Disney CEO Michael Eisner, who felt it would cheapen Disney's brand. Ultimately, layout designer Paul Felix conceived the film's opening with the gang of thieves entering a cave, which was later animated at Disney Animation Australia. Impressed with the animation dailies, Disney chairman Jeffrey Katzenberg allowed for the first half to be animated in Australia, while the climax was animated in Japan.

Due to a well-publicized, bitter falling-out over the use of his voice in the marketing campaign for Aladdin, Robin Williams refused to reprise the role of the Genie. He was replaced by Dan Castellaneta. Stones also claimed that Williams participated in selecting Castellaneta to voice the Genie. It was also the first Aladdin full-length production without the original voice of the Sultan, Douglas Seale. He was replaced by Val Bettin, who had previously worked with Disney on The Great Mouse Detective, and who would reprise his role in the franchise's animated series and Aladdin and the King of Thieves, the latter of which also included the return on Robin Williams.

== Songs ==
Songs in the film include:

- "Arabian Nights" performed by Brian Hannan
- "I'm Looking Out for Me" performed by Gilbert Gottfried
- "Nothing in the World (Quite Like a Friend)" performed by Dan Castellaneta, Brad Kane & Liz Callaway
- "Forget About Love" performed by Gilbert Gottfried, Brad Kane & Liz Callaway
- "You're Only Second Rate" performed by Jonathan Freeman

== Release ==
Instead of the film receiving a theatrical release, Steve Feldstein, director of public relations for Disney's home video division, stated that the decision to release The Return of Jafar on home video was due to time constraints, claiming that "to put the film in the theatrical pipeline would have taken up to five years", but releasing it on home video would take "less than two years". In addition, Feldstein confirmed that financing was also a consideration because producing a direct-to-video feature would be "less costly to make than Aladdin". Likewise, due to an expanding video market, Disney claimed that demand from theatrical and video audiences for Aladdin and other characters was another reason for a speedy follow-up.

== Home media ==
The Return of Jafar was first released on VHS and LaserDisc in the United States and Canada on May 20, 1994, being the first installment of the direct-to-video sequels. In its first two days, it sold more than 1.5 million VHS copies; more than 4.6 million VHS copies were sold in less than a week. In the United States, more than ten million copies were sold, ranking among the top 15 top-selling videos of all time (at the time), earning $150 million in profits. The film eventually sold 15 million units, and grossed approximately $300 million worldwide. The sequel's success removed what the Los Angeles Times described as "the low-quality stigma" from direct-to-video, and caused Disney, Universal Pictures, and other studios to release more direct-to-video films. For its original direct-to-video release, The Return of Jafar was accompanied with a promotional campaign including trailers and inserts in over a million VHS copies of The Fox and the Hound (1981), and mail-in rebate coupons for Mattel toys and products from Pillsbury (in the United States only) packaged inside every copy of the VHS cassette of the film.

On July 14, 1998, the film along with A Goofy Movie and The Three Caballeros was promoted with a $2 instant savings coupon from Walt Disney Home Video, good toward the purchase of The Spirit of Mickey (released on that same day) and any one of these three videos.

Originally released on VHS that year, The Return of Jafar was reissued on Special edition DVD and VHS (with "Aladdin:" added to the title) on January 18, 2005, the same day as its direct sequel, Aladdin and the King of Thieves, also received a re-release, with a digitally restored picture and remastered sound. The Special Edition DVD, along with the two other films in the series, were placed on moratorium (placed into the Disney Vault) on January 31, 2008, in the United States, and on February 4, 2008, in the United Kingdom. The Return of Jafar, along with Aladdin and the King of Thieves was released on Blu-ray/DVD/Digital HD Combo Pack on January 5, 2016, as a Disney Movie Club exclusive in North America.

== Reception ==
On the review aggregator website Rotten Tomatoes, the film has an overall approval rating of 33%, based on 12 reviews collected, with a weighted average score of 4.3/10.

David Nusair of Reelfilm.com summed up most of the negative feelings that contributed to this rating:

Notable as the first direct-to-video Disney sequel, The Return of Jafar follows Aladdin (Scott Weinger) as he attempts to once again foil Jafar's (Jonathan Freeman) villainous plot to take over Agrabah. And despite the fact that he was freed from his lamp at the end of the first film, the genie (now voiced by Dan Castellaneta) is back and wackier than ever. It's clear right from the outset that Disney put very little effort into the production of The Return of Jafar, particularly in the realm of animation. The film has all the style and fluidity of a Saturday morning cartoon, while various songs are bland and forgettable. The repetitive storyline doesn't do the movie any favors, and even at a running time of 69-minutes, doldrums set in almost immediately. Castellaneta does the best he can with the material, but generally comes up short (particularly when compared with Robin Williams's manic performance from the original). The Return of Jafar is a thoroughly needless sequel that may keep small children engaged, but is bound to come off as nothing less than a huge disappointment for fans of the original.

Despite the mostly negative reception, on the television program Siskel & Ebert, the film received a "two thumbs up" from Gene Siskel and Roger Ebert.

Writing for Entertainment Weekly, Steve Daly graded the sequel a "C−", criticizing it as a "knockoff" that "carries the Disney label and costs about as much as a tape of Aladdin, but it's clear from the first jerky frame that the same time, care, and creativity didn't go into it".

== Adaptations ==
=== Comic ===
When Disney was publishing its own comics in the mid-1990s, it produced a two-issue Aladdin comic presenting an alternate version of The Return of Jafar. It was titled The Return of Aladdin. The comic is introduced by the Peddler from the first film.

The story starts off showing that Aladdin has been particularly bored of palace life. Meanwhile, Jafar has escaped the Cave of Wonders. Iago is given the task of finding the right master for Jafar to manipulate into setting him free. Their search seems hopeless-- everyone either spends all three wishes on themselves or doesn't understand how to free Jafar. They find someone to use the lamp; she is known as Isabella, a master magician. Isabella is similar in appearance to Jafar (although his clothing is green). His first wish is to return to Agrabah Palace (as he performed entertainment for the Sultan in the first film). His second wish is for an army of soldiers to pursue Aladdin and Jasmine when they catch on to Jafar's presence. He is persuaded to use his third wish to trap Jafar and Iago in the lamp again, sending them back to the cave. Due to persuasion by the Genie, the Sultan hires Isabella for a permanent entertainment job at the Palace. The end of the story shows the Peddler having a black lamp similar to Jafar's, but he claims it to be worthless.

=== Video game ===
The plot of the film is loosely used in Agrabah, one of the worlds in Kingdom Hearts II, and the Peddler appears from the first film. As in the film, Iago escapes from Jafar and does his best to respect Aladdin, Jasmine, Sora, Donald Duck, and Goofy, although Jafar cons him into aiding him in his revenge, almost damaging Iago's friendship with Aladdin and Sora, but he redeems himself after taking a blow for Aladdin that almost claims his life. The Peddler, at the beginning, comes across Jafar's lamp, but sells it to Aladdin, Sora, Donald and Goofy for a rare artifact in the Cave of Wonders. Despite Aladdin sealing the lamp in the Palace dungeon, the Peddler breaks into the dungeon and frees Jafar, unleashing his fury on Agrabah until he is defeated by Sora and company. The Peddler's fate is left ambiguous.

Furthermore, there is a mild allusion to the Agrabah boss battle in Kingdom Hearts. Sora must fight Jafar in Genie form, surrounded by a lava pit with raising and lowering levels, while Iago flies above with Jafar's lamp. Only striking the lamp has any effect on Jafar's health. This fight also takes place in the second game, Kingdom Hearts: Chain of Memories, and its PlayStation 2 remake. In both versions of Chain of Memories, the boss fight is due to the majority of the game being illusions created from Sora's memories. A second playable character, Riku, also fights Jafar in his storyline. The battle is again visited in Kingdom Hearts Coded.

== Follow-ups ==
The film was followed by a television series titled Aladdin, which served as the overall third installment, and another direct-to-video sequel, Aladdin and the King of Thieves, which was released in 1996. The franchise was later revisited in "Hercules and the Arabian Night", a crossover episode with the Hercules animated series, and in the segment More Than a Peacock Princess from Disney Princess Enchanted Tales: Follow Your Dreams.
