= Genie (Disney) =

Character from Disney's Aladdin

- Aladdin character
- Genie, as he appears in the Aladdin (1992) and related media
- First appearance: Aladdin (1992)
- Created by: Ron Clements; John Musker
- Voiced by: Robin Williams (1992–1996, 2023 [archival]); Dan Castellaneta (1994–2005); Jim Meskimen (2008–present)
- Portrayed by: James M. Iglehart (2011 musical); Will Smith (2019 film)

In-universe information
- Aliases: Genie of the Lamp; Blue Genie
- Species: Jinn; Human (2019 film; form)

The Genie is a fictional character who appeared in Walt Disney Pictures' animated film Aladdin (1992), later appearing in other media of the Aladdin franchise as one of its main characters, as well as throughout other Disney media; he was based on popular culture depictions of genies or djinns (in particular One Thousand and One Nights). He was voiced by Robin Williams in the first film, on whom the character's mannerisms were based. Following a contract dispute between Williams and Disney, Dan Castellaneta voiced the Genie in the direct-to-video feature The Return of Jafar, as well as the television series. Williams reprised the role for the final film installment Aladdin and the King of Thieves, and the character's own educational mini-series Great Minds Think for Themselves.

Dan Castellaneta voiced the Genie in Aladdin in Nasira's Revenge and later the Kingdom Hearts series for both Kingdom Hearts and Kingdom Hearts II (with archived audio used in other Kingdom Hearts games). Jim Meskimen took over the role in Disney Think Fast (2008) and Kinect: Disneyland Adventures (2011) and has continued to voice the character since then. Will Smith plays a live-action version of the character in the 2019 live-action adaptation of the original 1992 film.

== Involvement ==
As well as largely driving the plot in the first film, the Genie serves as comic relief in each of his appearances. He is shown to have unlimited shapeshifting abilities, which allow for many and varied sight gags; however, he is unable to kill anyone, make anyone fall in love, fully revive the dead (Note: In the 1992 film, the Genie insinuates that he has previously attempted to revive the dead but has only been able to create zombies.), or provide additional wishes. The Genie's supernatural abilities permit him to break the fourth wall, as well as parody real-life people and popular culture completely beyond the boundaries of his native universe. For instance, during production of Aladdin Williams would improvise various impersonations at will, and his animator Eric Goldberg would choose the ones that would be translated into the film. One of those was an imitation of Pinocchio's nose growing, which made the Genie's head turn into Pinocchio's. Composer Alan Menken and lyricist Howard Ashman had conceived the Genie as "a hip Harlem jazz singer, like Fats Waller or Cab Calloway." Thus Menken was afraid Williams would not be able to display the required singing capabilities, only changing his mind after seeing Williams perform "Friend Like Me" and "Prince Ali" at his Los Angeles home.

== Appearances ==
=== Film ===
==== Aladdin (1992) ====
The Genie first appears in Aladdin, where he is released from a magical oil lamp, which formed the phrase "genie in a lamp" or "genie in a bottle", which coined the term by the titular character in the collapsed Cave of Wonders. After he explains that he can grant three wishes (but cannot do things like murder, romance, complete revival, or provide additional wishes), Aladdin, knowing that Genie would only grant his wish to get out of the cave if he used one of his wishes, dupes him into freeing Aladdin and Abu from the cave without using a wish. At a faraway oasis, the Genie is shocked when he finds that Aladdin didn't use his first wish to get out of the cave and reluctantly agrees to let Aladdin's first wish to be spared. Asked by Aladdin what he would wish for, Genie admits he would wish for freedom, since genies must follow the orders of a master — in this case, Aladdin. He accepts Aladdin's promise to use the third wish to set him free, then grants Aladdin his first wish: making him a prince so he can legally court Princess Jasmine. Genie goes into hiding after leading a parade to the Agrabah palace. Genie is released again when Aladdin is shackled, gagged, and thrown off a cliff into the ocean by Jafar's guards. He rescues Aladdin as the second wish upon liberally interpreting Aladdin's nodding head. Later, Genie has an argument with Aladdin when he starts to think he may have to break his promise to use the third wish, out of fear of what will happen should someone find out he is not royalty.

Iago the parrot soon steals Genie's lamp and delivers it to Jafar (who sought to use Genie for his own gain), making Jafar Genie's new master. This made Aladdin regret not freeing Genie when he had the chance. The Genie has no choice but to grant Jafar's first and second wish to become Sultan of Agrabah and the world's most powerful sorcerer. He is then made a slave with no purpose in life but to entertain the cruel Jafar by torturing the former Sultan. When Jafar wishes for Jasmine to fall in love with him, Genie cannot grant this wishes, but Jafar angrily demands that he do it anyway. During the final fight between Aladdin and Jafar, the Genie is forced to grant Jafar's final wish to become an all-powerful genie when Aladdin convinces him to do so, much to Genie's reluctance. However, as they both know, the fulfillment of this wish had a catch, causing Jafar to be imprisoned in a lamp of his own, which a now-more-relieved Genie hurls into the desert, freeing Agrabah from his tyranny. While the Genie is willing to sacrifice his freedom in order to allow Aladdin to be with Princess Jasmine, Aladdin decides to live up to his original promise and uses his final wish to free the Genie from his lamp's power, much to the latter's surprise and happiness; this causes Genie's shackles to fall off in the process. Aladdin still gets to marry Princess Jasmine, as the Sultan is touched by the young couple's love for one another, so he changes the law so the princess can marry whomever she pleases. The freed Genie bids a tearful goodbye to Aladdin and leaves Agrabah to explore the world.

Also, at the beginning of the film appears a Peddler who narrates to the audience the story about the magic lamp, the character being confirmed by the film's directors to be the same Genie in disguise (the Peddler's singing voice was provided by Bruce Adler).

==== The Return of Jafar (1994) ====
In the Aladdin sequel The Return of Jafar, the Genie returns to Agrabah following his one-year trip around the world, deciding it isn't all that great without his friends to share it with. His powers are lessened by his own admission, as a freed genie is less powerful than one bound to a lamp, though he still retains several of his abilities, most notably shapeshifting, flight, and conjuration, and continues to wear his golden shackles despite having been freed. On the night of his return, after Jasmine and Aladdin have a fight over Aladdin keeping Iago's presence secret from her, the Genie convinces Iago to help him get the couple to reconcile. Later in the film, when Aladdin, Iago and the Sultan go on an outing without him, the Genie and Abu have a picnic for themselves but are confronted by Jafar. Despite a brave fight against him, the Genie is outmatched and both he and Abu are imprisoned. Eventually, they are joined by the Sultan, Princess Jasmine and the Carpet who were all captured by Jafar. After being freed from imprisonment by a morally-confused Iago, Genie saves Aladdin from being executed by the palace guards, which Jafar had orchestrated by framing Aladdin for murdering the Sultan. After the heroes regroup, the Genie reveals destroying Jafar's lamp is the only way they can destroy him. Their plan to discreetly take the lamp does not go unnoticed and they are drawn into combat. Genie assists the heroes several times during this battle, by catching a falling Aladdin and by shape-shifting into him in an attempt to distract Jafar while Aladdin grabs his lamp. However, this too fails as Jafar is able to prevent Aladdin from seizing the lamp, and uses his powers to split the land open over a sea of magma. After the reformed Iago is shot down trying to hand over the lamp to Aladdin, the parrot bravely kicks the lamp into the lava and thus destroys Jafar once and for all. The Genie saves Jasmine from a dangerous situation as the ground is closing back up by stretching himself so they can get out in time. When he finds out that Iago survived the battle, he celebrates by turning into a firework.

==== Aladdin and the King of Thieves (1996) ====
In Aladdin and the King of Thieves, the Genie plays a considerably smaller role. Unlike the first and second films, he does not have an active role in the main plot, resulting in less screen time. Nevertheless, he still acts as Aladdin's best friend and moral support. He also appears to be just as powerful as he was in the first film, as he has no problem with anything he tries, something that implies that his reduction of power could have been merely temporary.

==== Aladdin (2019 remake) ====
Genie (portrayed by Will Smith) in the 2019 live-action adaptation.

In the 2019 live-action adaptation of Aladdin, the Genie is portrayed by Will Smith, with his appearance alternating between his classic blue-skin and a human form as a disguise to blend in. This version is significantly less wacky than in the original film, having a more relaxed and sarcastic personality. In the remake, wishes must be done with more specific words or else the Genie could give something different from what was intended, something Aladdin later uses to trick Jafar into becoming a genie. Additionally, in this version, the Genie states clearly that his power comes from the lamp as well as himself, with the result that he becomes human when freed from the lamp. Genie is also portrayed as forming a romance with Jasmine's handmaiden Dalia, to the point that he asks her to join him in travelling the world after he is freed from the lamp. The start of the film features a plot twist featuring a human Genie telling Aladdin's story to his and Dalia's children, a reference to a deleted concept from the original film in which the Peddler from the start would reveal himself as the Genie.

==== Other films ====
The Genie appears in the two direct-to-video films based on the series House of Mouse: in Mickey's Magical Christmas: Snowed in at the House of Mouse (2001), he is present among the characters surprised to not be able to leave the club because of the snow blizzard; he is later seen setting along with Abu and Jafar while they enjoy the Christmas celebration, and in the end as part of the characters who sing the musical number "The Best Christmas of All"; in Mickey's House of Villains (2002), he is part of the characters that are locked up by the Card Soldiers in the club's kitchen.

He can be seen at the end of The Lion King 1½ (2004) among the Disney characters who meet to see the movie again.

Genie is one of the several Walt Disney Animation Studios characters that appears in the short film Once Upon a Studio (2023), with his voice being reused from archival recordings of Robin Williams.

=== Television ===
==== Aladdin: The Series ====
The Genie has a major supporting role in the Aladdin television series (1994–1995), although his contributions are sometimes limited; as the show takes place directly after The Return of Jafar, the once-omnipotent Genie is now reduced to "semi-phenomenal, nearly-cosmic powers", which renders him incapable of undoing some of the spells he is confronted with, and lacks some degree of his old intellect. A particular example of this is the episode "Love at First Sprite", when a group of sprites lift the palace into the air and then drop it back to the ground; Genie explicitly references how he lifted the palace in the past, but is unable to repeat the feat on this occasion, requiring Carpet to trick the sprites into lowering the palace to safety. However, Genie is still an indispensable member of Aladdin's team: there were many, many occasions in the TV series where the Genie's magic was crucial for the heroes to win, and the situation would have been hopeless without him. In the episode "The Secret of Dagger Rock", the Genie reveals he still wears his golden shackles despite having been freed from his lamp because he is "a slave to fashion".

==== Other TV appearances ====
In addition, Williams himself returned to the role from 1997 to 2002 for an educational spot series in ABC's One Saturday Morning programming block, called Great Minds Think 4 Themselves, where the Genie tells the stories of various historical figures who defied the assumptions and prejudices of their times to produce great achievements.

The Genie also is a guest in House of Mouse (2001–2003), having cameo appearances among the audience of the titular club, often sitting with other Aladdin characters.

=== Video games ===
==== Kingdom Hearts series ====
The Genie appears in some of the installments of the Kingdom Hearts series of video games (voiced by Dan Castellaneta and Jim Meskimen in the English dub, while Kōichi Yamadera voices him in the Japanese version).

Genie in his "Valor Form" in Kingdom Hearts II.

His role in the first Kingdom Hearts (2002) is mostly the same as in the film as his lamp is found by Aladdin. The general difference is that all of Aladdin's wishes are wasted to get him out of trouble: the first wish was spent on getting rid of Heartless attacking and the second one is to rescue Princess Jasmine from Jafar. Eventually, Iago steals the Genie's lamp, forcing him to show Jafar the keyhole of Agrabah and assist him in fighting Sora and his friends. After Jafar is defeated, Aladdin wishes the Genie free from his lamp. He then becomes a summon for Sora.

In Kingdom Hearts: Chain of Memories (2004), the Genie appears as a part of Sora's memories.

The Genie has much less screen time and much less to do with the plot in Kingdom Hearts II (2005). Like in The Return of Jafar, he goes off to see the world along with Carpet. He misses most of the action, but arrives near the end of Sora's first visit and disturbs Pete when he is about to free Jafar from his lamp. Also, the Genie once again becomes a summon partner for Sora, but his newest feature is copying Sora's Drive forms and wielding his own copy of the Keyblade (excluding the Limit Form in Kingdom Hearts II Final Mix).

A data version of him appears in Kingdom Hearts Coded (2008).

The Genie also appears briefly in Kingdom Hearts 358/2 Days (2009), interacting with Roxas and Xion as they make their way back to Agrabah.

==== Other video games ====
Aladdin is a 1993 platform game based on the 1992 film of the same name developed by Virgin Games. If the player collects one or more Genie Tokens and clears a level, the player will be taken to the "Genie's Bonus Machine", a luck-based minigame in which pressing a button rewards the player with a random prize.

Aladdin Activity Center is a PC game that was released in November 1994. A collection of minigames hosted by the Genie. The Genie presents the games directly to the player and helps them learning the controls and giving useful tips for completing them.

Genie appears as a supporting character in Disney's Aladdin in Nasira's Revenge (2000).

He also serves as the host of Disney Think Fast (2008), introducing the game's players and rounds, as well as ranking the players based on the number of points (and commenting on things such as all players getting an answer wrong, and stopping to take very brief breaks).

He is one of the meet-and-greet characters that appear in Kinect: Disneyland Adventures (2011).

Genie appears as a playable character to unlock for a limited time in the video game Disney Magic Kingdoms (2017).

Genie appears as a playable character in the mobile game Disney Heroes Battle Mode.

An alternate version of Genie appears as a playable character in the video game Disney Mirrorverse (2022).

He is an unlockable racer in Disney Speedstorm (2023).

=== Theme parks ===
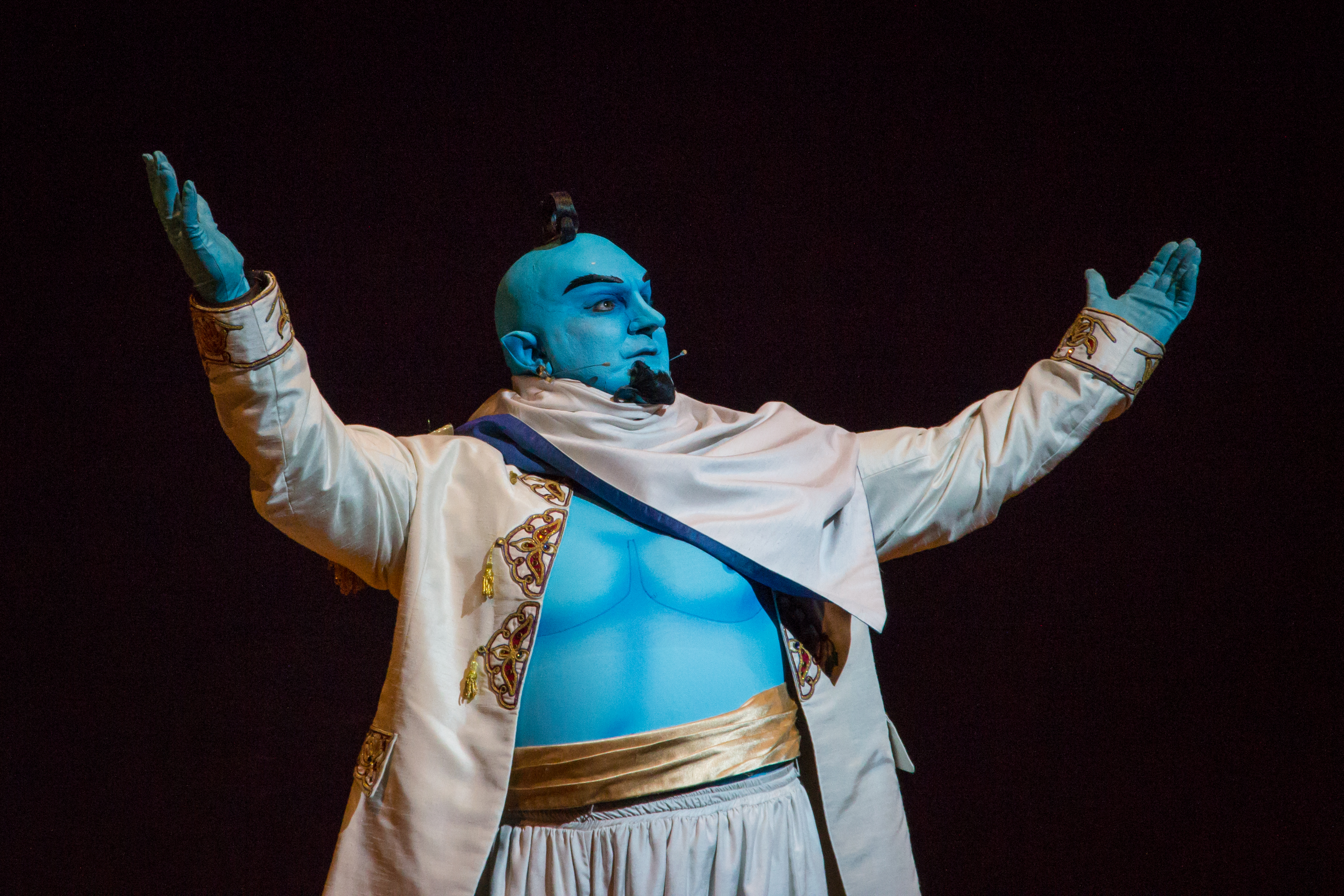
Genie (played by Nick Santa Maria) in Disney's Aladdin: A Musical Spectacular.

Genie is a meet-and-greet character at Disney Parks. On August 18, 2021, Disney announced the Genie would be the mascot of a new paid skip-the-line service called Genie+, which was implemented later that fall. It has since been replaced in 2024 with Lightning Lane Multi Pass.

=== Aladdin (musical) ===
Genie plays a notable role in the Broadway stage adaptation of the 1992 film, portrayed by James Monroe Iglehart. In this version, Genie replaces the Peddler at the beginning of the story singing "Arabian Nights".

Since the show's debut, Iglehart's portrayal of Genie has received critical acclaim from audiences and critics, which includes winning a Tony Award for Best Featured Actor in a Musical.

=== Parodies ===
The Genie (voiced by Dan Castellaneta) appears in The Simpsons episode "MyPods and Boomsticks" (2008) during a dream of Homer (a character also voiced by Castellaneta), where he uses his magic to transform Springfield into an Islamic republic.

The Genie, also known as the Djinn (portrayed by Nick Cage), appears in the parody musical Twisted (2013). He is portrayed as a frivolous prankster whose dialogue consists completely of non sequitur quotes from film and television, greatly amusing everyone but Ja'far.

The Genie (voiced by Isaiah Mustafa) has an appearance in the Robot Chicken episode "May Cause Immaculate Conception" (2021), where one of the bell-ringers that he made appear during the Agrabah parade asks him for food for the animals that were part of the parade.

== Reception ==
Williams received critical acclaim for his performance as the Genie. Reception to Williams' involvement influenced tributes following his 2014 death, with critics considering the Genie to have been his most memorable performance. Aladdin composer Alan Menken lamented Williams' passing, saying he was "a brilliant, adorable, hilarious, compassionate, vulnerable manifestation of the human condition."
