= Aladdin and the King of Thieves =

1996 animated film

- Home video release poster
- Directed by: Tad Stones
- Screenplay by: Mark McCorkle; Robert Schooley
- Produced by: Tad Stones
- Starring: Scott Weinger; John Rhys-Davies; Gilbert Gottfried; Jerry Orbach; Linda Larkin; Val Bettin; Robin Williams; Frank Welker
- Edited by: Elen Orson
- Music by: Mark Watters; Carl Johnson
- Production company: Walt Disney Television Animation
- Distributed by: Buena Vista Home Video (Note: Distributed under the Walt Disney Home Video imprint.)
- Release date: August 13, 1996
- Running time: 81 minutes
- Country: United States
- Language: English

Aladdin and the King of Thieves (also known as Aladdin 3: The King of Thieves, alternatively titled Aladdin and the 40 Thieves in some countries) is a 1996 American direct-to-video animated musical fantasy adventure film produced by Disney Television Animation and Disneytoon Studios. It is the second sequel to Disney's 1992 animated feature film Aladdin. It serves as a sequel to The Return of Jafar, and a finale to the television series.

The film takes place after the end of third season of the television series and is inspired by the tale Ali Baba and the Forty Thieves from One Thousand and One Nights, replacing Ali Baba with Aladdin. For the first time since the original Aladdin, the film has a completely new soundtrack instead of the rearranged music from the original film for The Return of Jafar and the series. This film also marks the return of Robin Williams, reprising his role as Genie (Dan Castellaneta voices him in the second film, the series, and other media).

Aladdin and the King of Thieves was released by Buena Vista Home Video on August 13, 1996. Although this film serves as the series finale of the television series, the characters also appear in a 1999 crossover episode of the animated series Hercules, titled "Hercules and the Arabian Night", as well as the segment More Than a Peacock Princess from the 2007 direct-to-video film Disney Princess Enchanted Tales: Follow Your Dreams, both of which occur after this plot. The film received mixed-to-negative reviews, although it was deemed an improvement over The Return of Jafar.

== Plot ==
At Agrabah, Aladdin and Princess Jasmine prepare to be married. During the ceremony, the legendary Forty Thieves appear, trying to steal a magical staff. After driving them off, Aladdin and his friends discover the Oracle, a woman within the staff who can answer a single question about absolutely anything to any individual. She hints to Aladdin that all of his questions can be answered by his father, who is still alive, much to everyone's surprise. According to her, Aladdin's father is with the Forty Thieves, "trapped within their world".

Aladdin, with Abu, Iago and Carpet, tracks the thieves and stows away into their hideout, Mount Sesame, where he discovers that his father Cassim is actually the King of Thieves, their leader. The two have a heartfelt reunion before Cassim's chief subordinate Sa'luk tries to punish Aladdin for infiltrating their hideout. Cassim, however, suggests that Aladdin instead face the initiation ritual known as "the Challenge": if he defeats another one of the Forty Thieves, he can take their place. Aladdin defeats Sa'luk and is welcomed into the band.

Cassim reveals that he left his family in search for the Hand of King Midas, an artifact that can transform anything it touches to gold. Cassim believed that, with it, he could return to his family and rescue them from poverty. With the staff, he could question the Oracle for the precise whereabouts of the artifact. Aladdin convinces Cassim to return with him to Agrabah to live an honest life. Initially hesitant, Cassim agrees after realizing that the wedding can be his last chance to get the Oracle.

After spending quality time with Aladdin and his friends, Cassim decides to go forward with his original scheme, with Iago as his new henchman. Meanwhile, Sa'luk travels to Agrabah and sells out his fellow thieves by telling Razoul, the Captain of Agrabah's Royal Guard, the password to their hideout in exchange for immunity from prosecution. After all but seven of the thieves are captured, Razoul learns that Aladdin is one of the forty, and his father Cassim is the King himself. Cassim and Iago try to steal the Oracle but are captured and detained after the Sultan learns of Cassim's relationship with the Forty Thieves. Aladdin rescues Cassim and Iago but refuses to flee with them, instead confronting Cassim for having left his family. He returns to the palace to take responsibility for his actions. As the Sultan is about to punish Aladdin, Genie and Jasmine come to his defense, stating that all he wanted was to give his father a second chance. Understanding this, the Sultan accepts Aladdin's apology and resumes preparations for the wedding.

Returning to Mount Sesame, Cassim and Iago are captured by Sa'luk and the remaining seven thieves (Sa'luk deceived them into believing Cassim had betrayed them to Razoul), who force them to use the Oracle to locate the Hand of Midas. The Oracle directs them to the Vanishing Isle, a marble fortress built on the back of an enormous turtle that periodically dives to the bottom of the ocean, where the Hand is hidden. Iago escapes and goes to lead Aladdin, Jasmine, Abu, Genie and Carpet to Cassim.

Aladdin frees and reconciles with his father. Working together, they retrieve the Hand just as the turtle is starting to submerge. However, they are ambushed by Sa'luk, who takes Aladdin hostage, demanding that Cassim surrender the Hand. Cassim throws the Hand to Sa'luk, who grabs it by the wrong end and is transformed into a lifeless gold statue. Realizing that his obsession has brought only trouble and that his son is actually his ultimate treasure, Cassim throws the Hand into the ship with the remaining thieves aboard, turning it into gold and sinking it.

That night, Aladdin and Jasmine are married with all their friends and family present. Cassim watches this from afar because he is still a wanted man, and Iago decides to join him on his travels. Aladdin and Cassim wave goodbye to each other as the former kisses Jasmine while the latter rides off into the moonlight with Iago.

== Voice cast ==
- Scott Weinger as Aladdin
  - Brad Kane as Aladdin (singing voice)
- Linda Larkin as Princess Jasmine
  - Liz Callaway as Princess Jasmine (singing voice) Callaway replaces Lea Salonga who did Jasmine’s singing voice in Aladdin
- John Rhys-Davies as Cassim
  - Merwin Foard as Cassim (singing voice)
- Jerry Orbach as Sa'Luk
- Gilbert Gottfried as Iago
- Frank Welker as:
  - Abu
  - Fazal
  - Rajah
- Robin Williams as Genie
- Val Bettin as The Sultan
- Jim Cummings as Razoul
- CCH Pounder as The Oracle
- Bruce Adler as The Peddler

Additional voices are provided by Jeff Bennett, Corey Burton, Jess Harnell, Clyde Kusatsu and Rob Paulsen.

== Production ==
Following the success of The Return of Jafar, Disney announced in January 1995 that a third film was in production. In June, it was scheduled for a home-video release in 1996. In September 1995, it was confirmed that Robin Williams would reprise the role of the Genie reportedly for a $1 million salary, after he received an apology from Joe Roth for Disney breaching an agreement not to use his voice to merchandise products inspired by Aladdin. With Williams on board, all recordings and animation footage of Dan Castellaneta as the Genie was scrapped, and all of the Genie's scenes were rewritten to fit Williams' comedic style.

=== Songs ===
No.	Title	Performer(s)	Length
1.	"There's a Party Here in Agrabah"	Robin Williams, Merwin Foard & Gilbert Gottfried
2.	"Out of Thin Air"	Liz Callaway & Brad Kane
3.	"Welcome to the Forty Thieves"	Merwin Foard & Chorus
4.	"Father and Son"	Robin Williams
5.	"Are You In or Out?"	Jerry Orbach & Chorus
6.	"Arabian Nights (Reprise)"	Bruce Adler

=== Adaptation ===
Two comic adaptations of the movie were on sale in September 1996.

- The first is in Marvel Comics' Disney Comic Hits, #13.
- The second is in Disney Adventures, Volume 6, #12.

== Release ==
On its release, the film was accompanied by a marketing campaign at more than $70 million, with commercial tie-ins with McDonald's and General Mills.

=== Home media ===
At the time of its release, The King of Thieves was reportedly outselling The Return of Jafar, but Disney declined to disclose actual sales figures for the release. In 1996, the film sold 10.3 million units in the United States, generating at least $130,000,000 (equivalent to $267,000,000 in 2025) in sales revenue. It was the sixth-best-selling film video release in the United States during 1996.

On January 18, 2005, the film was re-released as a special edition DVD and VHS (the same day as The Return of Jafar), with the DVD version receiving a digitally-restored picture, remastered sound, two interactive games, and a behind-the-scenes bonus feature. It also dropped the "Starring Robin Williams" from its title on the cover. However, the film is matted into a 1.78:1 widescreen ratio (an aspect ratio that, at the time, Disney had used for television animation). The movie returned to the Disney Vault with the two other films in the series in January 2008. Aladdin and the King of Thieves and The Return of Jafar were released in North America on a Blu-ray/DVD/Digital HD combo pack on January 5, 2016, as a Disney Movie Club exclusive (with both films matted into a 1.78:1 widescreen ratio).

== Reception ==
Based on 12 reviews collected by Rotten Tomatoes, the film has received a 33% approval rating, with an average score of 4.84/10.

Caryn James of The New York Times praised the sequel as "far better than The Return of Jafar", and acknowledged that "the video has some other weak spots, but these hardly matter when Aladdin and the King of Thieves is so brimming with comic invention and adventure".

Scott Blakey of the Chicago Tribune wrote that the story grows tedious after an hour, and recommended The Fool and the Flying Ship instead.

The Washington Post stated that the "art of animation is strictly Saturday morning quality again (jobbed out to Disney's overseas JV team), and the score is a long step backward from the original, meaning the movie lacks the lingering resonance and memorable visual moments of Disney's big-budget affairs. Essentially, the movie is comparable to other reputable animated titles like The Swan Princess and Balto – pretty good, but not exactly Disney."

== Awards and nominations ==
Year	Nominee / work	Award	Result
1997	Aladdin and the King of Thieves	Annie Award for Best Home Video Production	Won
1997	Mark Watters, Carl Johnson	Annie Award for Best Individual Achievement: Music in a Feature/Home Video Production	Nominated
1997	Aladdin and the King of Thieves	World Animation Celebration Award for Best Direct to Home Video Production	Won

== Cancelled fourth film ==
In 2005, screenwriter Robert Reece pitched a fourth Aladdin film to DisneyToon executives, but it never came to fruition.
