= Douglas Seale =

British actor (1913–1999)

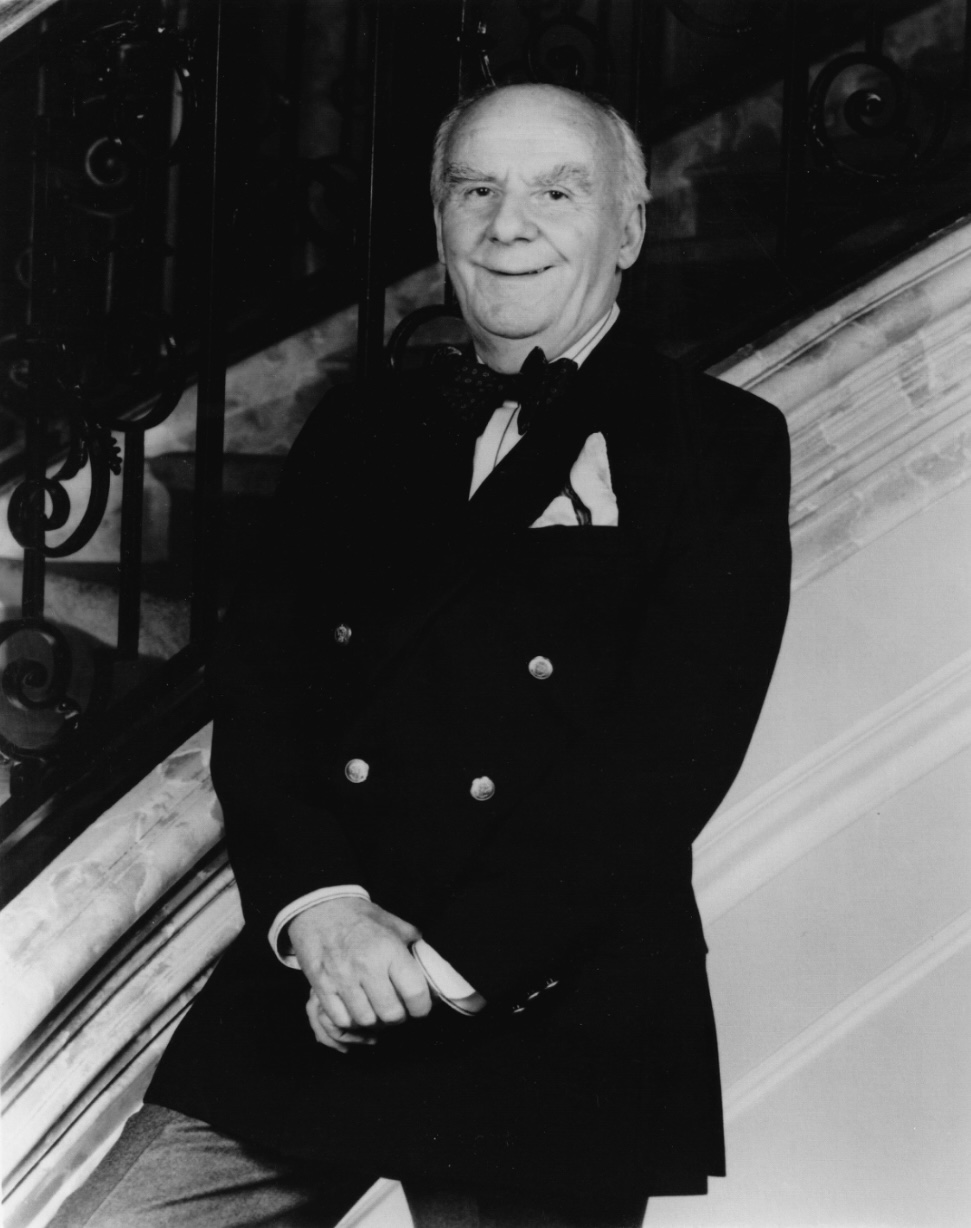
- Seale in Rags to Riches, 1987
- Born: 28 October 1913; London, England
- Died: 13 June 1999 (aged 85); New York City, US
- Resting place: Ashes sprinkled into the Atlantic Ocean
- Occupation: Actor
- Years active: 1934–1995
- Spouse(s): Elaine Wodson (m. 1938; div. 1942); Joan Barbara Geary (m. 1950; div. 1967) Louise Troy (m. 1992; died 1994)
- Children: 2

Douglas Seale (28 October 1913 – 13 June 1999) was an English film and stage actor.

== Early life ==
Born in London, Seale was educated at Rutlish School in Wimbledon and trained for the stage at the Royal Academy of Dramatic Art.

== Career ==
He made his professional debut in 1934 and performed in theatre until 1940, before serving in the Royal Corps of Signals during World War II. After being demobbed in 1946, Seale joined the Shakespeare Memorial Theatre company in Stratford-upon-Avon for two seasons before turning to producing and directing stage plays in the United Kingdom and the United States. After returning to acting in later life, he enjoyed his greatest stage success playing Selsdon Mowbray in the 1983 Broadway production of Noises Off, for which he was nominated for the Tony Award for Best Featured Actor in a Play.

In film, Seale provided the voice of Krebbs the koala in The Rescuers Down Under (1990) and, two years later, the Sultan in Aladdin (1992) (with Val Bettin replacing him in the later productions). He also appeared in several films, including Miloš Forman's Amadeus (1984), and Ernest Saves Christmas (1988), in which he played Santa Claus. He appeared in the 1986 Christmas film, A Smoky Mountain Christmas, as Vernon. Seale had a small starring role as Santa in Steven Spielberg's Amazing Stories. In 1987, he appeared in the Cheers episode "A House Is Not a Home", and in 1989, in the Family Ties episode "Get Me to the Living Room on Time".

In television, Seale played the role of John Clapper the butler for Nick Foley in the series Rags to Riches from 1987 to 1988.

He also played a character "Malcolm" in the 1995 game Phantasmagoria.

== Personal life ==
Seale's third wife (after two divorces) was American film, television and stage actress, Louise Troy. They were married from 1992 until her death from breast cancer, aged 60, on 5 May 1994.

== Death ==
Seale died in New York City on 13 June 1999, aged 85, and was survived by his two sons from his second marriage, Jonathan and Timothy, and two grandchildren.

== Filmography ==
Year	Title	Role	Notes
1984	Amadeus	Count Arco	
1985	Heaven Help Us	Brother Domenic	
1986	A Smoky Mountain Christmas	Vernon	TV movie
1988	Ernest Saves Christmas	Santa Claus / Seth Applegate	
1989	Ghostbusters II	Plaza Hotel Man	
1989	A More Perfect Union	Lord Carmarthen	
1990	Mr. Destiny	Boswell	
1990	The Rescuers Down Under	Krebbs The Koala	Voice
1990	Almost an Angel	Father	
1992	Aladdin	Sultan	Voice
1993	For Love or Money	Freddy	
1995	Palookaville	Old Man	Final film role
