= Iago (Aladdin) =

Fictional character in Disney's Aladdin franchise

- Aladdin character
- Iago as he appears in the Kingdom Hearts series
- First appearance: Aladdin (1992)
- Created by: Will Finn; John Musker; Ron Clements; Howard Ashman
- Voiced by: Gilbert Gottfried (1992–2022); Alan Tudyk (2019 film); Barrett Leddy (Lego Disney Princess: The Castle Quest); Piotr Michael (2023–present)
- Portrayed by: Don Darryl Rivera (Broadway musical)
- Species: Red lory Red-and-green macaw (2019 film)

Iago is a fictional character who appears in Walt Disney Pictures' animated film Aladdin (1992), the direct-to-video sequels The Return of Jafar (1994), Aladdin and the King of Thieves (1996) and the television series. An anthropomorphic red-plumed parrot, he was voiced by Gilbert Gottfried in all animated appearances until Gottfried's death in 2022. He was voiced by Alan Tudyk in the live-action adaptation of Aladdin, by Barrett Leddy in the 2023 Disney+ special Lego Disney Princess: The Castle Quest, and by Piotr Michael in the 2023 crossover short Once Upon a Studio.

Iago appeared in the original film as a sidekick to the first main villain of the franchise, Jafar, functioning both as comic relief and the former secondary antagonist. He reformed for the better over the franchise's run in the sequels and television series, joining the protagonists as a hero and being a major protagonist in The Return of Jafar. His name is a homage to the villain of William Shakespeare's Othello.

== Development ==
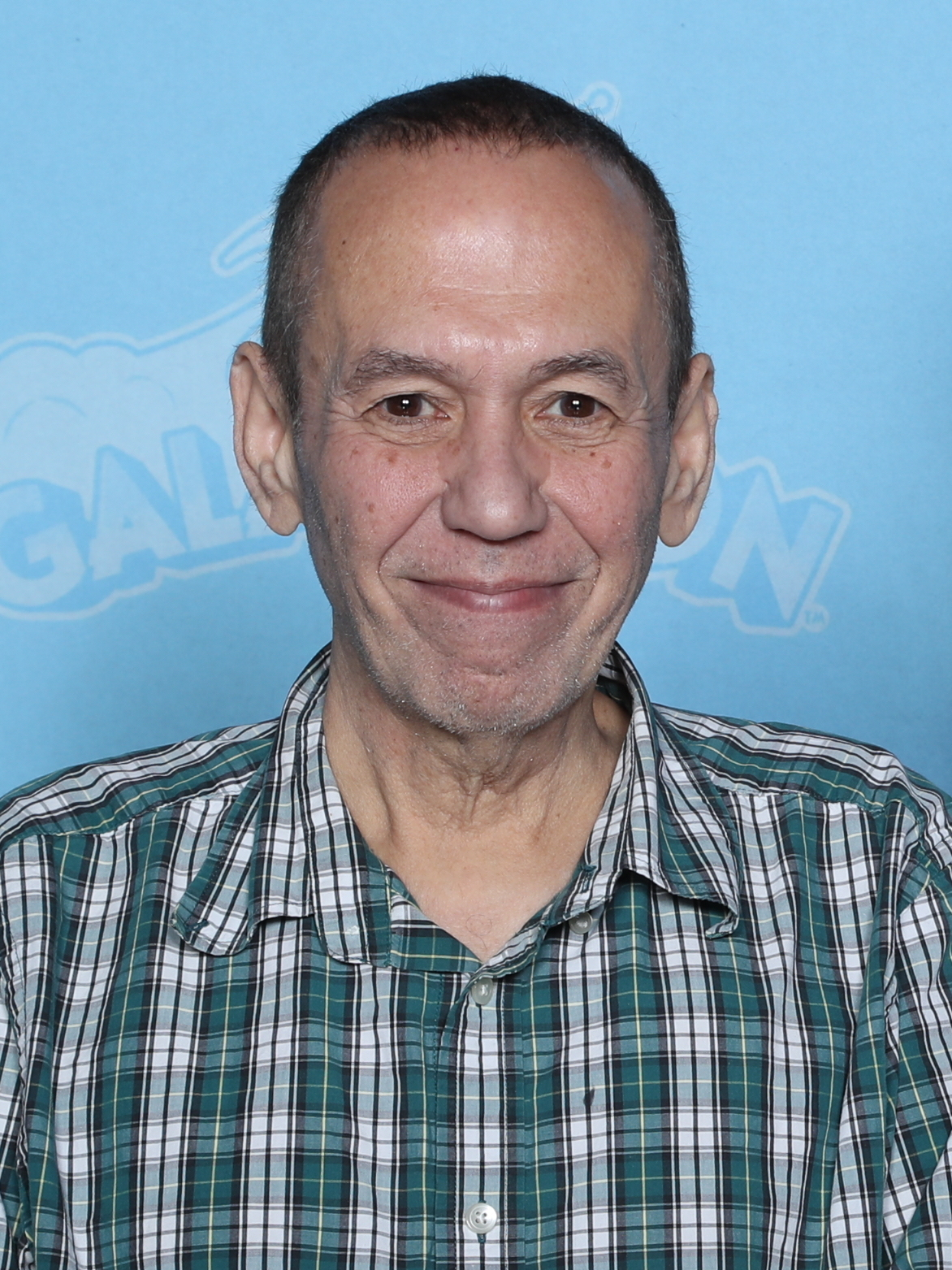
Iago's original voice actor Gilbert Gottfried

In the original story treatment by Howard Ashman for Aladdin, Iago (previously named Sinbad) had been originally conceived as a "British" calm and serious straight man working off Jafar, who was originally conceived as more over-the-top, comedic, and irritable, but the filmmakers later reversed their personalities in large part in order to make Jafar more threatening and when they saw Gilbert Gottfried in Beverly Hills Cop II, Gottfried was cast to provide Iago's voice.

Screenwriter Terry Rossio shared a concept behind Iago on his website Wordplay, in that Jafar transferred his emotions to his pet, allowing him to do magic without distractions. Rossio also mentioned, since Iago is too small to contain such emotions, "you end up with a feathered Gilbert Gottfried." Iago's animator Will Finn tried to incorporate some aspects of Gottfried's appearance into Iago's design, especially his trademark semi-closed eyes and the always-appearing teeth.

Gottfried has said that his voiceover career really began after voicing the character in the 1992 film. “... that has been one of those things that lives on,” he said. “That seemed to open the door for other voiceover jobs.”

Gottfried's onstage persona led to him being cast as the wise-cracking Iago. Gottfried is often referred to as "the Iago guy" and similar terms, being more known by his voice role than by name.

== Characteristics ==
Iago resembles a red lory, with red feathers and blue tipped wings, a bluish-purple tail, and white around the eyes. He can speak fluent English and has the ability to perfectly mimic voices. He also possesses knowledge of various tricks learned from Jafar. He is easily frustrated and openly vocalizes his frustrations, and avoids direct confrontations if he can help it, but when required, he can be quite cunning and mischievous.

Iago is somewhat arrogant and also known for his notorious greed of treasure and gold, for which he will go to outlandish lengths to acquire, usually dragging along Abu to help him, but Abu's incompetence always costs him. Iago is often put in situations of deciding between saving his own tail feathers or doing the right thing. His guilt always leads him to do the latter as he lacks a moral conscience; his greed leaves him unsatisfied in usually losing some form of reward or riches, for which he always berates himself afterwards. Overall, Iago is good at heart, despite his flaws.

Iago's name is a reference to the character of the same name. In Shakespeare's play Othello, Iago is the name of the titular protagonist's standard-bearer; though believed to be trustworthy, all he cares about is getting himself ahead and his own wants. The play revolves around his devious scheme to find a way to get what he wants—an unpleasant surprise to everyone when he is exposed.

== Appearances ==
According to a piece of conversation in The Return of Jafar, Jafar had picked up Iago in Agrabah's bazaar and reared him as his accomplice-in-crime. He also mentions in the animated series of having a criminal twin brother named Othello, reference to his name's supposed origins.

=== Aladdin ===
In the first movie, he resents living under the Sultan and Jasmine as much as his owner Jafar does, though he contrasts Jafar's dark brooding with angry, sarcastic ranting. Iago often says how he hates crackers which the Sultan always force-feeds him. The Sultan seems to not know until the end of the first film that Iago can fully comprehend and converse in human speech and is evil. In the end, Iago is dragged into Jafar's lamp with him at the end of the film and is banished to the Cave of Wonders.

=== The Return of Jafar ===
Almost a year after the events of the first film, Iago manages to escape from the lamp, but refuses to free Jafar, having grown tired of being ordered around, and instead throws him into a well. After returning to Agrabah, Iago is confronted by Aladdin but inadvertently ends up saving him from Abis Mal and his henchmen. In gratitude, Aladdin takes Iago back to the palace and convinces the Sultan to give him a second chance. Iago slowly begins warming up to Aladdin, but Jafar also returns to Agrabah, having been freed by Abis Mal, and tricks Iago into conspiring with him to frame Aladdin for the Sultan's murder and have him executed while Aladdin's friends are locked in the dungeon for life, but turns against Jafar and again saves Aladdin by freeing the Genie, who saves Aladdin from being executed. In the final battle against Jafar, Iago is severely injured by one of Jafar's blasts, but manages to kick Jafar's lamp into the molten lava, destroying it and Jafar once and for all, while he is taken to safety by Aladdin. From the Sultan's wrath in return for Iago unintentionally saving him from Abis Mal, and finally risking his life to kill Jafar by pushing his lamp into molten lava. Following his heroic deed, he is accepted into the palace.

=== Aladdin TV series ===
In the series, he provides a sarcastic, realistic, or cowardly perspective on events and is only really willing to face danger if the great reward is promised. However, he is sometimes forced to battle his conscience, and generally does the right thing even when he does not have to or could just as easily leave the city altogether: when Sadira used memory sand that somehow caused her and Jasmine to switch lives, with animals unaffected, Iago leads Abu and Rajah in finding Jasmine to restore the world to normal. Iago's common schemes involve trying to sell anything with any value (real or not), trying to steal things, and trying to treasure-hunt; he can usually convince Abu to be his partner in crime, but Abu is more likely to leave at the first sign of danger and often lacks the finesse that Iago requires. He cares a lot about Abu, though, as shown in episodes such as "Much Abu About Something".

=== Aladdin and the King of Thieves ===
He helps out with Aladdin and Jasmine's wedding, as well as aiding Aladdin to find his estranged father Cassim, who happens to be the King of the Forty Thieves. Acting on behalf for Aladdin, Iago convinces Cassim to attend the wedding, promising that he will help him get the Hand of Midas. In the end, although the Sultan pardoned him from the sentence of life imprisonment for his complicity with the King of Thieves, Iago chooses to depart Agrabah for a while with Cassim.

=== Aladdin (2019) ===
Iago appears in the 2019 live-action Aladdin, voiced by Alan Tudyk. It marks the first time Iago is not voiced by Gilbert Gottfried, who confirmed that he was not asked to reprise the role.

=== In video games ===
==== Kingdom Hearts series ====
In the Kingdom Hearts video game series, Iago's Japanese voice actor in Kingdom Hearts is Akira Kamiya, and his voice actor in Kingdom Hearts II is Tōru Ōkawa. Gilbert Gottfried reprises his role in the English versions of both games.

In the video game Kingdom Hearts, he is Jafar's sidekick, having a similar role of the Aladdin film.

In Kingdom Hearts: Chain of Memories, he makes a brief cameo appearance during the boss battle against Jafar's genie form. During the battle, attacking Jafar has no effect. Rather, the lamp must be hit which is held up high by Iago, trying to protect his boss' lamp.

In Kingdom Hearts II, like in The Return of Jafar, Iago leaves Jafar and returns to Agrabah, desperate to make amends to Aladdin and Jasmine. When he assists Sora in the task of beating the Heartless and retrieving Jafar's lamp, he manages to gain everyone's trust. But that trust is soon shattered when Iago is tricked to help Jafar yet again in keeping Sora and the others occupied at the ruins. Despite losing faith, Iago redeems himself by intentionally getting shot by a spell that Jafar intended to shoot at Aladdin.

A data based version of Iago appears in Kingdom Hearts Coded playing a small role first helping Jafar steal Genie's lamp and later appearing during the battle against Jafar, playing a similar role to past games. The later HD cinematic version of Kingdom Hearts Re:Coded that was created for Kingdom Hearts HD 2.5 Remix includes new dialogue for Iago.

==== Other video games ====
Iago appears as a recurring minor antagonist in the game released for the Super Nintendo. He appears in levels near the end of the game and will bombard Aladdin with chattering skulls as an attack.

He appears in the Sega Genesis game released around the same time. A bonus game for Abu also includes "Iago's cousins", who are obstacles to be avoided.

=== Other appearances ===
Iago appears as a supporting character in the straight-to-DVD film Disney Princess Enchanted Tales: Follow Your Dreams, where he has returned to Agrabah. He performs a musical number called "Peacock Princess" with Princess Jasmine in her princess duties.

At Walt Disney World, along with Zazu from The Lion King, he was introduced as one of the hosts of The Enchanted Tiki Room (Under New Management) in 1998. Following a small fire in 2011, the two were removed as the attraction reverted to its earlier format as Walt Disney's Enchanted Tiki Room. Reports had described the 1998 format as "unpopular" and Iago as "annoying".

Iago also appears in the stage adaptation of the film. However, unlike his film counterpart, he is portrayed as a human, working as a personal assistant to Jafar.

Iago appears as a secondary antagonist in the Disney+ animated special Lego Disney Princess: The Castle Quest, voiced by Barrett Leddy. This was the first time someone other than Gilbert Gottfried has voiced his character in an animated production following his passing in 2022.

Iago also appears alongside Jafar in Disney's short film Once Upon a Studio, this time voiced by Piotr Michael.

== Reception ==
In reviews for The Return of Jafar, Iago was often described as being the real star of the film: "The plot thickens when Aladdin becomes indebted to Jafar's former partner, Iago (a wisecracking parrot), for saving his life. Struggling with issues of honesty and loyalty, Iago becomes the film's focus as he grapples between standing by Aladdin or succumbing back to Jafar's evil pressures."

== In popular culture ==
Iago's ability of mimicking voices (e.g., Aladdin) was referenced during a sketch entitled the "Real Housewives of Disney" in an episode of Saturday Night Live.
