= Disney's Aladdin (1994 video game) =

1994 Game Gear video game

Aladdin
- Cover art for the North American Sega Game Gear version
- Developer: SIMS
- Publisher: Sega
- Composer: Yoko Wada
- Series: Aladdin
- Platforms: Game Gear, Master System
- Release: Game Gear: JP: March 25, 1994; EU: March 30, 1994; NA: May 1994; Master System: EU: March 30, 1994
- Genre: Platformer
- Mode: Single-player

Aladdin is a 1994 platform game developed by SIMS Co., Ltd. for the Game Gear and Master System. Based on the 1992 animated film of the same name, Aladdin is a side-scrolling platform game in which the player character is Aladdin.

The Genesis game differs markedly from the 8-bit game on the Game Gear and Master System.

== Development ==
The Walt Disney Company gave Sega a license to create Aladdin games for both the Game Gear and the Sega Genesis because of Sega's previous successes with other Disney video games, such as Castle of Illusion Starring Mickey Mouse and QuackShot.

== Reception ==
Reception

Review scores
Publication	Score
Electronic Gaming Monthly	9/10, 7/10, 7/10, 7/10
Famitsu	7/10, 7/10, 7/10, 6/10
GamePro	14.5 / 20
Consoles +	88%
Guardiana	89%
Joypad	86%
Player One	88%
Sonic the Comic	85%

Awards
Publication	Award
GamePro	Best Game Gear Game (CES)
VideoGames (1994)	Best Game Gear Game (runner-up)
Complex	25 Greatest Handheld Games of All Time

In the United States, it topped the Game Gear sales charts for three months in 1994, from June to August 1994. In the United Kingdom, it was the top-selling Game Gear game in April 1994.

GamePro named Disney's Aladdin the best Game Gear game at the 1994 Consumer Electronics Show, remarking, "Gorgeous background graphics and detailed, quick-moving sprites make this a magical adventure, indeed." Their subsequent review of the game was more critical. Though they maintained that the graphics are exceptionally good, they criticized the controls and the beginner-level challenge, commenting, "It would have been better to spend less money on the animated sequences and more on putting better game play into the cart." Four reviewers from Electronic Gaming Monthly wrote reviews of the game, with one saying it was "one of those must-have carts if you own this system" while another saying "If you buy one Game Gear game all year, Aladdin is definitely a good choice." while adding "it's no Genesis conversion but it's still a blast nonetheless."

== Legacy ==
In 2013, Complex listed the game as one of the 25 best handheld video games made, arguing that it combines elements of two other Disney's Aladdin video games: the Super Nintendo Entertainment System game and the Genesis game.
