= Aladdin (franchise) =

Disney media franchise

- Created by: Walt Disney Animation Studios; Ron Clements; John Musker
- Original work: Aladdin (1992)
- Owner: The Walt Disney Company
- Years: 1992–present

Films and television
- Films: Aladdin (1992; animated); Aladdin (2019; live-action)
- Animated series: Aladdin (1994–1995)
- Television special: "Hercules and the Arabian Night" (1999 episode of Disney's Hercules: The Animated Series)^{*}
- Television film: Descendants (2015)^{*}
- Direct-to-video: The Return of Jafar (1994); Aladdin and the King of Thieves (1996); Mickey's House of Villains (2002)^{*}; Disney Princess Enchanted Tales: Follow Your Dreams (2007; More Than a Peacock Princess segment)

Theatrical presentations
- Musicals: Aladdin Jr.; Disney's Aladdin: A Musical Spectacular (2003); Aladdin (2011)

Games
- Video games: Disney's Aladdin (1993; Virgin Games); Disney's Aladdin (1993; Capcom); Disney's Aladdin (1994; SIMS); Disney's Aladdin Activity Center (1994); Disney's Aladdin Print Kit (1994); Disney's Aladdin in Nasira's Revenge (2001); Kingdom Hearts (2002)^{*}; Kingdom Hearts: Chain of Memories (2004)^{*}; Kingdom Hearts II (2005)^{*}; Kinect: Disneyland Adventures (2011)^{*}; Disney Infinity 2.0 (2014)^{*}; Disney Magic Kingdoms (2016)^{*}; Disney Mirrorverse (2022)^{*}; Disney Speedstorm (2023)^{*}

Audio
- Soundtracks: Aladdin (1992); Aladdin (2019)

Miscellaneous
- Theme park attractions: Adventureland Bazaar (1992–present); Le Passage Enchanté d'Aladdin (1993–present); The Enchanted Tiki Room (Under New Management) (1998–2011)^{*}; The Magic Carpets of Aladdin (2001–present); Arabian Coast (2001–present); Disney's Aladdin: A Musical Spectacular (2003–2016)
- Based on: Aladdin and the Magic Lamp from One Thousand and One Nights (Note: Aladdin and the Magic Lamp was originally authored by Hanna Diyab, and was added to the One Thousand and One Nights by Antoine Galland, appearing in his French translation Les mille et une nuits.)
- ^{*} Work where this franchise's characters or settings appeared as part of a crossover, or has characters based on those from this franchise.

Aladdin is a Disney media franchise comprising a film series and additional media. It began with the 1992 American animated feature of the same name, which was based on the tale of the same name, and was directed by Ron Clements and John Musker. The success of the film led to two direct-to-video sequels, a television series (which had a crossover episode with Hercules: The Animated Series), a Broadway musical, a live-action remake, various rides and themed areas in Disney's theme parks, several video games, and merchandise, among other related works.

== Films ==
Film	U.S. release date	Director(s)	Screenwriter(s)	Story by	Producer(s)
Animated Theatrical films
Aladdin	November 25, 1992	John Musker and Ron Clements	Ron Clements, John Musker, Ted Elliott and Terry Rossio	Burny Mattinson, Roger Allers, Daan Jippes, Kevin Harkey, Sue Nichols, Francis Glebas, Darrell Roonney, Larry Leker, James Fujii, Kirk Hanson, Kevin Lima, Rebecca Rees, David S. Smith, Chris Sanders, Brian Pimental and Patrick A. Ventura	John Musker and Ron Clements
Direct-to-Video films
The Return of Jafar	May 20, 1994	Toby Shelton, Tad Stones and Alan Zaslove	Kevin Campbell, Mirith J.S. Colao, Bill Motz, Steve Roberts, Dev Ross, Bob Roth, Jan Strnad and Brian Swenlin	Duane Capizzi, Douglas Langdale, Mark McCorkle, Robert Schooley and Tad Stones	Tad Stones and Alan Zaslove
Aladdin and the King of Thieves	August 13, 1996	Tad Stones	Mark McCorkle and Robert Schooley	Mark McCorkle and Robert Schooley	Tad Stones and Jeannine Roussel
Live-Action Theatrical films
Aladdin	May 24, 2019	Guy Ritchie	John August and Guy Ritchie	John August and Guy Ritchie	Dan Lin and Jonathan Eirich
Untitled Aladdin sequel	TBA	Guy Ritchie	TBA	TBA	Dan Lin and Jonathan Eirich
Spin-off feature film
Untitled Prince Anders spin-off	TBA	TBA	Jordan Dunn and Michael Kvamme	Jordan Dunn and Michael Kvamme	TBA

=== Animated feature films ===
==== Aladdin (1992) ====
Aladdin is the original film of the franchise. It was produced by Walt Disney Feature Animation, and was released on November 25, 1992, by Walt Disney Pictures. It was produced and directed by Ron Clements and John Musker, and belongs to an era known as the Disney Renaissance. Based on the Arabic folktale of Aladdin and the Magic Lamp from the One Thousand and One Nights, the plot follows street urchin Aladdin as he attempts to gain the affection of Princess Jasmine after acquiring a magic lamp.

==== The Return of Jafar (1994) ====
Aladdin was followed by Disney's first direct-to-video sequel, The Return of Jafar. It was produced by Walt Disney Television Animation, and was released on May 20, 1994, by Walt Disney Home Video. It was directed by Toby Shelton, Tad Stones, and Alan Zaslove. The plot mainly focused on Jafar seeking revenge on Aladdin. However, this time, with Iago on Aladdin's side, Abis Mal becomes Jafar's new henchman. Now, Aladdin and co. must find a way to thwart Jafar, with his limitless genie power.

==== Aladdin and the King of Thieves (1996) ====
Aladdin and the King of Thieves is the second and final direct-to-video sequel to Aladdin. It was directed by Tad Stones and was released on August 14, 1996, by Walt Disney Home Video. The story concludes as Aladdin and Jasmine are about to have their wedding and Aladdin discovers that his father is still alive, but is the leader of the Forty Thieves.

==== More Than a Peacock Princess (2007) ====
In 2005, screenwriter Robert Reece pitched a fourth Aladdin feature to DisneyToon Studios execs, although it never came to fruition. In 2007, DisneyToon Studios produced Disney Princess Enchanted Tales: Follow Your Dreams, a crossover film with Sleeping Beauty. The second half of the film, More Than a Peacock Princess, follows Princess Jasmine, sometime after the events of Aladdin and the King of Thieves as she becomes tired and bored of her usual princess duties, and upon requesting more responsibility from her father, is assigned the role of Royal Assistant Educator.

=== Live-action feature films ===
==== Aladdin (2019) ====
A live-action Aladdin movie was released on May 24, 2019, directed by Guy Ritchie with John August as the writer and Dan Lin and Jonathan Eirich as the producers and stars Mena Massoud as Aladdin, Naomi Scott as Princess Jasmine, Marwan Kenzari as Jafar and Will Smith as Genie.

==== Untitled Aladdin sequel (TBA) ====
On August 12, 2019, producer Dan Lin announced his enthusiasm for a sequel and revealed that Disney is in the early stages of developing a follow-up. The studio also hopes to bring back Guy Ritchie to direct and Will Smith to reprise his role as The Genie while also telling a story that's "fresh and new". On February 12, 2020, it was announced that Ritchie will be returning as director with Lin and Jonathan Eirich returning as producers. In addition, Ryan Halprin joined the film as executive producer.

==== Untitled Prince Anders spin-off (TBA) ====
On December 6, 2019, The Hollywood Reporter reported that Disney was in the early stages of developing a spin-off of Aladdin for Disney+ centered on Prince Anders, tentatively titled Prince Anders, with Jordan Dunn and Michael Kvamme writing the script and Billy Magnussen reprising his role.

==== Genies (TBA) ====
On July 15, 2015, it was reported that a live-action prequel to Aladdin (2019) was in development under the title Genies. The new film will reportedly focus on genies and their realm and reveal how Aladdin's genie ended up in the lamp. The film was being written by Damian Shannon and Mark Swift. Tripp Vinson was to serve as a producer through Vinson Films.

== Television ==
=== Aladdin (1994–1995) ===
Shortly after The Return of Jafar, an animated series was produced. The episodes focused on Aladdin's adventures after the events of the second film. Produced by Tad Stones and Alan Zaslove, the series aired from February 6, 1994, to November 25, 1995, having originally aired as a preview on The Disney Channel before airing simultaneously on the syndicated block The Disney Afternoon and CBS. It was later shown in reruns on Disney Channel and Toon Disney.

=== Descendants (2015–2019) ===
Descendants is a live-action Disney Channel Original film series based on the lives of the children of various Disney heroes and villains when they attend the same prep school. Jafar appears in the first film as does his son, Jay, who additionally appears its two sequels.

=== Other shows ===
The Aladdin characters later made a crossover with the 1998 animated series, Hercules, and were featured as guests in the television series House of Mouse and related works to those series—Jafar was the leader of the villains in Mickey's House of Villains.

== Agrabah ==
Agrabah is a fictional sultanate that serves as the setting for the Aladdin franchise. Aladdin was initially intended to be set in the Iraqi city of Baghdad, but after the Gulf War happened, the name Agrabah was chosen as an approximate anagram of the name of the city of Baghdad. In Aladdin, the Peddler mentions that Agrabah is placed close to the Jordan River.

== Cast and characters ==
List indicators

This section includes characters who will appear or have appeared in more than two films in the series.

- An empty grey cell indicates the character was not in the film, or that the character's official presence has not yet been confirmed.
- ^{U} indicates an uncredited appearance.
- ^{S} indicates an appearance as a character's singing voice.

Characters	Animated films			Television series			Video games		Live-action film
Characters	Aladdin	The Return of Jafar	Aladdin and the King of Thieves	Aladdin			Disney's Math Quest with Aladdin	Disney's Aladdin in Nasira's Revenge	Aladdin
Characters	Aladdin	The Return of Jafar	Aladdin and the King of Thieves	Season 1	Season 2	Season 3	Disney's Math Quest with Aladdin	Disney's Aladdin in Nasira's Revenge	Aladdin
Aladdin	Scott Weinger	Scott Weinger	Scott Weinger	Scott Weinger	Scott Weinger	Scott Weinger	Scott Weinger	Scott Weinger	Mena Massoud
Aladdin	Brad Kane^{S}	Brad Kane^{S}	Brad Kane^{S}	Scott Weinger	Scott Weinger	Scott Weinger	Scott Weinger	Brad Kane^{S}	Mena Massoud
Genie / Peddler (Note: The Peddler from the original animated film and its sequels is replaced by the Mariner in the live-action film.)	Robin Williams	Dan Castellaneta	Robin Williams	Dan Castellaneta	Dan Castellaneta	Dan Castellaneta	Robin Williams	Dan Castellaneta	Will Smith
Genie / Peddler	Bruce Adler^{S}	Dan Castellaneta	Bruce Adler^{S}	Dan Castellaneta	Dan Castellaneta	Dan Castellaneta	Robin Williams	Dan Castellaneta	Will Smith
Princess Jasmine	Linda Larkin	Linda Larkin	Linda Larkin	Linda Larkin	Linda Larkin	Linda Larkin	Linda Larkin	Linda Larkin	Naomi Scott
Princess Jasmine	Lea Salonga^{S}	Liz Callaway^{S}	Liz Callaway^{S}	Linda Larkin	Linda Larkin	Linda Larkin	Linda Larkin	Lea Salonga^{S}	Naomi Scott
Jafar	Jonathan Freeman	Jonathan Freeman	Silent cameo					Jonathan Freeman	Marwan Kenzari
Abu	Frank Welker	Frank Welker	Frank Welker	Frank Welker	Frank Welker	Frank Welker	Frank Welker	Frank Welker	Frank Welker^{U}
Iago	Gilbert Gottfried	Gilbert Gottfried	Gilbert Gottfried	Gilbert Gottfried	Gilbert Gottfried	Gilbert Gottfried	Gilbert Gottfried	Gilbert Gottfried	Alan Tudyk
The Sultan	Douglas Seale	Val Bettin	Val Bettin	Val Bettin	Val Bettin	Val Bettin		Val Bettin	Navid Negahban
Rajah	Frank Welker	Frank Welker	Frank Welker	Frank Welker	Frank Welker	Frank Welker		Silent cameo	Frank Welker^{U}
Razoul	Jim Cummings	Jim Cummings	Jim Cummings	Jim Cummings	Jim Cummings	Jim Cummings		Jim Cummings	Robby Haynes^{U}
Cave of Wonders	Frank Welker	Silent cameo						Frank Welker	Frank Welker
Omar	Charlie Adler	Dan Castellaneta							
Farouk (Note: In the original animated film version of Aladdin, the Merchant who causes Aladdin and Jasmine to meet is known as Farouk. In the live-action remake, the character is renamed to Jamal.)	Jim Cummings				Jim Cummings				Amir Boutrous
Prince Achmed (Note: In the original animated film version of Aladdin, the Prince who attempts to marry Princess Jasmine is known as Prince Achmed. In the live-action remake, the character is renamed to Prince Anders.)	Corey Burton								Billy Magnussen
Abis Mal		Jason Alexander		Jason Alexander	Jason Alexander	Jason Alexander			
Hakim		Frank Welker	Corey Burton		Frank Welker				Numan Acar
Cassim			John Rhys-Davies						
Cassim			Merwin Foard^{S}						
Sa'luk			Jerry Orbach						
The Oracle			CCH Pounder						
Merc			Silent cameo	Dorian Harewood	Dorian Harewood				
Prince Uncouthma			Silent cameo		Tino Insana				
Sadira			Silent cameo		Kellie Martin				
Fasir				Ed Gilbert	Ed Gilbert	Ed Gilbert			
Amin Damoola				Jeff Bennett	Jeff Bennett				
Mozenrath					Jonathan Brandis	Jonathan Brandis			
Mozenrath					Jeff Bennett	Jonathan Brandis			
Mirage					Bebe Neuwirth	Bebe Neuwirth			
Eden					Valery Pappas	Valery Pappas			
Mukhtar					John Kassir	John Kassir			
Haroud Hazi Bin					James Avery				
Bizarrah							April Winchell		
Nasira								Jodi Benson	
Dalia									Nasim Pedrad

=== Crew ===
Crew/detail	Film			
Crew/detail	Aladdin	The Return of Jafar	Aladdin and the King of Thieves	Aladdin
Composer(s)	Alan Menken	Mark Watters	Carl Johnson; Mark Watters	Alan Menken
Songwriter(s)	Howard Ashman; Alan Menken; Tim Rice	Randy Petersen; Kevin Quinn; Dale Gonyea; Michael Silversher; Patty Silversher	David Friedman; Randy Petersen; Kevin Quinn	Alan Menken; Howard Ashman; Tim Rice; Benj Pasek; Justin Paul
Editor(s)	Mark A. Hester; H. Lee Peterson	Robert S. Birchard; Elen Orson	Elen Orson	James Herbert
Production companies	Walt Disney Feature Animation	Walt Disney Studios Home Entertainment; Walt Disney Television Animation; Walt Disney Animation Australia; Walt Disney Animation Japan; Disneytoon Studios	Walt Disney Studios Home Entertainment; Walt Disney Television Animation; Walt Disney Animation Australia; Disneytoon Studios	Walt Disney Pictures; Rideback
Distributor	Buena Vista Pictures	Walt Disney Home Video	Walt Disney Home Video	Walt Disney Studios Motion Pictures

== Reception ==
=== Box office performance ===
Film	Release date	Box office gross			Budget	Reference
Film	Release date	United States and Canada	Other territories	Worldwide	Budget	Reference
Aladdin	November 25, 1992	$217,350,219	$287,700,000	$504,050,219	$28,000,000	
Aladdin	May 24, 2019	$355,559,216	$695,134,737	$1,050,693,953	$183,000,000	
Total		$572,905,435	$982,834,737	$1,554,744,172	$211,000,000	

=== Home media performance ===
Animated film video sales in the United States
Film	Video release	US video sales				US sales revenue (est.)
Film	Video release	VHS	DVD	Blu-ray	All formats	US sales revenue (est.)
Aladdin	October 1, 1993	30,000,000	2,820,000	1,807,236	34,627,236	$747,891,827
The Return of Jafar	May 20, 1994	15,000,000	Unknown	Unknown	15,000,000+	$344,850,000
Aladdin and the King of Thieves	August 13, 1996	10,300,000	Unknown	Unknown	10,300,000+	$257,397,000
Total		55,300,000	2,820,000+	1,807,236+	59,927,236+	$1,350,138,827

Remake home entertainment revenue
Film	Home media release	Net revenue	Ref
Aladdin	August 27, 2019	$345,000,000	

=== Critical and audience response ===
Film	Year	Critics		Audiences	
Film	Year	Rotten Tomatoes	Metacritic	CinemaScore	PostTrak
Aladdin	1992	94% (74 reviews)	86 (25 reviews)	A+	—N/a
The Return of Jafar	1994	33% (12 reviews)	—N/a	—N/a	—N/a
Aladdin and the King of Thieves	1996	33% (12 reviews)	—N/a	—N/a	—N/a
Aladdin	2019	57% (383 reviews)	53 (50 reviews)	A	90%

== Video games ==
Along with the film release, three different video games based on Aladdin were released. Disney's Aladdin, an international co-production between Virgin Games and Walt Disney Feature Animation for the Genesis, was released in late 1993 and later ported to Nintendo Entertainment System, PC, Game Boy and Game Boy Color. That same year, Capcom released a Super NES game, also called Disney's Aladdin, which was ported to the Game Boy Advance in 2002. In 1994, SIMS released another game called Disney's Aladdin for the Game Gear and Master System. These video games based on the original Aladdin film earned $200,000,000 (equivalent to $450,000,000 in 2025) in sales revenue.

The television series inspired another game by Argonaut Games, entitled Aladdin: Nasira's Revenge and released in 2000 for the PlayStation and PC. Also, in 2004 Vivendi Universal released Disney's Aladdin Chess Adventures, a chess computer game with the Aladdin license.

The Kingdom Hearts series features a playable Aladdin world known as Agrabah. In Kingdom Hearts and Kingdom Hearts: Chain of Memories, the plotline is loosely related to the storyline of the original film. In Kingdom Hearts II, it is a mixture of Aladdin and The Return of Jafar. Genie is also a recurring summon in the series.

Aladdin, Jasmine, and the Genie appeared in the 2011 motion-controlled game, Kinect: Disneyland Adventures, as meet-and-greet characters. Aladdin was also referenced throughout the Disney Infinity series via power discs and in-game toys, with Aladdin and Jasmine being added to the series as playable characters in the series' second game, Disney Infinity 2.0.

During a limited time Event focused on Aladdin, the world builder game Disney Magic Kingdoms included Aladdin, Jasmine, Genie, Abu, Carpet, Jafar and Iago as playable characters, along with some attractions based on the franchise, and costumes of Prince Ali and Purple Dress for Aladdin and Jasmine, respectively. The Sultan and Rajah were also included as playable characters in a later update of the game. In the game the characters are involved in new storylines that serve as a continuation of the Aladdin animated film (ignoring other material in the franchise).

=== Disney's Aladdin by Virgin Games ===
Disney's Aladdin was developed for the Sega Genesis by Virgin Interactive's studio of Virgin Games USA and published by Sega in 1993. This was due to the fact that Sega had both obtained a license for publishing video games based on Disney's motion picture and established a collaboration deal with Disney's animation studios which was a first in the video game industry, so Sega of America tasked the Virgin Games USA development team with the programming duties because of their successful previous efforts with McDonald's Global Gladiators and 7 Up's Cool Spot. The game has been noted for its use of traditional animation, which was produced by Disney animators under the supervision of Virgin's animation staff, including animation producer Andy Luckey, technical director Paul Schmiedeke and animation director Mike Dietz, using an in-house "Digicel" process to compress the data onto the cartridge. The game also featured arrangements and original compositions composed by Donald S. Griffin.

=== Disney's Aladdin by Capcom ===
Disney's Aladdin (アラジン, Arajin) was developed for the Super NES and published by Capcom separately from Virgin's version, since Capcom still held Disney licensing rights for Nintendo consoles at the time of the film's release. Although the game is still a side-scrolling platformer, it is significantly different in both presentation and gameplay. Similarly following the movie's storyline, players control Aladdin as he jumps on enemies, vaults off stumps and performs various acrobatic feats to get through levels. Throughout the level, Aladdin can collect apples to throw at enemies and golden scarabs which unlock bonus stages. Throughout each level there are various diamonds (collecting all within a level also unlocking bonus stages), with players able to unlock an extra challenge if they collect 70 red diamonds. The game was later ported to the Game Boy Advance with extra stages, though all the songs based directly on the original movie were replaced with new music, possibly because of copyright reasons. It was also unofficially ported to the NES in 1995 by Hummer Team.

=== Disney's Aladdin by SIMS ===
Disney's Aladdin was developed by SIMS and published by Sega, and released in 1994 for the Game Gear worldwide and for the Master System in Europe. Sega went on to produce this game since they already had the necessary intellectual property licensing rights in order to publish the Virgin Interactive game on the Genesis. The game is also significantly different in gameplay compared to its Genesis counterpart. There are three main types of level, chase levels in which Aladdin must outrun enemies while dodging obstacles, exploration levels in which Aladdin must carefully navigate traps and solve puzzles, similar to Prince of Persia, and carpet levels in which Aladdin rides his flying carpet. It also, unlike its 16-bit counterparts, fairly closely follow the plot of the movie, even including cut scenes containing entire dialogue scenes from the movie.

=== Aladdin the Series: Tower of Gold Adventure ===
Aladdin the Series: Tower of Gold Adventure is a handheld electronic game that was developed and published by Tiger Electronics in 1994 in the United States. It is based on the television series of the same name.

=== Disney's Aladdin Activity Center ===
Disney's Aladdin Activity Center is part of the Disney's Activity Center series.

=== Disney's Aladdin Print Studio ===
Disney's Aladdin Print Studio is part of the Disney's Print Studio series.

=== Disney's Aladdin in Nasira's Revenge ===
Disney's Aladdin in Nasira's Revenge is the Aladdin franchise video game which was developed for the PlayStation and PC by Argonaut Games and distributed by Disney Interactive in 2001. The game is set after the events of The Return of Jafar, during the television series, and before Aladdin and the King of Thieves. The legendary city of Agrabah is in trouble again: the evil sorceress Nasira (Jodi Benson) is out to avenge the death of her brother, the nefarious sorcerer Jafar (Jonathan Freeman). She begins her vengeful plot by taking over the palace with a spell and kidnapping Princess Jasmine (Linda Larkin) and the Sultan; she then commands the guard's captain Razoul (Jim Cummings) to bring Aladdin (Scott Weinger) to her. The treacherous Nasira believes that if she collects a set of ancient relics that are spread all over Agrabah she might be able to revive Jafar and take over the world, and so she uses her captives to force Aladdin into doing this job for her.

=== Disney's Aladdin Pinball ===
Disney's Aladdin Pinball is video game developed for Windows by Disney Interactive and published by Disney Online. It was released on July 11, 2005. The game consists of three separate pinball tables that can be traversed in a single game. They include The Market Place, The Cave of Wonders, and the Royal Palace.

=== Disney's Math Quest with Aladdin ===
Disney's Math Quest with Aladdin is a 1997 educational game by Disney Interactive, and part of the Aladdin franchise. It was released as a CD-ROM for Windows and Macintosh personal computers.

=== Critical reception ===
Game	Platform	Developer	Year	GameRankings	Metacritic
Disney's Aladdin	Sega Genesis	Virgin Games	1993	88%	—N/a
Disney's Aladdin	Super Nintendo Entertainment System	Capcom	1993	78%	—N/a
Disney's Aladdin in Nasira's Revenge	Sony PlayStation	Argonaut Games	2001	65%	61/100
Disney's Aladdin	Game Boy Advance	Capcom	2004	65%	59/100

== Adaptations ==
=== Musical theatre ===
In November 2010 Alan Menken confirmed that a musical theatre adaptation of the show is in the works with a book written by Chad Beguelin. The show premiered at the 5th Avenue Theatre from July 7–31, 2011. Jonathan Freeman, who voiced Jafar in the film, played the role in the stage adaptation. Adam Jacobs and Courtney Reed played Aladdin and Jasmine. Additional actors included Seán G. Griffin as the Sultan; Don Darryl Rivera as Iago; and, playing Omar, Babkak, and Kassim – a trio of characters originally conceived by the film's creators but not used – Andrew Keenan-Bolger, Brian Gonzales, and Brandon O'Neill. The show was also directed and choreographed by Casey Nicholaw. Another production of the musical played at the Muny Theatre in St. Louis from July 5–13, 2012. The musical premiered on Broadway on February 26, 2014 (in previews) and officially opened on March 20, 2014, at the New Amsterdam Theatre, taking the place of Mary Poppins. The musical had a pre-Broadway tryout at the Ed Mirvish Theatre in Toronto lasting from November 13, 2013, to January 12, 2014. Casey Nicholaw directed and choreographed, with Chad Beguelin writing the book and additional lyrics, Bob Crowley as the scene designer, and costume design by Gregg Barnes. Aladdin the musical was also opened at Tokyo's Dentsu Shiki Theatre Umi in May 2015. It had its European premiere in December 2015 at the Stage Theatre Neue Flora in Hamburg. It opened in Sydney and London's West End in 2016.

In addition, a stage adaptation of the movie has been created for younger students, known as Disney's Aladdin Jr. Licensing and performing rights are currently being held by Music Theatre International. MTI licenses both a "Kids" version (which uses doubling to foster more of an ensemble feeling among young children) and a "Dual Language" version (which takes the Junior version and adds an element of half the characters speaking only in Spanish).

A recording of the show was set for release on Disney+ in 2025.

=== Novels ===
In 2015 Disney Press launched a young adult novel series that retells Disney films but with certain elements changed. The first novel in the series is A Whole New World: A Twisted Tale, written by Liz Braswell, a dark fantasy which retells the film but with Jafar gaining control of the genie before Aladdin does.

== Attractions ==
- The Magic Carpets of Aladdin, a Dumbo the Flying Elephant-like ride (Magic Kingdom at Walt Disney World Resort; and Walt Disney Studios Park at Disneyland Resort Paris).
- Arabian Coast
- Le Passage Enchanté d'Aladdin
- Adventureland Bazaar

The film also inspired a Disney On Ice presentation, as well as the show Disney's Aladdin: A Musical Spectacular at Disney California Adventure Park.

=== Meet and greets ===
Aladdin, Jasmine, Genie and the Sultan, and occasionally Jafar all appear as meetable characters in the Disney Parks and Resorts. They are all usually based in Adventureland.
