= Aladdin (2019 film) =

Film by Guy Ritchie

- Theatrical release poster
- Directed by: Guy Ritchie
- Screenplay by: John August; Guy Ritchie
- Based on: Disney's Aladdin by; Ron Clements; John Musker; Ted Elliot; Terry Rossio; "Aladdin" from One Thousand and One Nights
- Produced by: Dan Lin; Jonathan Eirich
- Starring: Will Smith; Mena Massoud; Naomi Scott; Marwan Kenzari; Navid Negahban; Nasim Pedrad; Billy Magnussen; Stefan Kalipha
- Cinematography: Alan Stewart
- Edited by: James Herbert
- Music by: Alan Menken
- Production companies: Walt Disney Pictures; Rideback
- Distributed by: Walt Disney Studios; Motion Pictures
- Release dates: May 8, 2019 (Grand Rex); May 24, 2019 (United States)
- Running time: 128 minutes
- Country: United States
- Language: English
- Budget: $183 million
- Box office: $1.051 billion

Aladdin is a 2019 American musical fantasy film and a live-action adaptation of Disney's 1992 animated film, itself loosely based on the Middle-Eastern folk tale. Directed by Guy Ritchie and written by Ritchie and John August, the film stars Will Smith, Mena Massoud, Naomi Scott, Marwan Kenzari, Navid Negahban, Nasim Pedrad, and Billy Magnussen. The story follows an Arabian street urchin named Aladdin, who discovers a magic lamp containing a genie, with whose help he disguises himself as a wealthy prince and tries to impress the Sultan of Agrabah to win the heart of his free-spirited daughter, Princess Jasmine, as the Sultan's evil vizier and sorcerer, Jafar, plots to steal the magic lamp.

In October 2016, Disney announced Ritchie would direct a live-action remake of Aladdin. Smith was the first member of the cast to join, signing on to portray Genie in July 2017, and Massoud and Scott were confirmed for the other two lead roles later that month. Principal photography began that September at Longcross Studios in Surrey, England, and ended in January 2018. Filming also took place in the Wadi Rum Desert in Jordan. Additional filming and pick-ups took place in August 2018.

Aladdin premiered at the Grand Rex in Paris on May 8, 2019, and was theatrically released in the United States on May 24. The film received mixed reviews from critics and grossed over $1 billion worldwide, making it the ninth highest-grossing film of 2019. Amongst Disney's live-action remakes, the film is the eighth-most-expensive and third-highest-grossing to date.

== Plot ==
In the fictional city of Agrabah, (Note: The city is based on Baghdad.) an orphaned street urchin named Aladdin and his monkey, Abu, meet Princess Jasmine, who has snuck away from her sheltered life in the palace. She wishes to succeed her father as Sultan but is instead expected to marry one of her royal suitors. Jafar, the royal vizier, schemes to overthrow the Sultan and seeks a magic lamp from the Cave of Wonders, that only "the diamond in the rough" can retrieve.

While sneaking into the royal palace to visit Jasmine, Aladdin and Abu are captured by Jafar. He offers to make Aladdin rich enough to impress Jasmine in exchange for retrieving the lamp from the Cave of Wonders. Once there, Aladdin frees a magic carpet and finds the lamp. Aladdin gives the lamp to Jafar, who double-crosses him and kicks him and Abu back into the cave, but not before Abu steals the lamp back.

Trapped in the cave, Aladdin rubs the lamp, unwittingly summoning the omnipotent Genie inside, who has the power to grant three wishes to anyone who has the lamp. Aladdin gets them out of the cave without using a wish, on a technicality. Determined to woo Jasmine, he uses his official first wish to become a prince and promises to use his third wish to free the Genie from servitude and turn him human.

Aladdin makes an extravagant arrival at Agrabah as "Prince Ali of Ababwa", but he struggles to impress Jasmine. Posing as Aladdin's human attendant, the Genie is mutually smitten with Dalia, Jasmine's handmaiden. Aladdin and Jasmine bond when he takes her on a ride on the magic carpet. Tricked into revealing his true identity, he lies to her, saying that he actually is a prince and dressed like a peasant to explore Agrabah.

When Jafar discovers Aladdin's identity, he kidnaps Aladdin and throws him into the palace moat and into the sea, knowing that if he survives, it will prove that he has the lamp. The Genie rescues Aladdin, costing him his second wish. Once rescued, Aladdin returns to the palace and destroys Jafar's magic cobra staff, ending his spell over the Sultan and revealing his plot. Jafar is then arrested and imprisoned in the dungeons. The Sultan allows Aladdin to marry Jasmine. Aladdin goes back on his promise to free the Genie, feeling uncertain of being able to keep up his charade without him. Dismayed that his new friend will continue living a lie, the Genie retreats to the lamp.

Freed by his parrot sidekick Iago, Jafar steals the lamp and becomes the Genie's new master. He uses his first wish to become sultan and his second one to become the world's most powerful sorcerer. Jafar then exposes Aladdin, exiling him and Abu to a frozen wasteland, and tortures the Sultan and Dalia until Jasmine agrees to marry him. The Genie secretly teleports the magic carpet to rescue Aladdin and Abu behind Jafar's back. At the wedding, as Aladdin returns to Agrabah, Jasmine steals the lamp from Jafar and jumps onto the magic carpet. Jafar then uses a sand twister to recapture Aladdin and Jasmine and destroy the magic carpet.

As Jafar holds Jasmine, Dalia, and the Sultan under his magic, Aladdin taunts Jafar for being second in power to the Genie, goading him into using his last wish to become "the most powerful being in the universe". Jafar turns into a genie and becomes trapped inside his own lamp, dragging Iago with him, and the Genie banishes them to the Cave of Wonders. Abu rescues the magic carpet and Genie fixes it up. Jasmine, Dalia, and the Sultan are freed from Jafar's magic. The Genie encourages Aladdin to use his third wish to regain his royal title and legally marry Jasmine. Aladdin instead keeps his promise and frees the Genie by using his last wish, allowing him to live as a human. Dalia, the Genie, and the Sultan know that Jasmine loves Aladdin. The Sultan crowns Jasmine the new sultana-regnant, no longer bound to marry a prince, and she and Aladdin marry. Meanwhile, the Genie marries Dalia, and they start a family as they explore the world together.

== Cast ==
- Will Smith as Genie / Mariner, a comical and kindly jinn who has the power to grant three wishes to whoever possesses his magic lamp. Smith said that he was "terrified" while playing the character, but that "[he] found a lane that pays homage" to Robin Williams's performance in the original animated film, while still making the role "[his] own thing." Smith described the character as "both a trickster and a mentor," who tries "to guide Aladdin to the truth of the greatness that's already within him." Smith physically portrays the character when he is in the guise of a human, while his giant blue genie form is CGI, portrayed through motion-capture performance.
- Mena Massoud as Aladdin, an impoverished but kind-hearted Agrabah thief and street urchin who is in love with Princess Jasmine. Massoud said that Aladdin "sees a future for himself that's greater than what's been set out for him at the present moment. He doesn't know exactly what it is or how he's going to get there, but he knows it is out there," and felt the character is very selfless and usually does things for other people, but as he falls in love he loses himself a little bit and starts to become someone that he's not. But he's a good person with good intentions and has good people surrounding him who lead him back to where he's supposed to be.
- Naomi Scott as Jasmine, the beautiful princess of Agrabah and the daughter of the Sultan who wants to have a say in how she lives her life and falls in love with Aladdin. Scott said that the character "will be strong and have fun, but also get it wrong and be emotional. She's a multidimensional woman, and she does not have to just be one thing. So in this movie, you see her go on such a roller coaster, as opposed to her one goal being to escape the loneliness of royalty and find a companion." She further stated that Jasmine will try to find "the courage to speak out for her people," and said that "Jasmine wants to know what goes on in her kingdom and reconcile the distance that has been created, and Aladdin gives her the courage to do just that."
- Marwan Kenzari as Jafar, a nefarious, deceptive, power-hungry sorcerer and the grand vizier of Agrabah who, frustrated with the Sultan's ways of ruling, devises a dastardly plot to overthrow him as the ruler of Agrabah by acquiring the Genie's lamp. Jafar's backstory is explored in the film, which producer Jonathan Eirich felt would make the audience "understand why he's so bad," as "that's what makes him such a good villain."
- Navid Negahban as the Sultan, the wise and noble ruler of Agrabah who is eager to find a capable husband for his daughter Jasmine. On playing the character, Negahban said that it was "very scary because [the Sultan] has so many followers. Lots of people grew up with that character, so they have certain expectations. It's not just an animated character. This has become a real personality, a real persona.
- Nasim Pedrad as Dalia, Jasmine's handmaiden and confidante. Pedrad said that Dalia has "been by Jasmine's side for years and really looks out for her".
- Numan Acar as Hakim, the head of the palace guards who is loyal to the Sultan of Agrabah.
- Billy Magnussen as Prince Anders, a suitor and potential husband for Jasmine from the kingdom of Skånland.
- Alan Tudyk as the voice of Iago, Jafar's sardonic and intelligent scarlet macaw companion. This is the first instance where the character is not voiced by Gilbert Gottfried. In this film, Iago is portrayed as a more realistic parrot.
- Frank Welker, the only voice actor from the original film, would reprise his role as the voices of Abu, Aladdin's kleptomaniac but loyal pet Tufted capuchin; Rajah, Jasmine's loving pet Bengal tiger; and the Cave of Wonders, a sand guardian who guards the magic lamp from intruders and only gives it to someone who's worthy, "a diamond in the rough". Out of the three roles the latter is the only one for which he receives credit.
- Stefan Kalipha as Imam.

Additionally, Taliyah Blair and Jordan A. Nash respectively play Genie and Dalia's daughter and son, Lian and Omar. Also, Robby Haynes portrays Razoul, a palace guard. Nina Wadia plays Zulla, a market trader who dislikes Aladdin. Wadia describes her appearance as "more of a cameo" as extra footage was needed after filming had wrapped.

== Production ==
=== Development ===
On October 10, 2016, it was announced that Guy Ritchie would direct a live-action Aladdin film for Walt Disney Pictures, with John August writing the script and Dan Lin and Jonathan Eirich attached as producers. The studio said that the film would be "an ambitious and nontraditional" take on the tale of Aladdin that would keep the musical elements of the original film. On the nontraditional aspect, the studio had originally planned for the film to be told in a nonlinear format.

On July 17, 2017, it was announced that Disney had hired Vanessa Taylor to polish the original screenplay by August, specifically some "character work" and what is called "script doctoring". Meanwhile, Richie and the studio focused on casting the other main roles with filming slated to start in August in London.

When asked about Ritchie's take on the film, Pasek & Paul described it as "very muscular and action-packed."

=== Casting ===
In February 2017, Lin said that they were looking for a diverse cast and that they would not try "to make Prince of Persia". A worldwide casting call for the lead roles of Aladdin and Princess Jasmine commenced in March 2017, with principal production set to take place in the UK from July 2017 until January 2018. The call for the titular role included both South Asian and Southwest Asian (Arab) actors, which some critics suggested was "a simplistic conflation" that signaled "an ignorance offensive to both cultures". On April 19, 2017, it was reported that Will Smith was in talks to play Genie, for which was confirmed in July. In August, Dutch actor Marwan Kenzari joined the cast as Jafar, with Nasim Pedrad cast in a newly created role as Dalia, "a hand maid and friend of Jasmine" who serves as a "comic relief". Numan Acar was set to play Hakim. The following month, Billy Magnussen joined the cast in a newly created role as Prince Anders, alongside Navid Negahban as the Sultan.

In May 2017, Little Mix member Jade Thirlwall was in talks for the part of Princess Jasmine. On July 11, 2017, it was announced that principal production on Aladdin had been pushed back by a month, to August 2017, due to struggles in finding the right actor to portray the titular role. Over 2,000 actors and actresses had auditioned for the roles of Aladdin and Jasmine, but finding a male lead of Middle Eastern or Indian descent in his 20s who could act and sing was seemingly difficult for the producers. Naomi Scott and Tara Sutaria were the final two actresses in the running for the role of Jasmine, but neither could be cast until a chemistry test was done with whoever would be cast as Aladdin. The studio was initially interested in Dev Patel or Riz Ahmed for Aladdin, but later decided to cast a relative newcomer. Achraf Koutet, Mena Massoud and George Kosturos were among the actors being tested for the role. Two musical film veterans, Marc Platt (who would serve as executive producer) and Chris Montan, were consulted before a final decision was made.

At the 2017 D23 Expo, on July 15, it was announced that Massoud would star as Aladdin and Scott as Jasmine, ending the four-month long open casting call. Julie Ann Crommett, Disney's Vice President of Multicultural Engagement, said the decision to cast Scott—the daughter of an English father and a Gujarati Ugandan-Indian mother—as Jasmine, reflected the mixing or association of different cultures in the broad region that consists of the Middle East, South Asia, and China, all of which make up the Silk Road.

On December 20, 2018, Gilbert Gottfried said that he was not asked to reprise his role as Iago, Jafar's pet parrot. In March 2019, it was announced that Alan Tudyk would voice the character instead. In May 2019, Welker was announced as reprising his role as Rajah, Jasmine's pet tiger, and the trailer had confirmed that Welker would reprise his role as the Cave of Wonders as well.

=== Filming ===
Principal photography began on September 6, 2017, at Longcross Studios in Surrey, England, and wrapped on January 24, 2018. Additional filming also took place at Arborfield Studios in Berkshire, England. Part of the film was shot in Wadi Rum Desert, Jordan. The Royal Film Commission provided support to the production during filming and assisted in facilitating logistics. Reshoots took place during August 2018. The film's production sets were designed by Game of Thrones production designer Gemma Jackson. The "Prince Ali" musical sequence features 1,000 dancers and extras. Smith frequently improvises throughout the film. Massoud also revealed that there was a whole scene, where Prince Ali and Genie meet the royal family for the first time, that was improvised by the cast.

=== Visual effects ===
The visual effects were provided by Industrial Light & Magic and supervised by Michael Mullholland, Daniele Bigi, and David Seager, with the help of Hybride Technologies, DNEG, Nvizage and Proof.

=== Controversies ===
In January 2018, it was reported that brown makeup was being applied to white extras during filming in order to "blend in", which caused an outcry and condemnation among fans and critics, branding the practice as "an insult to the whole industry" while accusing the producers of not recruiting people with Middle Eastern or North African heritage. Disney responded to the controversy saying, "Diversity of our cast and background performers was a requirement and only in a handful of instances when it was a matter of specialty skills, safety and control (special effects rigs, stunt performers and handling of animals) were crew made up to blend in." In addition to this, Disney faced backlash for casting Naomi Scott, a non-Arab actress, in the role of Princess Jasmine. Some critics argued that this decision reflected a lack of authentic representation and suggested that Disney viewed women of Middle Eastern and Indian heritage as interchangeable.

The decision to cast Billy Magnussen as an entirely new character not seen in the original film also drew criticism from fans. Some viewed the creation of his character as unnecessary, while others accused the film of whitewashing, since Magnussen is White. However, The Washington Post pointed out that Nasim Pedrad, an actress of Iranian-American descent, also was cast as a brand new character when she was awarded the role of Jasmine's friend Mara (later renamed Dalia).

=== Music and soundtrack ===
Alan Menken was brought in to compose the score for the film, reprising his duties from the original animated film. Pasek & Paul wrote a new song with Menken, and several songs from the original film by Menken, Howard Ashman, and Tim Rice were featured in the remake.

== Release ==
Aladdin held its world premiere at the Grand Rex in Paris, France, on May 8, 2019. It was released by Walt Disney Studios Motion Pictures on May 24, 2019, switching its original release date with Star Wars: The Rise of Skywalker. The film was originally going to be released on December 20, 2019. But on September 12, 2017, the film was moved to May 24, 2019.

Aladdin's first regional premiere was in Jordan on May 13, 2019, in the presence of Prince Ali bin Hussein and Princess Rym Ali.

=== Marketing ===
Will Smith debuted the first official poster on October 10, 2018. The teaser trailer was released the following day. In December 2018, Entertainment Weekly offered a first official look at the cast in costume on the cover of their issue for the most anticipated films of 2019. On February 10, 2019, Disney debuted a special sneak peek of the film during the 61st Annual Grammy Awards, which was met with largely negative feedback from audiences, primarily due to the quality of the CGI Genie in his blue design, created via motion capture effects. The negative reception sparked a large amount of memes and Photoshop edits mocking Will Smith's appearance in the sneak peek, several of which compared it with Tobias Fünke (from Arrested Development) painted in blue in an attempt to join the Blue Man Group. On March 12, 2019, Disney debuted a second trailer on Good Morning America. The trailer had a much more positive reception than the previous one, as it featured several songs from the original film and more of Smith not entirely in motion-capture. His CGI scenes received better notices, as well, although it was still mostly criticized by some critics when the film was released.

=== Novelization ===
A tie-in novelization of the film was published by Disney Publishing Worldwide on April 9, 2019.

=== Home media ===
Aladdin was released in Digital HD for download and streaming on August 27, 2019, and was released on Ultra HD Blu-ray, Blu-ray, and DVD on September 10.

Aladdin made its streaming debut on Disney+ on January 8, 2020. With the launch of Disney+ Hotstar on April 3, 2020; it was released in India in Hindi, Tamil, and Telugu as well as the original English.

As of 22 April 2020, the film had earned $345 million from worldwide home entertainment and television net revenues, bringing total box office and home entertainment revenue to $1.396 billion.

== Reception ==
=== Box office ===
Aladdin grossed $356.6 million in the United States and Canada, and $695.1 million in other territories, for a worldwide total of $1.051 billion, against a production budget of $183 million. It was the ninth-highest-grossing film of 2019. The film crossed the $1 billion mark on July 26, 2019, becoming the 41st film to reach the milestone. Deadline Hollywood calculated the net profit of the film to be $356 million, when factoring together all expenses and revenues.

In the United States and Canada, Aladdin was released alongside Booksmart and Brightburn, and was projected to gross around $80 million from 4,476 theaters over its four-day opening weekend over Memorial Day. While Disney was projecting a $75–85 million debut, some independent trackers had the film opening to as low as $65 million or as high as $100 million. The film made $31 million on its first day, including $7 million from Thursday night previews, the second-best total of the Disney live action remakes. The film ended up overperforming, grossing $91.5 million in its three-day opening weekend, and $116.8 million over four days during the extended Memorial Day frame. It was the third biggest opening of 2019 at the time (behind Avengers: Endgame and Captain Marvel), and the fifth-highest Memorial Day launch ever, as well as the best debut of Ritchie's career and second best of Smith's. The film then grossed $11.9 million on its fifth day, the biggest post-Memorial Day Tuesday ever. In its second weekend, the film made $42.3 million, finishing second, behind newcomer Godzilla: King of the Monsters, and then made $24.7 million in its third weekend, finishing third. It retained the third-place position at the box office during its fourth and fifth weekends with $17.3 million and $13.2 million, respectively. Aladdin ended its box office run as the eighth highest-grossing film of 2019 in the U.S. and Canada.

Worldwide, the film was expected to open to an additional $100–120 million, including $10–20 million in China. It went on to gross $123.2 million from foreign territories in its three-day opening weekend, for an overall global debut of $214.7 million. It was the number-one film in every Latin American and Asian territory where it was released. Its biggest international openings were in China ($18.7 million), Mexico ($9.2 million), the United Kingdom ($8.4 million), Italy ($6.6 million), and South Korea ($6.5 million). It also won the second best opening of 2019 in Italy, Spain, Indonesia, and Vietnam. In India, it debuted with ₹220 million (US$2.4 million), the year's third best opening for a foreign film (behind Avengers: Endgame and Captain Marvel). By Monday, the film had a global four-day launch of $255 million. In its second weekend of international release the film made $78.3 million from 54 countries, remaining number one in 32 of them. In its fourth international weekend, Aladdin remained number one in twenty countries. By the end of June 2019, the film surpassed Independence Day (1996) to become the highest-grossing film of Will Smith's career worldwide. It would also surpass the domestic record previously held by Suicide Squad (2016). As of 19 August 2019, the film's top five international markets are Japan ($110.1 million), South Korea ($90.4 million), China ($53.5 million), the United Kingdom ($46.4 million), and Mexico ($32.5 million).

It topped the UK box office for four weeks. In the Middle East, it had the best Ramadan opening ever in the United Arab Emirates and Jordan and went on to become the highest-grossing release of all time in the Middle East. In Japan, the film debuted with $12.9 million, the year's highest opening weekend for a foreign film, surpassing Avengers: Endgame. As of September 2019, it is the year's second highest-grossing film in Japan (behind Weathering with You), and one of the top 20 highest-grossing films ever in Japan. In South Korea, it grossed over $82 million from over 11.4 million ticket sales as of July 2019, making it the year's third highest-grossing film and second highest-grossing foreign film in South Korea, as well as the third highest-grossing foreign film ever in South Korea and the highest grossing Disney film ever (not including the MCU) in the country.

=== Critical response ===
On the review aggregation website Rotten Tomatoes, the film holds an approval rating of 57% based on 383 reviews with an average rating of 5.9/10. The site's critical consensus reads, "Aladdin retells its classic source material's story with sufficient spectacle and skill, even if it never approaches the dazzling splendor of the animated original." On Metacritic, the film has a weighted average score of 53 out of 100 based on 50 critics, indicating "mixed or average" reviews. Audiences polled by CinemaScore gave the film an average grade of "A" on an A+ to F scale, while those at PostTrak gave it an overall positive score of 90% (with an average 4.5 stars out of 5) and a 70% "definite recommend".

Writing for the Chicago Sun-Times, Richard Roeper gave the film 3 out of 4 stars, praising Smith, Scott, and Massoud's performances and calling it a "shining, shimmering live-action update." Variety's Peter Debruge summarized his review with, "Will Smith steps into Robin Williams's shoes, bringing fresh attitude to the role of the Genie in Guy Ritchie's high-risk, mostly rewarding live-action remake." However, he criticized Kenzari's performance as Jafar, saying: "Dutch actor Marwan Kenzari may be a handsome alternative to the animated version's effete vizier, with his pencil moustache and Sophia Loren eyes, but he no longer looms large enough to feel like much of a threat." A Mir Fantastiki review by Yevgeniy Peklo gave the film a score of 8/10, saying it was "probably the best Disney live-action remake up to date."

Despite praising the cast, William Bibbiani of TheWrap said of the film, "If you don't think about it very hard (although you probably should), the remake of Aladdin might entertain you. But you'd be a heck of a lot more entertained by watching the original film again. Or by going to a real-life parade. Or by doing some light gardening. Or by doing a crossword puzzle." Chris Nashawaty of Entertainment Weekly gave the film a C+, lamenting that it did not add anything new to its 1992 animated predecessor; he felt that the film was unable to update the original's questionable Middle Eastern characterizations but nevertheless praised Smith's and Scott's performances. Mark Kennedy of the Associated Press wrote that, "Guy Ritchie... was always an odd choice to helm a big Disney romantic musical and proves utterly the wrong guy here. Aladdin, in his hands, is more like The Mummy than Frozen."

Before filming had started, some commentators criticized racial politics implied by the film's production elements and plot. Some expressed skepticism after the casting process about its conflation of Arab and Middle Eastern culture and "lack of specificity and care". In a review in 7iber, Lamees Assaf observed that "the people and the setting looked more like India than a city in the Middle East." She also critiqued gendered and orientalist stereotypes as reified by the film, writing that "[i]n the eyes of Disney and Hollywood, the stereotypical image of the Arab girl– the belly dancer with a small waist and long hair– and the dark-skinned, jealous, and chivalrous Arab man defending and protecting his women from harm's way, is much more attractive than actual Arabs, who are truly boring in reality."

=== Accolades ===
Award	Date of ceremony	Category	Recipient(s)	Result	Ref(s)
Teen Choice Awards	August 11, 2019	Choice Movie – Sci-Fi/Fantasy	Aladdin	Won	
Teen Choice Awards	August 11, 2019	Choice Sci-Fi/Fantasy Movie Actor	Will Smith	Won	
Teen Choice Awards	August 11, 2019	Choice Sci-Fi/Fantasy Movie Actor	Mena Massoud	Nominated	
Teen Choice Awards	August 11, 2019	Choice Sci-Fi/Fantasy Movie Actress	Naomi Scott	Won	
Teen Choice Awards	August 11, 2019	Choice Movie Villain	Marwan Kenzari	Nominated	
Teen Choice Awards	August 11, 2019	Choice Song From A Movie	"A Whole New World" (End Title)	Won	
Saturn Awards	September 13, 2019	Best Fantasy Film	Aladdin	Nominated	
Saturn Awards	September 13, 2019	Best Supporting Actor	Will Smith	Nominated	
Saturn Awards	September 13, 2019	Best Supporting Actress	Naomi Scott	Nominated	
Saturn Awards	September 13, 2019	Best Director	Guy Ritchie	Nominated	
Saturn Awards	September 13, 2019	Best Production Design	Gemma Jackson	Nominated	
Saturn Awards	September 13, 2019	Best Editing	James Herbert	Nominated	
Saturn Awards	September 13, 2019	Best Music	Alan Menken	Nominated	
Saturn Awards	September 13, 2019	Best Costume Design	Michael Wilkinson	Won	
Saturn Awards	September 13, 2019	Best Special Effects	Aladdin	Nominated	
People's Choice Awards	November 10, 2019	The Family Movie of 2019	Aladdin	Won	
People's Choice Awards	November 10, 2019	The Male Movie Star of 2019	Will Smith	Nominated	
Hollywood Music in Media Awards	November 20, 2019	Best Original Song – Feature Film	"Speechless" – Alan Menken, Benj Pasek and Justin Paul	Nominated	
National Film & TV Awards	December 3, 2019	Best Actor	Will Smith	Nominated	
National Film & TV Awards	December 3, 2019	Best Actor	Mena Massoud	Nominated	
National Film & TV Awards	December 3, 2019	Best Newcomer	Mena Massoud	Nominated	
National Film & TV Awards	December 3, 2019	Best Actress	Naomi Scott	Nominated	
National Film & TV Awards	December 3, 2019	Best Supporting Actress	Naomi Scott	Nominated	
National Film & TV Awards	December 3, 2019	Best Director	Guy Ritchie	Nominated	
Austin Film Critics Association	January 6, 2020	Best Motion Capture/Special Effects Performance	Will Smith	Nominated	
Critics Choice Awards	January 12, 2020	Best Song	"Speechless" – Alan Menken, Benj Pasek and Justin Paul	Nominated	
Costume Designers Guild Awards	January 28, 2020	Excellence in Sci-Fi/Fantasy Film	Michael Wilkinson	Nominated	
Visual Effects Society Awards	January 29, 2020	Outstanding Created Environment in a Photoreal Feature	Daniel Schmid, Falk Boje, Stanislaw Marek, Kevin George ("for Agrabah")	Nominated	
Visual Effects Society Awards	January 29, 2020	Outstanding Special (Practical) Effects in a Photoreal or Animated Project	Mark Holt, Jay Mallet, Will Wyatt, Dickon Mitchell (for "Magic Carpet")	Nominated	
Art Directors Guild Awards	February 1, 2020	Excellence in Production Design for a Fantasy Film	Gemma Jackson	Nominated	
Golden Raspberry Awards	March 16, 2020	Razzie Redeemer Award	Will Smith	Nominated	
Billboard Music Awards	October 14, 2020	Top Soundtrack	Aladdin	Nominated	

"Speechless", a new original song written for Jasmine, was shortlisted for the Academy Award for Best Original Song at the 92nd Academy Awards, but was ultimately not nominated.

== Future ==
=== Sequel ===
On August 12, 2019, producer Lin announced his enthusiasm for a sequel and revealed that Disney is in the early stages of developing a follow-up. The studio also hopes to bring back Ritchie to direct and Smith to reprise his role as the Genie while also telling a story that's "fresh and new". He later stated that if they would make a sequel to Aladdin, it would not be a direct adaptation of the animated films The Return of Jafar or Aladdin and the King of Thieves but could borrow elements of them. It was also said that they would look at various sources for the sequel's story.

On February 12, 2020, Variety confirmed that a sequel is in development, with John Gatins and Andrea Berloff set to write the script. Lin and Eirich were set to return as producers, and Massoud, Smith, and Scott were expected to reprise their roles. Aladdin 2 was announced once the producers decided they had a good story and knew their path ahead. In January 2023, it was revealed that Smith was still set to return as the Genie in spite of the incident where he slapped Chris Rock at the Academy Awards event in 2022. Furthermore, he was reportedly expected to have a bigger role in the sequel. However, Massoud later said that it was "very unlikely at this point" on Twitter on March 14. This led to rumors that the sequel had been cancelled. The subject would be brought up again on May 13, 2023, when Massoud responded to a Twitter post from The Hollywood Handle about the box office projections for Disney's live-action remake of The Little Mermaid (which also involved Marc Platt as a producer), by saying that it won't reach the $1 billion mark like Aladdin did, but that it "undoubtedly will get a sequel," explaining that "Our film was unique in that audiences went to watch it multiple times." His response received backlash, resulting in Massoud deactivating his Twitter account. However, he would end up getting part of his prediction right, as The Little Mermaid failed to reach $1 billion at the box office. It was speculated that his words may have also come from his frustrations over the struggle of Disney developing the Aladdin sequel. On December 15, 2023, Massoud said "I don't have any updates" about the sequel. He also said that he thinks the Hollywood artists' strike may have stalled the project but, with the strike over, he is now waiting for further news. Unsure if the sequel will be made, he also said, "For me, at a certain point, life goes on."

=== Spin-off film ===
A spin-off film focused on Prince Anders was announced in December 2019 to be in development for Disney+ with Jordan Dunn and Michael Kvamme writing the script and Magnussen reprising his role. In April 2021, Magnussen stated that project was still in development and that writers Shane Andries and Chris Smith had been hired to do additional work on the script. In May 2022, Magnussen once again said that the film is still in the works and going through rewrites. In August 2024, Magnussen gave an update on the project saying, "The pandemic happened when we were really putting it together. There were a few changes with a few companies. It's not dead. Every day is creating these beautiful stories. In my career, I just like doing fun stuff. What would I want to see and what would I want to hang out and do? So no, it's not dead. It's still going."
