= List of Disney's Aladdin characters =

The main characters in the first film. From top left to right: Magic Carpet and Genie. From bottom left to right: The Sultan, Jasmine, Aladdin, Abu, Iago, and Jafar.

The following is a list of characters that appear in Disney's Aladdin franchise, including the 1992 film, its direct-to-video sequels The Return of Jafar and Aladdin and the King of Thieves, the television series, the live-action adaptation, and other spin-off projects.

== Introduced in Aladdin ==
=== Abu ===
Abu (vocal effects provided by Frank Welker) is Aladdin's kleptomaniac pet monkey. In Aladdin: The Series, he is a voice of dissent whenever he is dragged into Iago's schemes, though, over time, they go from enemies to friends after Iago's reformation. Abu was created by Disney employee Joe Grant, with animators filming monkeys at the San Francisco Zoo to study his movements. He is based on the thief of the same name from The Thief of Bagdad.

In other media, Abu appears in the Kingdom Hearts video game franchise, the animated television series House of Mouse, and the mobile game Disney Heroes: Battle Mode.

In the 2019 film, Abu is depicted as a tufted capuchin.

=== Magic Carpet ===
The Magic Carpet is a sentient carpet that Aladdin finds in the Cave of Wonders' treasure room. It does not speak, instead expressing itself through pantomime and movements, as well as using its tassels as limbs. Though genderless, it is referred to with male pronouns due to the Arabic language using masculine pronouns by default.

Carpet's design was maintained through CGI. Advances in CGI had progressed since the ballroom sequence in Beauty and the Beast, making it easier to animate Carpet's texture and pattern regardless of which way it moved. Animator Randy Cartwright refused to resort to the anthropomorphic style of putting a face on a carpet, instead using body language to make Carpet more flexible and almost human. Computer artist Tina Price took Cartwright's outlined form and superimposed the Persian design, which could stretch, squash, and roll up without changing. According to film critic Leonard Maltin, this made Carpet's animation one of the best collaborations between traditional and technologically advanced animation to date.

It appears in the TV series, as well as in cameo appearances in The Hunchback of Notre Dame and The Princess and the Frog.

It also appears in Kingdom Hearts in the world of Agrabah, acting as transport between the city of Agrabah and the Cave of Wonders after Sora frees it.

Carpet appears in the 2019 film.

Several Disney rides have been based on Carpet: The Magic Carpets of Aladdin at Adventureland in Walt Disney World's Magic Kingdom, which simulates flight on a carpet, Flying Carpets Over Agrabah at Toon Studio in Walt Disney Studios Park in France, and Jasmine's Flying Carpets at Arabian Coast in Tokyo DisneySea.

=== The Sultan ===
Sultan
- First appearance: Aladdin (1992)
- Portrayed by: Navid Negahban (2019 film)
- Voiced by: Douglas Seale (first film); Val Bettin (sequels and TV series); Jeff Bennett (Disney Princess Enchanted Tales: Follow Your Dreams)
- Gender: Male
- Title: Sultan
- Family: A deceased wife (confirmed); Jasmine (daughter)
- Relatives: Aladdin (son-in-law)
- Nationality: Agrabah

The Sultan is Princess Jasmine's father and the pompous but kind ruler of Agrabah. Some aspects of the character were inspired by the Wizard of Oz, to create a bumbling authority figure.

In the 2019 film, the Sultan's personality is more serious compared to his animated counterpart, but retains the original's kind and benevolent nature. His wife comes from the kingdom of Shirabad, which Jafar sought to conquer, and was murdered prior to the events of the film, causing him to keep Jasmine inside the palace to protect her. At the end of the film, he steps down from his position as the Sultan and passes it on to Jasmine.

=== Royal Guards ===
Razoul, Fazal, Hakim and Nahbi
- First appearance: Aladdin (1992)
- Voiced by: Razoul: Jim Cummings, Robby Haynes (2019 film); Fazal: Frank Welker; Jim Cummings (in "Sneeze the Day"); Hakim: Frank Welker (in the TV series); Jim Cummings (in "Sneeze the Day"); Corey Burton (in Aladdin and the King of Thieves); Numan Acar (2019 film); Nahbi: Frank Welker
- Alias: The Royal Guards

The Royal Guards serve as law enforcement, patrolling the palace and the streets of Agrabah.

==== Razoul ====
Razoul (voiced by Jim Cummings) is the Captain of the Royal Guards of Agrabah in the films and the TV series. He is named for layout supervisor Rasoul Azadani. He dislikes Aladdin because of all the trouble he has caused for the guards, but is loyal to the Sultan and Jasmine and takes his job seriously.

In the 2019 film, Razoul is portrayed by Robby Haynes and has a reduced role as a chief city guard, with most of his role in the story being taken by Hakim.

==== Fazal ====
Fazal (voiced by the late Jack Angel in the first film, Frank Welker in the sequels and the TV series, understudied by Jim Cummings in "Sneeze the Day") is a big fat guard and one of Razoul's lieutenants.

==== Hakim ====
Hakim (voiced by Patrick Pinney in the first film, Corey Burton in the third film, Frank Welker in the TV series, Jim Cummings in "Sneeze the Day", portrayed by Numan Acar in the live-action film) is a thin guard who is one of Razoul's lieutenants.

In the 2019 film, Hakim is depicted as the head of the guards and Jafar's right-hand man, who worked for the Sultan while playing a similar role to Razoul. He redeems himself by the end of the film.

==== Nahbi ====
Nahbi (voiced by Frank Welker in the TV series, Jeff Bennett in the third film) is a short guard who is one of Razoul's lieutenants.

=== Rajah ===
Rajah (vocal effects by Frank Welker) is Jasmine's pet Bengal tiger who displays dog and cat-like behavior. Unlike Abu, he is not anthropomorphized, but can understand human language and emotions.

Rajah also appears in Ralph Breaks the Internet.

In the 2019 film, he bonds with Aladdin when he is in his Prince Ali disguise and is later imprisoned along with the guards. After Jafar is defeated, he is present at Aladdin and Jasmine's wedding.

=== The Peddler ===
The Peddler (voiced by the late Robin Williams; singing voice provided by Bruce Adler) is a mysterious desert-faring merchant who appears at the beginning of the original film and in the ending of Aladdin and the King of Thieves. The Peddler scene was improvised by Williams, who was put in front of a table with props and began pitching them as products from a salesman's catalogue. Originally, the Peddler was intended to be the Genie, either masquerading as a human or having been turned into a human, but this was cut from the final film. Despite this, the directors of the film later revealed that the Peddler is still the Genie.

The Peddler is seen at the end of Aladdin and the King of Thieves singing the epilogue as Aladdin and Jasmine pass him to see Cassim and Iago off.

He also appears in Disney's Aladdin, selling extra lives and wishes to the player, and in the Kingdom Hearts series, where he is voiced by Corey Burton.

In the 2019 film, the Peddler is the human form that Genie assumes after being freed from Aladdin's service.

=== Cave of Wonders Guardian ===
The Cave of Wonders Guardian (voiced by Frank Welker) is a giant head of a tiger made of sand and the guardian of the Cave of Wonders, who is awakened through the Scarab Medallion. Its job is to protect the Genie's lamp and give it to those who are worthy while eliminating those who are not. The treasures hoarded inside the cave are used to test those who are worthy to enter, as touching them will cause the Tiger God to eliminate them. It was portrayed by computer-generated imagery, following reference drawings by animator Eric Goldberg.

After Jafar and Gazeem obtain both halves of the Scarab Medallion, it guides them to where the Cave of Wonders is. There, they awaken it and tells Gazeem that only a "Diamond in the Rough" to enter. However, Jafar fails to understand this and it kills Gazeem after attempting to enter the Cave at Jafar's instruction. Afterwards, it returns to its slumber, causing the Scarab Medallion halves to return to normal, but not before advising Jafar to search for a Diamond in the Rough. Jafar later reawakens the Tiger God, who has brought Aladdin and Abu with him, and allows Aladdin to enter since he is a Diamond in the Rough. After Abu touches a treasure near the lamp, they get trapped in the Cave after the Magic Carpet saves them from the hazards and the Tiger God returns to its slumber. Aladdin later tricks Genie into getting them out.

In the remake, the cave has a lion head-shaped stone entrance, rather than a tiger head rising from the sands, and does not move, except when swallowing unwanted visitors.

=== Gazeem ===
Gazeem (voiced by Charlie Adler) is Jafar's criminal minion, who retrieves the other half of the Scarab Medallion, but refuses to hand it over until Jafar gives him his reward. Once they locate the Cave of Wonders, Jafar has him retrieve the lamp from the cave and lets him have the rest of the treasures. However, the Tiger God refuses to allow him to enter, as he is not a "Diamond in the Rough". Despite this, Jafar urges Gazeem to enter the cave and the Tiger God kills him. Having lost his accomplice, Jafar sets out to find another man to enter the cave.

In the Aladdin video game, Gazeem is the first boss fought, dropping half of the Scarab Medallion necessary for Aladdin to enter the Cave of Wonders.

=== Prince Achmed ===
Prince Achmed (voiced by Corey Burton) is one of the potential suitors for Princess Jasmine. After Aladdin and Abu give their stolen bread to a sister and her younger brother, the brother runs out in front of Achmed's horse as Achmed is heading to the palace and she runs after him. After she runs in front of his carriage, Aladdin intervenes and insults Achmed. In retaliation, Achmed shoves Aladdin into a mud puddle and tells him that he is nothing but a "worthless street rat". The next day, he leaves the palace after Rajah attacks him and is no longer interested in Jasmine.

In the 2019 film, Achmed is replaced with Anders (portrayed by Billy Magnussen), the prince of Skånland. His role in the story is assumed by an unnamed castle horseman.

=== Farouk ===
Farouk (voiced by Jim Cummings) is a merchant who runs a fruit stand. When he sees Jasmine giving an apple to a hungry boy without paying, he attempts to cut off her right hand, but Aladdin stops him by claiming that Jasmine is his mentally handicapped sister. Farouk is initially willing to accept this and let them go, but realizes that he has been tricked after seeing that Abu has stolen some of his apples. However, Aladdin and Jasmine leave before he can catch them.

Farouk also appears during "Prince Ali" and in the TV series.

In the 2019 film, Farouk is replaced with the bread vendor Jamal (portrayed by Amir Boutrous). He is portrayed as a bread seller and attempts to take Jasmine's bracelet by force when she gives some of his bread to a hungry child.

=== Omar ===
Omar (voiced by Charlie Adler in the first film, Dan Castellaneta in the second film, Rob Paulsen in the TV series) is a merchant who sells watermelons and who Aladdin and Abu attempt to steal from.

== Introduced in The Return of Jafar ==
=== Abis Mal ===
Abis Mal (voiced by Jason Alexander) is a childish and incompetent thief with aspirations of wealth who does anything he can to get money. His first banter with Aladdin causes him to become a determined enemy towards him. He also appears in the TV series, where his villainous deeds revolve around power, as well as riches, and involve the use of magical artifacts or legendary creatures. His name is a play on the word "abysmal". He has a distant ancestor, Abnor Mal.

==== Abis Mal's Thugs ====
Abis Mal's Thugs (voiced by Jeff Bennett, Dan Castellaneta, Jim Cummings, Rob Paulsen, and Frank Welker) are various unnamed thieves who follow Abis Mal. They first appear in The Return of Jafar, where they are shown to resent his leadership and attempt to kill him at a well before being scared off by Jafar. The thugs also appear in the TV series, where their involvement with Abis Mal is more limited, though they are more often seen at the Skull and Dagger, the cafe headquarters of Agrabah's guild for thieves and criminals, often referred to by Abis Mal himself as a "den of thieves".

== Introduced in the TV series ==
=== Amin Damoola ===
Amin Damoola (voiced by Jeff Bennett) is a clumsy, cowardly, and incompetent thief, who is nicknamed "Butterfingers" by his fellow criminals due to his incompetence and attempts to cause trouble for Aladdin.

=== Arbutus ===
Arbutus (voiced by Ron Perlman) is a sorcerer with the ability to manipulate plants, who views most humans as enemies for killing plants. He values art and the concept of 'living beauty' and sees himself as an artist, using plants to create something beautiful, even in battle. In the past, a younger Sultan came to Arbutus's garden to pick a flower for his bride; though he was enraged by this, he let the Sultan go in exchange for receiving his most previous treasure in twenty years. Twenty years later, Arbutus comes to Agrabah to fulfill this deal and receive the Sultan's most precious treasure — Jasmine. Despite holding her captive, he befriends her due to her kindness and appreciation of his artwork. After the rose on his lapel is cut off, Arbutus withers and dies along with the garden he created.

=== Ayam Aghoul ===
Ayam Aghoul (voiced by Hamilton Camp) is an undead sorcerer who is from the Netherworld, in which he often escapes from and seeks to trap Aladdin and his friends in the realm of the dead. Also known as the Duke of the Dead, he makes use of various evil magics, demons, and undead servants, and as well as explosive skulls, which he often uses to throw at his enemies. In the episode "As the Netherworld Turns", he is shown to have a demon dog named Joel.

=== Aziz ===
Aziz (voiced by Michael Bell) is a small man who is later turned into a goblin-like creature, and is one of Aladdin's first adversaries in the show. As a human, he was part of a small traveling circus along with his former friends Minos and Fatima. He styled himself as an escape artist, which he was not successful at, and a firewalker, in which he uses his deception to trick people into believing.

After his transformation, Aziz can use his breath for almost anything, such as attacks, creating illusions, and transforming people into slug-like creatures. However, it is implied that his powers come at a price, as he seems to have a short breath and eventually catches on fire.

=== Chaos ===
Chaos (voiced by Matt Frewer) is a mischievous and cunning winged blue cat who possesses powerful magic and desires that life be unpredictable, as he finds order to be boring. He loves pranks and dislikes fate and being given orders. Despite how dangerous he can be, Chaos leans towards good rather than evil, as he intends his pranks to be exciting and fun rather than malicious.

As one of the most powerful beings, Chaos can grant his own wishes without any rules or limitations (with the exception of Fate, who is implied to be stronger than him), as well as several magical acts. He is also implied to be a mind-reader, as he was fully aware of the reason Mirage sent him to Agrabah and was for the most part teaching her a lesson.

=== Eden ===
Eden (voiced by Valery Pappas) is a genie who is Genie's girlfriend. She makes her debut in the episode "Some Enchanted Genie", in which, after being inside a bottle for 2,000 years, she is reawakened after her bottle is discovered by a young and optimistic orphan girl named Dhandi (voiced by Debi Derryberry), who becomes her friend and mistress.

Eden is kind and caring, but can sometimes be impulsive and easily angered when someone threatens her friends or her boyfriend. She also seems to prefer to cheat on the wishes of her master to improve or otherwise twist them to make the wishes work her way. After Dhandi accidentally wishes that she and Eden would always be together, which results in Eden staying with Dhandi until her life ends, Eden and Genie agree to postpone their romance and wait until the time comes, although in her second appearance, "The Book of Khartoum", the two genies reunite for their anniversary.

=== Fasir ===
Fasir (voiced by Ed Gilbert) is an old seer and powerful sorcerer who, by hiding his cycloptic nature, wears a bandage over his eye to appear as a blind beggar. He was the brother of the evil giant Fashoom, whom he turned to stone centuries ago for causing destruction by shooting fire with his eye while stealing treasures from caravans. It is implied that he and Mirage were previously acquaintances and lovers.

Throughout the series, Fasir serves as an ally to Aladdin and his friends, and helps them in a number of episodes.

=== Hamed ===
Hamed (voiced by Val Bettin) is a nomad and ancestor of the Sultan and Jasmine, who, thousands of years ago, founded the city of Agrabah.

=== Haroud Hazi Bin ===
Haroud Hazi Bin (voiced by James Avery) is Abis Mal's sarcastic and cynical right-hand henchman who often considers his boss' schemes ill-conceived. Despite this, he aids in Mal's plans more regularly than the rest of his men.

=== Mechanicles ===
Mechanicles (voiced by Charlie Adler) is a Greek mad scientist who considers himself to be "greatest of the great Greek geniuses", and his long-term goal is to take over the world. He makes robots that resemble invertebrates, with his most notable one being his mechanical beetle Scooter. He also dislikes when things are messy.

=== Mirage ===
Mirage (voiced by Bebe Neuwirth) is a cat-like enchantress with power over illusions, dreams and shadows and the ruler of the realm of Morbia, where her home, a sphinx-styled temple, is located. Because she is "Evil Incarnate" as well as powerful and dangerous, she is purely motivated by cruelty and malice and is therefore against any form of good, which she underestimates and attempts to destroy. At some point, Mirage formed the El Khatib, a legion of monsters who can teleport through shadows and are created from children with true seeds of evil. Every seven years, during the three nights of the full moon, she sends out the El Khatib to find potential recruits, enticing them with the promise of power and immortality.

It is implied that Mirage and Fasir were romantically involved, but that he left her due to her evil ways. Despite this, Fasir never gave up hope that they can become lovers again.

=== Mozenrath ===
Mozenrath (voiced by Jonathan Brandis, understudied by Jeff Bennett) is a sorcerer and necromancer and the ruler of the Land of the Black Sand, who took control of the realm from its former ruler, the sorcerer Destane, who was a father figure to him until he stole his power and throne and transformed him into an undead Mamluk.

Sarcastic, psychotic, power-hungry, and extremely greedy and cruel, Mozenrath's main goal is to conquer all of the Seven Deserts and he will step over anyone to achieve it. Although calm and calculating, he can easily lose his temper when things don't go his way. He is also not fond of the idea of Aladdin being killed by someone other than him, which shows his selfish and bratty side.

Mozenrath's power is derived from a magic gauntlet that he wears on his right arm. However, its power has made his arm skeletal and it is implied that it will eventually kill him. His greed and ignorance can also lead to his undoing, as shown in "The Secret of Dagger Rock", where he is defeated by Jasmine (whom he has underestimated because of her princess status) and "The Book of Khartoum", in which he gets double-crossed after teaming with sorcerer Khartoum in hopes of great power. Mozenrath is accompanied by his flying eel sidekick Xerxes (voiced by Frank Welker) and an army of Mamluks.

=== Mukhtar ===
The Mukhtar (voiced by John Kassir) is a reptilian humanoid who is seemingly the last surviving member of the race of Mukhtars, who are the sworn enemies of genies. Though Mukhtars hunted genies just for the honor, he acknowledges that times have changed and he now hunts genies for gold. Although initially Genie's enemy, Mukhtar later reforms and the two become allies. He has a monstrous pet ostrich named Saurus (vocal effects provided by Frank Welker).

=== Nefir Hasenuf ===
Nefir Hasenuf (voiced by René Auberjonois) is an imp with the face of a hawk and bat-like wings, who is greedy and willing to betray others to get what he wants.

Throughout the series, he manipulates Samir into wearing magic shoes that force him to dance, poisons Aladdin and manipulates Genie into accessing a worm that spins golden silk and later transforms into the imp-eating Mothias, and secretly starts a war between Agrabah and Odiferous while serving as the Sultan of Agrabah's war advisor, but his plans are foiled.

=== Prince Uncouthma ===
Uncouthma Limzola Stenchworth (voiced by Tino Insana) is the ruler of the barbarian land of Odiferous, whose inhabitants are based on the European Germanic peoples. He first appears as a suitor for Jasmine, but backs down after realizing that she was already betrothed. He goes on to marry Brawnhilda (voiced by Carol Kane) and they have a son, Bud (voiced by E. G. Daily). His military chief is General Gouda (voiced by Ron Perlman).

Uncouthma is shown to be reasonable and understanding, as he does not show disappointment upon learning that Jasmine is in love with Aladdin and decides to give up pursuing her. He is also willing to listen to Aladdin's side of the story when Nefir Hasenuf tricks him and the Odiferans into entering war Agrabah.

Uncouthma, Brawnhilda, and Bud make a cameo appearance in Aladdin and the King of Thieves, where they attend Aladdin and Jasmine's wedding.

=== Sadira ===
Sadira (voiced by Kellie Martin) is a sand witch and a street rat like Aladdin. After he saves her from Razoul, she falls in love with him and attempts to use her magic to win over his heart, all while being envious of Jasmine, whom she wants out of her way. Sadira's biggest character flaw is her inability to face reality and accept things as the way they are, as she goes to great lengths to get Aladdin to fall in love with her and refuses to accept that he and Jasmine are made for each other.

Sadira later reforms and becomes friends with Aladdin and the others. She also makes a brief, non-speaking cameo in Aladdin and the King of Thieves, in which she attends Aladdin and Jasmine's wedding.

=== Other TV series characters ===
The following are minor characters who are listed in order of appearance:

- The Al Muddy (vocal effects provided by Frank Welker) are an earth elemental race of subterranean mud monsters. They are led by an unnamed giant sultan (voiced by Jim Cummings).
- Thundra (voiced by Candi Milo) is a rain bird who oversees the world's weather.
- Fashoom (voiced by Frank Welker) is a giant cyclops and Fasir's younger brother.
- The Tyrannosaurus (vocal effects provided by Frank Welker) is a carnivorous theropod that lived in the Cretaceous period and survived the KT extinction event.
- Sultan Pasta Al Dente (voiced by Stuart Pankin) is the ruler of the land of Getzistan, which is known throughout the Seven Deserts for their casinos.
- Samir the Destroyer (voiced by Michael Gough) is a giant anthropomorphic pink rhinoceros who was once controlled by Nefir to attack Getzistan using magic dancing shoes.
- Merc (voiced by Dorian Harewood) is the captain of a flying ship, who also appears in Aladdin and the King of Thieves, where he attends Aladdin and Jasmine's wedding. The Rat People work for him, and later aid the Shaman (voiced by Malcolm McDowell), who manipulates them into capturing the Genie so he can gain his powers.
- The Beast is a carnivorous shark-like creature that "swims" through the sand dunes of the Seven Deserts and which Merc pursues. Its skin is encrusted with gemstones from its rest during its winter hibernation.
- King Mamood (voiced by Tahj Mowry) is the spoiled child king of Quirkistan. His assistant is Wazeer (voiced by Ron Glass).
- Prince Wazoo (voiced by Jim Cummings) is a snooty and cowardly prince who is a suitor for Jasmine and attempts to marry her, despite Jasmine's engagement to Aladdin.
- Sootinai (voiced by Dorian Harewood) is a smoke spirit who can absorb smoke to empower itself.
- The Sand Monster (voiced by Jim Cummings) is a monster made of sand that Sadira attempts to recruit.
- Machana (voiced by Dan Castellaneta) is a beetle who is the creator and keeper of orbs that can cure genie sicknesses. He controls mechanical creatures that are involved in tests for those who seek the Orb.
- Squirt (vocal effects provided by Frank Welker) is a creature that resembles a koala with monkey-like limbs. It grants wishes to those who scared him.
- Maya the Mystic (voiced by Miriam Margolyes) is an old woman who tends to rip off her customers (mostly Aladdin), charging them high prices while giving them terrible goods. She also gives them faulty information or does not tell them everything they need to hear.
- Malcho (voiced by Héctor Elizondo) is a giant Amphiptere and enemy of Thundra.
- Frajhid (voiced by Dan Castellanetta) is an ice ifrit who freezes Agrabah after Aladdin and his friends invite him to a place where is "no snow".
- Saleen (voiced by Julie Brown) is a snobbish mermaid sorceress who seeks to have Aladdin for herself and make him her merman prince. She is accompanied by the octopus Armand (vocal effects provided by Frank Welker).
- Magma (voiced by Tone Loc) is a fire ifrit with the power to control the earth's temperature. Known as the Lord of Volcanoes, he is summoned by lighting the Candle of Magma.
- Zin and Zang (both voiced by Brian Tochi) are twin brothers from the Chinese city of Pei Ling who can fuse into a Chinese dragon form via physical contact. The dragon's appearance and abilities vary depending on who initiates the transformation, with Zang being red and destructive while Zin is white and possesses healing abilities that enable him to repair the destruction caused by his brother.
- Shadow Aladdin was created by Ayam Aghoul, originally being a henchman of Aghoul's shadow. After Aghoul is killed, Shadow Aladdin leaves in search of a new host body, but Aladdin captures him.
- The Riders of Ramond are brave and fearless warriors.
- Queen Kimbla (voiced by Linda Gary) is an anthropomorphic kangaroo who rules over a valley of anthropomorphic animals. They were initially distrustful of humans until Aladdin falls into their valley while rescuing a koala kid from falling off a cliff. After he prevents a flood caused by Iago taking one of the diamonds from the dam and defeats Brisbane in combat, she learns that not all humans are bad and not all animals are good.
  - Sydney (voiced by John Astin) is a hyena and teacher.
  - Brisbane (voiced by Michael Dorn) is a warthog and Queen Kimbla's enforcer.
- Amuk Moonrah (voiced by Tim Curry) is an evil chimeric demon and the embodiment of evil. Thousands of years prior to the events of the series, he ruled over ancient Agrabah before being sealed away. He is later freed by Iago, who destroys him using a magic amulet.
- Lord Kutato (vocal effects provided by Jim Cummings) is a Yeti who likes Genie's jokes after Aladdin and his friends find his castle while going back from Odiferous.
- Dominus Tusk (voiced by Jim Cummings, vocal effects provided by Frank Welker) is a giant minotaur who is killed offscreen by the Sultan, with his horns mounted as a trophy.
- Queen Hippsodeth (voiced by Kate Mulgrew in her first appearance; Jennifer Darling in her second and final appearance) is the ruler of the Isle of Galifem, home of the Galifem warriors. After being defeated by the Sultan in battle, she falls in love with him. Her right-hand woman is Scara (voiced by Susan Tolsky).
- Caliph Kapok (voiced by Tim Curry) is the disembodied head of a wizard who desires to have control over his body.
- Evil Aladdin and Evil Genie (the same voices of the original characters) are created by Chaos to make them understand their forces.
- Ajed Al Gebraic (voiced by Jonathan Harris) is the Genie's old master, who is greedy. After using up his three wishes, he sold Genie to a sorcerer for eternal life, but did not gain eternal youth.
- Kileem is the Sultan's evil ancestor, who was a feared warrior and possessed his armor after his death. When the Sultan wears his armor to defeat Dominus Tusk, he is possessed by his spirit.
- Amal (voiced by Michael Bell) is Aladdin's childhood friend, who Mirage transformed into an El Khatib. After the El Khatib return to Mirage's realm, Amal stays on Earth due to lacking a true seed of evil, but remains in his transformed state. Amal leaves Agrabah to do good around the world and regain his human form.
- Minos (voiced by Keith David) and Fatima (voiced by Charity James) are con artists who Aziz was once associated with until they were trapped in the Destiny Stone and transformed into a minotaur and harpy. They are later restored to normal by the Destiny Stone.
- Bobolonius (voiced by Jim Cummings) is the grandfather of the Sultan and the great-grandfather of Jasmine, who resides in the Land of the Dead.
- The Ethereal (voiced by Kath Soucie) is a divine spirit who possesses immense magical power, second only to Chaos. She comes to Agrabah to judge if it will be saved or destroyed.
- Zarasto (voiced by William Callaway) is the leader of a gang of desert marauders from an unspecified country in conflict with Agrabah. He makes two appearances, in which he is pitted against the Riders of Ramond.
- Khartoum (voiced by Tony Jay) is an evil wizard who was imprisoned in his book and can only be freed by the Philosopher's Stone, a magical gem containing cosmic power.
- Queen DeLuca (voiced by Tress MacNeille) is the former Queen of Mesmeria, who wielded the Amulet of Khufu. This allowed her to use magic and grant others amulets of Khufu, but was corrupted and became evil, after which she was imprisoned in the Amulet. After Aladdin's group accidentally frees her, she is freed from the Amulet's corruption after Aladdin breaks it.
  - King Zahbar (voiced by Keith David) is the former King of Mesmeria, who DeLuca transformed into a hawk. After Aladdin breaks the Amulet, he is returned to normal and reconciles with her.
  - Queen DeLuca's Brothers (voiced by Jeff Bennett, Jim Cummings, and Frank Welker) are DeLuca's brothers, who wielded Amulets of Khufu and were imprisoned in them until Queen DeLuca freed them. After Aladdin breaks the Amulet of Khufu, they are freed and lose their powers.
  - The Great Rift is a monster generated by the Amulet of Khufu, which feeds on the anger of its wielder.

== Introduced in Aladdin and the King of Thieves ==
=== Cassim ===
Cassim (speaking voice by John Rhys-Davies; singing voice provided by Merwin Foard) is Aladdin's widowed father. Prior to the events of the first film, he left his wife and newborn son in Agrabah to find the legendary Hand of Midas, which could provide a better life for his family. Some time later, he fell in with the Forty Thieves, eventually becoming their leader, the "King of Thieves". In the present, Cassim reunites with Aladdin and gives up the Hand, realizing that it has done more harm then good. Afterward, he is exiled from Agrabah and leaves to travel the world with Iago.

=== Sa'luk ===
Sa'luk (voiced by Jerry Orbach) is the main antagonist of the third film. He is a member of the 40 Thieves and the right-hand man of Cassim. He battles Aladdin before falling into the water, which he survives and kills a shark while making his way ashore. During the climax, Sa'Luk accidentally touches the Hand of Midas, which transforms him into a gold statue. His primary weapon is a knuckleduster with three gold claws attached.

=== Forty Thieves ===
The Forty Thieves are a group of thieves and assassins that are led by Cassim with Sa'luk as his second-in-command. They make their headquarters in Mount Sesame by the sea, which can be accessed by saying "Open Sesame". Cassim has a rule of not harming the innocent, much to the dismay of Sa'luk. Thanks to Sa'luk after surviving his apparent death following his duel with Aladdin, Razoul and the Guards learn how to get into Mount Sesame. 33 of the 40 Thieves were apprehended while 7 avoided capture. Sa'luk lied to the 7 Thieves stating that Cassim had sold them out and persuades them to help him get Cassim back on track in finding the Hand of Midas.

The members of the Forty Thieves are voiced by Jeff Bennett, Corey Burton, Jess Harnell, Clyde Kusatsu, and Rob Paulsen. Their singing voices in "Welcome to the Forty Thieves" are provided by Scott Barnes, Don Bradford, David Friedman, Paul Kandel, Peter Samuel, Gordon Stanley, and Guy Stroman.

=== The Oracle ===
The Oracle (voiced by CCH Pounder) is an omniscient entity bound to a staff, who can answer only one question per person. After being given as a gift at Aladdin and Jasmine's wedding, Cassim seeks to find it to find the Hand of Midas.

=== The Vanishing Isle ===
The Vanishing Isle is a giant sea turtle with a marble fortress on its back where the Hand of Midas is hidden. It periodically rises to the surface before diving back underwater.

After the Oracle guides a captured Cassim, Sa'luk, and the remaining seven of the Forty Thieves to where it will emerge, the turtle surfaces from underneath them and they search for the Hand, but are ambushed by Aladdin and his friends. As they locate the Hand, the turtle prepares to dive and they flee to where the Hand is. Following a confrontation with Sa'luk, they escape the island with their friends as it disappears.

== Introduced in Disney's Aladdin in Nasira's Revenge ==
=== Nasira ===
Nasira (voiced by Jodi Benson) is Jafar's fraternal twin sister and the main antagonist of the game, who seeks to resurrect him using the Serpent Idols.

=== The Arachnid ===
The Arachnid, also known as the Spider, is a giant arachnid with a monstrous appetite who is a boss in the game.

=== Anubis ===
Anubis is a villain whose sorcery is the source of the Serpent Idols' restorative magic.

=== Evil Sultan ===
The Evil Sultan is an evil monarch who seeks to become the new ruler of Agrabah.

== Introduced in Disney Princess Enchanted Tales: Follow Your Dreams ==
=== Sahara ===
Sahara is the horse of Jasmine's late mother, who was the only one who could ride her. When Sahara went missing, Jasmine searches for him and returns him to Agrabah before her father notices his disappearance.

=== Hakeem ===
Hakeem (voiced by Zack Shada) is a servant boy in the palace stables. Jasmine helps retrieve Sahara so he does not lose his job.

=== Aneesa ===
Aneesa (voiced by Flo Di Re) is Jasmine's loyal servant, who works in the palace. She first convinces a discouraged Jasmine never to give up and tries her best and later distracts the Sultan from going to the royal stables while Jasmine searches for Sahara.

=== Sharma ===
Sharma (voiced by Tara Strong) is Jasmine's cousin and a teacher at the Royal Academy.

== Introduced in Aladdin (2019 film) ==
=== Dalia ===
Dalia (portrayed by Nasim Pedrad) is Jasmine's handmaiden and the only real friend she had in the palace. Dalia later becomes Genie's love interest and, after Genie is freed from the lamp and becomes a human, Dalia leaves Agrabah with Jasmine's approval to be with him, later marrying him and having two children.

=== Omar and Lian ===
Omar (portrayed by Jordan A. Nash) and Lian (portrayed by Taliyah Blair) are Genie and Dalia's children, to whom the Genie tells the story of Aladdin.

=== Zulla ===
Zulla (portrayed by Nina Wadia) is a market trader. Wadia describes her appearance as "more of a cameo", as extra footage was needed after filming had wrapped.
