= Aladdin Jr. =

2005 musical

- Music: Alan Menken
- Lyrics: Howard Ashman; Tim Rice; Chad Beguelin
- Book: Chad Beguelin
- Basis: Disney film Aladdin

Aladdin Jr. is a 60-minute musical adapted from the 1992 Walt Disney Animation Studios film Aladdin for licensing company Music Theatre International's Broadway Junior collection, a series of abridged musicals and original adaptations developed for younger performers. A 30-minute adaptation for elementary-school-aged performers, Disney's Aladdin KIDS, is also available.

Following the success of the film's musical adaptation, the original Aladdin JR. script was replaced with an adaptation of the Broadway version.

== Synopsis ==
Source: MTI Shows

Genie and the Agrabahns welcome us to Agrabah, introducing Aladdin and his penniless pals, Babkak, Omar, and Kassim; Princess Jasmine and her doting father, the Sultan; and the evil Jafar and Iago ("Overture/ Arabian Nights). Inside the marketplace, a Shop Owner berates the hungry Aladdin for stealing a loaf of bread, causing Razoul and his Guards to chase after him and his pals ("One Jump Ahead") until they escape. Afterward, when an Apple Vendor reviles two Beggars, Aladdin offers them his bread and defends them when Prince Abdullah and his attendants shove them out of his way ("One Jump Ahead - Reprise / Proud of Your Boy").

In the palace, Jafar plots with Iago to become Sultan as Jasmine rejects Prince Abdullah and the Sultan declares that she must marry by the next moon. Frustrated, Jasmine confides in her attendants - Isir, Manal, and Rajah - who encourage her to open up to experiences beyond the palace ("These Palace Walls"). As Jasmine disguises herself and takes off to heed their advice, Jafar and Iago invoke an incantation, and a Spooky Voice reveals that Aladdin is the key to finding a magic lamp that will grant Jafar the power to become Sultan.

In the marketplace, Aladdin and his friends put on a show in the hope of earning some money ("Babkak, Omar, Aladdin, Kassim"). When Aladdin notices the seemingly out-of-place Jasmine and offers to show her around the marketplace, Jasmine unthinkingly takes an apple from a vendor, catching the attention of the guards. The two escape together and share their mutual experience of feeling "trapped." When the guards discover and detain them, Jasmine reveals herself to be the Princess and is escorted back to the palace, vowing to get Aladdin released. In disguise, Jafar and Iago pay off the guards and lead Aladdin to the Cave of Wonders, where he is instructed to fetch only the lamp. Distracted by the treasures, Aladdin becomes trapped within the cave until he rubs the lamp and releases the all-powerful Genie ("Friend Like Me"), who helps him escape. Granting the first of Aladdin's three wishes, Genie transforms him into Prince Ali Ababwa, which Aladdin hopes will help him to woo Jasmine.

Back at the palace, Jafar, thinking that Aladdin is still trapped in the cave, informs a despondent Jasmine that the boy's sentence has already been carried out. Just then, Aladdin and his friends make a grand entrance as Prince Ali with his Entourage ("Prince Ali"), but his demeanor offends Jasmine, who storms off. Frustrated, Aladdin lashes out at his friends, who in turn abandon him and leave the palace.

Later, on the Princess's balcony, Prince Ali gains Jasmine's trust and invites her on a magic carpet ride ("A Whole New World"). After bidding her farewell, Aladdin is arrested by Jafar for trespassing in the Princess's private chambers.

Omar, returning to help Aladdin, witnesses his arrest and runs to tell his pals, who pledge to help him ("High Adventure"), but they too are detained as they storm the palace. Aladdin uses his second wish, and Genie frees them all.

Aladdin vows to tell Jasmine the truth, but changes his mind when she tells him he is to become Sultan after they wed. Unsure of his own moral character and ability, Aladdin fears he may need his third wish to succeed as a ruler. After a disappointed Genie turns his back on Aladdin and retreats into the lamp, Aladdin weighs his options and ultimately runs off to tell Jasmine the truth. He leaves behind the lamp, which Jafar and Iago gleefully take.

At the wedding, Jafar reveals Prince Ali's real identity ("Prince Ali - Reprise") and demands that Genie make him Sultan. Aladdin then tricks him into wishing to become the most powerful genie of all time - forever trapping him inside his own lamp. Using his last wish, Aladdin frees Genie; and the Sultan, moved by Aladdin's courage and Jasmine's wisdom, alters the law so that the Princess can rule Agrabah and marry whomever she chooses. Picking Aladdin, Jasmine and all of Agrabah live happily, and freely, ever after ("Finale").

== Characters ==
- Aladdin
- Babkak
- Omar
- Kassim
- Genie
- Iago
- Isir, Manal, and Rajah
- Jafar
- Jasmine
- Sultan
- Razoul
- Royal Guards
- Agrabahns
- Prince Abdullah
- Attendants
- Spooky Voice
- Cave of Wonders
- Ensemble
- Entourage

== Dual language edition ==
A dual language edition of the script was also produced, featuring a book by Jim Luigs and José Cruz González. This version of Aladdin JR. presents the story in both English and Spanish.
