= Rasoul Azadani =

Iranian layout artist

- Born: 1955 (age 70–71); Isfahan, Iran
- Education: California Institute of the Arts
- Occupation: Animator
- Years active: 1985–present
- Employer: Walt Disney Animation Studios

Rasoul Azadani (Persian: رسول آزادانی, pronounced [ɾæsuːl-e ɒːzɒːdɒːniː]; born 1965) is an Iranian animator, lighting designer and layout artist. He is best known for his work at Walt Disney Animation Studios. In 1995, he was nominated for an Annie Award in the category "Best Individual Achievement for Production Design in the Field of Animation" for his work on Pocahontas.

== Life and career ==
[Rasoul Azadani] has got a strong eye in terms of composition, filmmaking, cutting, staging and contrast ... He's empowered.

— Tony Bancroft

Azadani was born in 1965 in the city of Isfahan. He entered Institute for the Intellectual Development of Children and Young Adults to study animation, after receiving his High school diploma. Azadani later worked for the Institution as an Animation Instructor, before emigrating to United States and studying at the California Institute of the Arts. Azadani joined Walt Disney Animation Studios to work as a layout assistant in 1985.

The character Razoul from the Disney animated film Aladdin is named after Azadani. In the movie, Jafar originally used the phrase "Rasoul Azadani" to open the Cave of Wonders, but it was later cut.

== Filmography ==
Year	Film	Assistant layout artist	Layout artist	Layout supervisor	Animatic supervisor	Lighting designer	Notes
1986	The Great Mouse Detective	Yes					
1987	The Chipmunk Adventure		Yes				
1988	Garfield and Friends		Yes				2 episodes
1988	Oliver & Company		Yes				
1989	The Little Mermaid		Yes				
1990	The Rescuers Down Under		Yes				
1991	Beauty and the Beast		Yes				
1992	Aladdin			Yes			
1994	The Lion King		Yes				
1995	Pocahontas			Yes			
1997	Hercules		Yes				
1999	Fantasia 2000			Yes			Segment "Rhapsody in Blue"
2000	Rhapsody in Blue		Yes				
2000	The Emperor's New Groove			Yes			
2002	Treasure Planet			Yes			
2007	The Simpsons Movie			Yes			
2009	The Princess and the Frog			Yes	Yes	Yes	
2009	Pups of Liberty						Visual development artist
2011	Winnie the Pooh			Yes			
2012	The Longest Daycare			Yes			
2012	Paperman		Yes				
2016	Moana		Yes				
2019	Abominable (a.k.a. Everest)						Additional Visual Development Artist
TBA	Untitled Musical Film By Byron P. Howard and Jason Groh and Sean V. Jeffrey and Dan Fogelman and Lin-Manuel Miranda						Additional Visual Development Artist

== Awards ==
Year	Award	Work	Category	Result
1995	Annie Awards	Pocahontas	Best Individual Achievement for Production Design in the Field of Animation	Nominated
