= Disney's Aladdin (SNES video game) =

1993 video game

Aladdin
- North American SNES box art
- Developer: Capcom
- Publisher: Capcom
- Producers: Tatsuya Minami; Hironobu Takeshita
- Designer: Shinji Mikami
- Composers: Yuki Iwai; Yuko Takehara; Setsuo Yamamoto
- Series: Aladdin
- Platforms: Super NES, Game Boy Advance
- Release: Super NES: NA: November 15, 1993; JP: November 26, 1993; BR: December 1993; UK: December 1, 1993; EU: January 27, 1994; Game Boy Advance: JP: August 1, 2003; EU: March 19, 2004; NA: September 28, 2004
- Genre: Platform
- Mode: Single-player

Aladdin (Note: Arajin (アラジン)) is a 1993 platform game developed and published by Capcom for the Super Nintendo Entertainment System, based on the 1992 animated Disney film of the same name. Disney's Aladdin is a 2D side-scrolling video game in which the player controls Aladdin and his monkey Abu. It was designed by Shinji Mikami.

The game was released in November 1993, the same month that another game with the same title was released by Virgin Games for the Sega Genesis. The two games vary in some respects; in the Genesis game, Aladdin wields a scimitar, which is not the case in the Capcom game. The Capcom game was ported to the Game Boy Advance (GBA) in Japan on August 1, 2003, in Europe on March 19, 2004, and in North America on September 28, 2004.

== Gameplay ==
One of the SNES version's stages

Disney's Aladdin is a side-scrolling platform game in which the player controls the eponymous main character through several stages taking place throughout the city of Agrabah. Within each stage, Aladdin defeats foes by jumping on them or disorienting them by throwing apples while avoiding dangerous obstacles. Gems can be collected to gain extra lives and points, and ten red gems located within each stage will substantially increase the player's score. Most stages contain a treasure chest holding a scarab that flies about for a few seconds. If the player collects it before it disappears they will access a bonus stage in which they spin a wheel that allows Genie to grant them extra lives and other special bonuses. Aladdin has a health meter of hearts, starting with 3, which will deplete each time he is hit. These can be increased through pickups or through the bonus stages as well. As with the Genesis title, Aladdin starts with a number of extra lives, which are lost when his health is depleted or he falls off the bottom of the screen. The game ends when the player runs out of lives, although the player can continue playing from the current level as long as they have continues remaining.

The escape from the Cave of Wonders and the carpet ride with Princess Jasmine are both stages in which the player rides the Magic Carpet through self-scrolling stages. While in the Cave of Wonders the player must traverse up and down to avoid dangerous obstacles while outrunning waves of lava, the ride with Jasmine is a free-flying bonus stage (between stages 5 and 6) in which the player can collect gems; the bonus stage ends when the melody to "A Whole New World" ends. Stages 1, 6 and 7 have a boss to defeat, stage 7 being the final stage; stages 2, 3, 4 and 5 require reaching the end to complete.

== Reception ==
Reception

Aggregate scores
Aggregator	Score
GameRankings	SNES: 78% GBA: 65%
Metacritic	GBA: 59/100

Review scores
Publication	Score
AllGame	4/5
Electronic Gaming Monthly	8/10, 8/10, 9/10, 8/10
Famitsu	8/10, 6/10, 9/10, 8/10
GameFan	356/400
GamePro	4.5/5
GamesMaster	78%
Hyper	90%
Datormagazin	5/5
SEGA Magazin	85%

In the United Kingdom, Aladdin was the top-selling SNES game of December 1993.

Electronic Gaming Monthly's four reviewers commented that the graphics, animation, music and gameplay are all outstanding. GameFan's four reviewers scored it 90%, 89%, 87% and 90%. Nintendo Power's reviewers scored the game 4.2, 4.2, 3.9 and 3.9, praising the game for "Beautiful graphics, excellent animation and superior play control" while noting the game was "not as challenging as you would expect from Capcom". A ScrewAttack reviewer also gave the game a positive review, saying that it was one of the best SNES games. Aladdin proved to be a commercial success, selling approximately 1.75 million copies worldwide, becoming Capcom's highest-selling game for the Super Nintendo Entertainment System after Street Fighter II and its various versions and became one of the best-sellers of the SNES, as well as the best-selling licensed game of the system overall.

Shinji Mikami, the game's designer, said that if he had not made the SNES game, he "would probably buy" the Genesis game because it has a sword and better animation.

The GBA port received mixed reviews. Avi Fryman of GameSpy called the port of Disney's Aladdin "the most monumentally disappointing" of all the ports from SNES to GBA.

=== Accolades ===
IGN placed the SNES version 60th on their list of the "Top 100 SNES Games of All Time", commenting that the game "faithfully [translates] the film's over-the-top magic into magical 16-bit form". In 2018, Complex rated the game 42nd in its list of "The Best Super Nintendo Games of All Time". In 1995, Total! ranked Aladdin 47th on its list of the "Top 100 SNES Games", praising its animation and gameplay.

== Re-release ==
The SNES version of the game was included alongside The Jungle Book, The Lion King and the Genesis version of Aladdin as part of Disney Classic Games Collection: Aladdin, The Lion King, and The Jungle Book, an updated release of Disney Classic Games: Aladdin and The Lion King, which was set for release for the Nintendo Switch, PlayStation 4, Windows and Xbox One on November 9, 2021, before being delayed until November 23. Those who purchased the original Disney Classic Games release are also able to purchase the game and The Jungle Book as downloadable content.
