= 7iber =

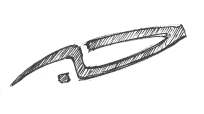
- Categories: multimedia web publication
- Founder: Ramsey George, Lina Ejeilat, Naseem Tarawnah
- Founded: May 25, 2007
- Country: Jordan
- Based in: Amman
- Language: Arabic
- Website: www.7iber.com

7iber (Arabic: حبر) is an Amman-based online citizen media and multimedia journalism organization founded in 2007 and registered as an LLC in 2009. It is pronounced "Hiber" with the 7 standing in for the "haa" sound in Arabic, and means "ink."

== Mission ==
7iber is a bootstrapped multimedia content producer which conducts original research of Internet governance and digital rights and operates a co-working office, and an events space, including a cafe. 7iber also conducts training on topics related to digital media.

== Press and publication in Jordan ==
On July 1, 2013, 7iber.com was blocked by the Jordanian government during a crackdown on online media. The block came after a public debate over the Press and Publication Law where Fayez Shawabkeh, the director of the government's Press and Publication Department, was asked why the website was not blocked previously. Shawabkeh said, "If I find it's a news website, I will block it," and later added, "if it's a blog, the law does not apply to it." The Jordanian government determined that 7iber is a news website rather than a blog, and blocked access to the site until 7iber registers as a news agency.

7iber's administration says they were informed of the ban only through a memo sent by the Press and Publication Department to the Telecom Regulatory Commission. "If the Press and Publication Department decided that 7iber.com needs a license, which is against all their public statements about blogs, they are supposed to officially inform us of this decision and give us 90 days before blocking the website," 7iber added in an official statement. They also said that the law in question is a tool used to arbitrarily stifle freedom of expression.

In order to register as a news agency, 7iber would have to have an editor in chief that has been a member of the Jordan Press Association (JPA) for at least 4 years, but membership in the JPA is not given to journalists who work in online media. 7iber was blocked again in August 2014.
