= Arabian Coast (Tokyo DisneySea) =

Themed area in Tokyo DisneySea

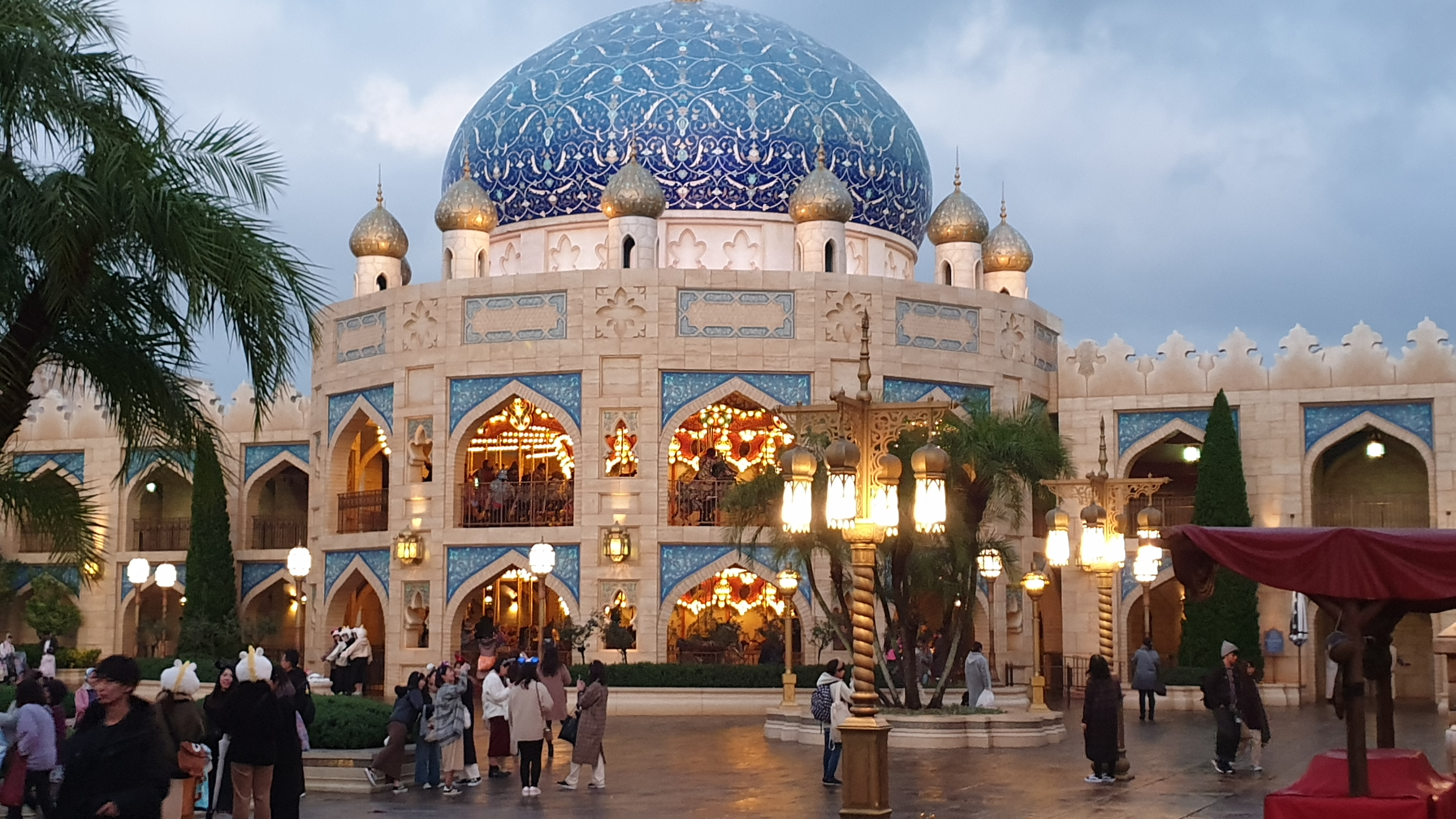
- The Dome of the Caravan Carousel
- Interactive map of Arabian Coast
- Theme: Aladdin, and the Arabian Nights

Attractions
- Total: 4
- Other rides: 4

Tokyo DisneySea
- Coordinates: 35°37′42.15″N 139°52′56.76″E
- Status: Operating
- Opened: September 4, 2001

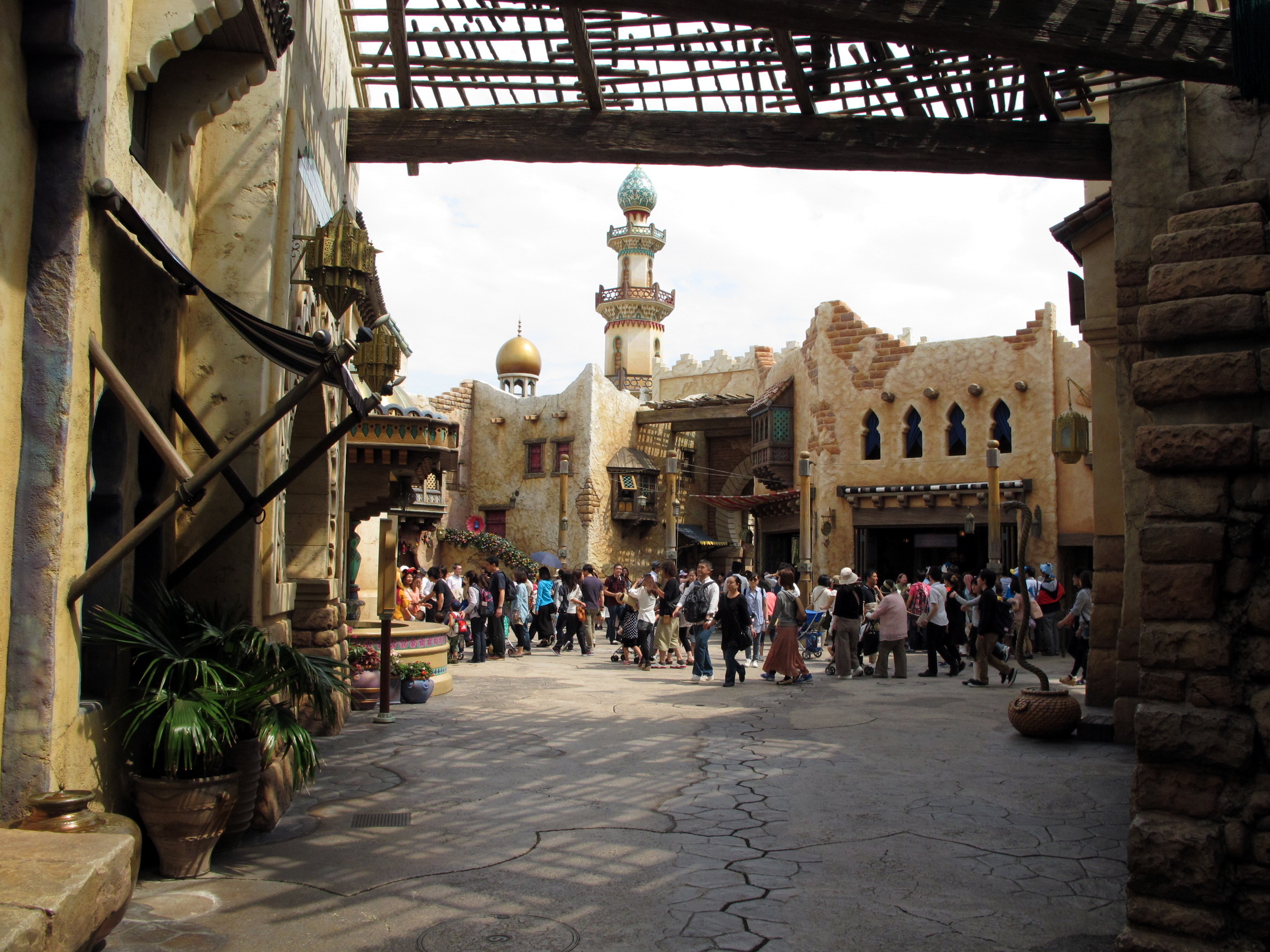
The area contains Middle-Eastern inspired architecture.

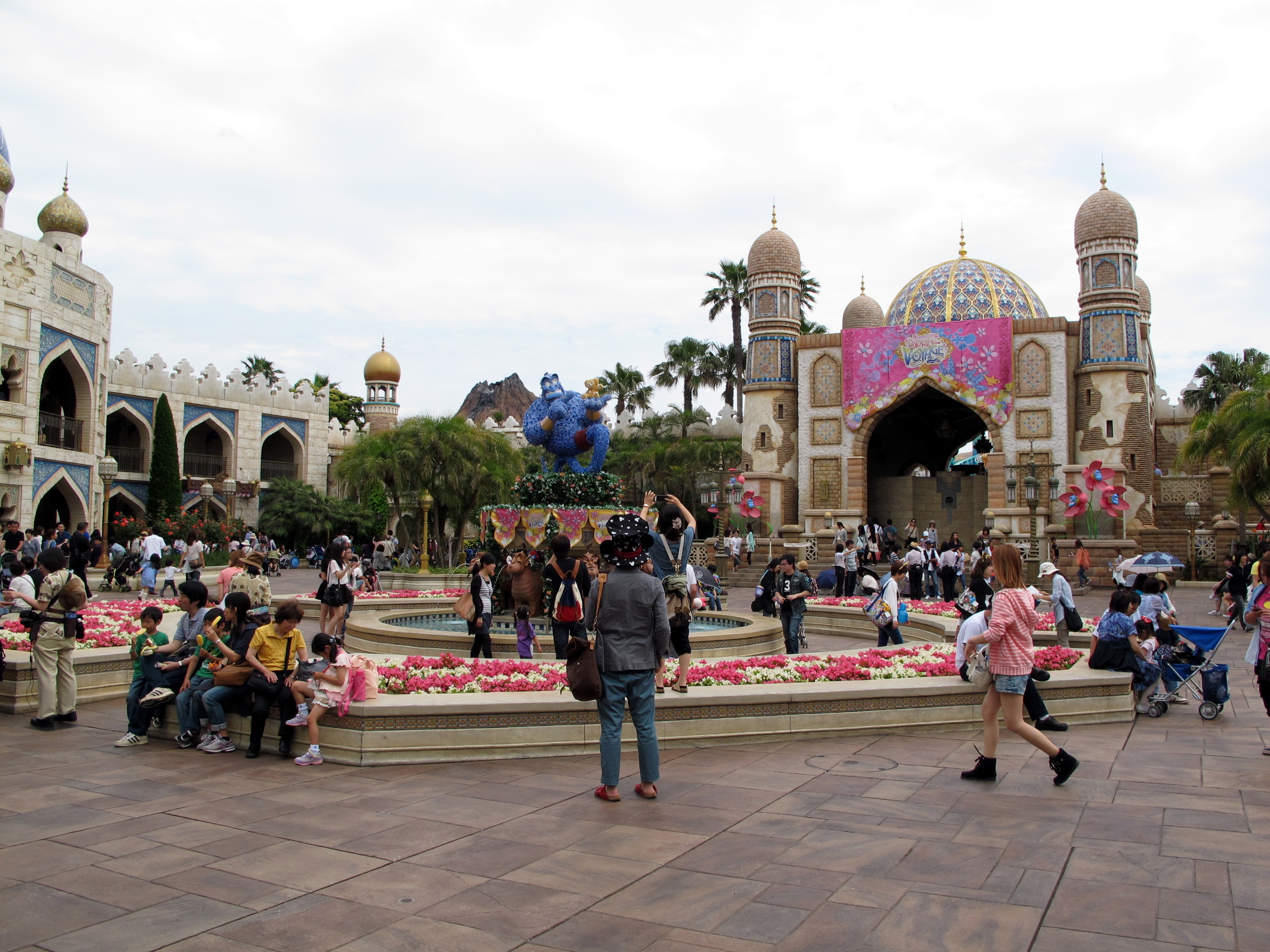
Arabian Coast

Arabian Coast (Japanese: アラビアンコースト) is a "port-of-call" (themed land) at Tokyo DisneySea in the Tokyo Disney Resort.

== Theming ==
The themed area recreates an Arabian harbor, combining the universe of the Disney movie Aladdin with the world from the 1001 Arabian Nights. As such, the architecture and atmosphere are inspired by many Middle-Eastern and Indian influences.

== Attractions and entertainment ==
- Jasmine's Flying Carpets
- The Magic Lamp Theater
- Caravan Carousel
- Sindbad's Storybook Voyage

=== Former ===
- Sindbad's Seven Voyages

== Restaurants and refreshments ==
=== Current ===
- Casbah Food Court
  - Flying Carpet Curry
  - Royal Tandor
  - Noodle Charmer
- Sultan's Oasis
- Open Sesame

=== Former ===
- Alibaba

== Shopping ==
- Agrabah Marketplace
- Abu's Bazaar
