= Aladdin (Disney character) =

Disney character

- Aladdin character
- Aladdin as depicted in the 1992 animated film
- First appearance: Aladdin (1992)
- Created by: Ron Clements; John Musker
- Based on: Aladdin
- Voiced by: Scott Weinger (speaking); Brad Kane (singing); Rick Logan (Mickey's Magical Christmas: Snowed in at the House of Mouse)
- Portrayed by: Adam Jacobs (2011 musical); Mena Massoud (2019 film)

In-universe information
- Alias: Prince Ali Ababwa (alter ego)
- Nicknames: Al (by Genie); Street Rat (by Jafar, among other enemies)
- Occupation: Thief (formerly); Prince and heir to the throne of Agrabah
- Alignment: Good
- Family: Cassim (father)
- Spouse: Jasmine
- Relatives: The Sultan (father-in-law)
- Nationality: Agrabah

Aladdin is a fictional character in Disney's animated film Aladdin based on "Aladdin", a folk tale of Middle Eastern origin. He is voiced by Scott Weinger, while his singing voice is provided by Brad Kane. He also stars in the two direct-to-video sequels The Return of Jafar (1994) and Aladdin and the King of Thieves (1996), as well as the animated television series based on the film. Mena Massoud played a live-action version of the character in a live action adaptation of the 1992 film.

Aladdin is introduced as a young thief living in the fictional city of Agrabah. When Aladdin was only an infant, his father, Cassim, left him and his mother to find a better life for his family. Aladdin discovers a lamp containing Genie, a djinn capable of granting wishes.

== Development ==
One of the first issues that the animators faced during the production of Aladdin was the depiction of Aladdin himself. Director and producer John Musker explains: "In early screenings, we played with him being a little bit younger, and he had a mother in the story. [...] In design, he became more athletic-looking, more filled out, more of a young leading man, more of a teen-hunk version than before." He was initially going to be as young as 13, but that eventually changed to 17 to 18.

Supervising animator Glen Keane was inspired by various teen idols and movie actors in designing Aladdin's physique. The main inspiration for his appearance was originally Michael J. Fox in Back to the Future, but later changed to Tom Cruise. Keane based the movement of Aladdin's loose pants on rapper MC Hammer. Some have said this conception of the character makes him too contemporary, given the film's setting.

== Characteristics ==
Aladdin was drawn with large eyes, like those of other Disney heroes, to indicate innocence. The lineaments of his body are more free-flowing and more rounded than is usual for Disney heroes. He looks like a modern 17 to 18-year-old, except for his wardrobe. In the film, they often describe him as a street rat. Later in the film, he wields a scimitar sword.

Aladdin is portrayed as quick-witted, and ultimately a caring person. Like most Disney male protagonists, he is a heroic young man who seeks to win the affection of many other characters, which demonstrates his insecurity. He is not above lying and stealing, though never with malicious intentions, but to survive. The biggest difference from the norm is that, unlike most youthful Disney heroes, he is a doer rather than a passive character.

As a street urchin, he wears a red fez hat, a purple vest, a baggy cream dhoti (with a patch covering a hole) and goes barefoot; he retains this appearance even in the animated series after his engagement to Jasmine.

His "Prince Ali" outfit is a white and gold ensemble with a flowing cape, and a large headpiece topped with a feather and a jewel.

== Appearances ==
=== Aladdin ===
In the first film, street rat Aladdin meets a girl in the marketplace. He falls deeply in love with her at first sight, but he gets into trouble when their meeting is interrupted by guards who arrest him. She reveals that she is actually Princess Jasmine. Despite Jasmine's efforts to demand the guards to release Aladdin immediately, they tell her that she must first deal with Jafar in order to free him.

In prison, Aladdin meets an old man (who is Jafar in disguise) who mentions a cave filled with treasure and that he needs Aladdin to enter it. The old man reveals a secret exit, and Aladdin escapes with him and follows him into the desert. He enters the Cave of Wonders, where he meets a sentient magic carpet and is commanded to only get a magic lamp. He gets it, But when his pet Abu picks up a giant gem, the cave begins to collapse. Aladdin, Abu, and the carpet are left in the cave. Abu delivers the lamp to Aladdin, and when he rubs it, a giant blue Genie appears, telling Aladdin he will fulfill three wishes. After leaving the collapsed cave with the Genie's help, he decides to become a prince in order to win Jasmine's heart.

=== The Return of Jafar ===
In the first direct-to-video sequel, The Return of Jafar (1994), Jasmine begins to question her love for Aladdin, wondering if he is a duplicitous liar after he saves Iago, Jafar's former pet parrot who had tortured her father. Meanwhile, Jafar is freed from his lamp by a bumbling bandit named Abis Mal, and immediately plots his retribution against Aladdin.

=== Aladdin (TV series) ===
An animated series was created for The Disney Afternoon and CBS and aired from 1994 to 1995, based on the original 1992 feature. The series picked up where The Return of Jafar left off, with Aladdin being engaged to Jasmine while still living on the streets of Agrabah, and having many adventures with his friends both in and outside of Agrabah.

In the Aladdin television episode "The Lost Ones", it is shown that he had a childhood friend named Amal. The two-part episode "Seems Like Old Crimes" shows that when Aladdin was sixteen, he fell in with a group of circus performers where he met his pet monkey Abu.

=== Aladdin and the King of Thieves ===
In the film, Aladdin discovers that his long-lost father, Cassim, is still alive, and sets out to find him. Cassim had left the family shortly after his son's birth. Aladdin's mother died when he was just a child. At the climax of the film, Jasmine and Aladdin are finally wed, and Aladdin reconciles with his father.

=== Aladdin (2019 film) ===
In the live-action movie adaptation of the first Aladdin movie of the same name, Aladdin is portrayed by Mena Massoud. The plot follows the story of human form Genie, as he tells a story to his two children about a street urchin named Aladdin, who falls in love with Princess Jasmine, befriends a wish-granting Genie, and battles the conspiring Jafar.

=== Video games ===
Aladdin appears in various video games, including the game versions of the film.

Aladdin has also appeared in the Kingdom Hearts series of games as a supporting character. He wields a scimitar as his primary weapon and can utilize Abu to solve puzzles when he is an active party member. In the first game, Princess Jasmine is kidnapped by Jafar and Maleficent. Aladdin teams up with Sora to save her. In Kingdom Hearts II, Aladdin is found experiencing deep depression due to his loneliness after Genie went to see the other worlds. When Genie comes back all is well again.

Aladdin appears in the Nintendo 3DS game Disney Magical World. Agrabah is one of the four movie worlds accessible to the player, and several characters from the movie appear in the game. The player may also collect a number of Aladdin-themed items and clothing pieces.

Aladdin is a playable character in Disney Infinity 2.0, Disney Magic Kingdoms, Disney Mirrorverse, Disney Speedstorm, and appears as a villager in Disney Dreamlight Valley.

=== In other media ===
Aladdin was formerly a member of the Disney Adventurers franchise targeted at young boys sold by the Disney Store from 1999–2004, which sold various merchandise.

He appears in Hercules and the Arabian Night, set after the end of King of Thieves as Jasmine refers to herself as married. He is featured as a guest in the series House of Mouse, and its films Mickey's Magical Christmas: Snowed in at the House of Mouse and Mickey's House of Villains.

Aladdin also appears at the Walt Disney Parks and Resorts as a meetable character. He is a frequently-seen character, and often accompanied by Jasmine, and occasionally Genie. Though he goes barefoot in the film, he wears moccasins in his street rat clothes. Aladdin and his fellow characters are mostly found in Adventureland. Aladdin, Jasmine, Carpet, Abu and Genie make cameo appearances in the Hong Kong Disneyland version of It's a Small World.

In the Broadway musical adaptation, Aladdin is played by actor Adam Jacobs.

Aladdin has a cameo appearance in the short film Once Upon a Studio, where after Maui warns about the meeting of characters from Walt Disney Animation Studios, upon hearing him he goes down the railing of the stairs together with Abu, and when trying to land he ends up slipping on the trolls in the form of rocks. Later, he appears along with the rest of the characters in the group photo.

Aladdin is featured in A Whole New World, the first book in the "A Twisted Tale" series by Liz Braswell. These books feature darker, alternate storylines of classic Disney films, with the first book asking "What if Aladdin had never found the lamp?"
