= Aladdin (disambiguation) =

Aladdin is a folk tale of Middle Eastern origin.

Aladdin, Aladin, and variants such as Aladdin and His Magic Lamp, may also refer to:

== Arts and entertainment ==
=== Disney franchise ===
- Aladdin (franchise)
  - Aladdin (Disney character), protagonist of Disney's Aladdin franchise
  - Aladdin (1992 Disney film), an animated film
    - Aladdin (1992 soundtrack)
  - Aladdin (2011 musical), based on the film
  - Aladdin (animated TV series), 1994–1995
  - Disney's Aladdin: A Musical Spectacular, a Broadway-style show, 2003–2016
  - Disney's Aladdin (SNES video game), 1993
  - Disney's Aladdin (Genesis video game), 1993
  - Disney's Aladdin (1994 video game), for Sega's 8-bit consoles
  - Aladdin (2019 film), a live action adaptation of the 1992 film
    - Aladdin (2019 soundtrack)

=== Films ===
- Aladdin and the Wonderful Lamp (1917 film), a silent film
- Aladdin's Lamp, a 1931 animated short film produced by Terrytoons
- Aladdin and the Wonderful Lamp (1934 film), an animated short film directed by Ub Iwerks
- Aladdin and His Wonderful Lamp, a 1939 animated short film with Popeye as Aladdin
- Aladdin's Lamp, a 1943 animated short film with Gandy Goose
- Aladdin's Lamp, a 1947 animated short film with Mighty Mouse
- Aladdin and His Lamp, 1952, by Lew Landers
- Aladdin Aur Jadui Chirag, a 1952 Indian film
- Alladin and the Wonderful Lamp (1957 film), an Indian film
- Aladdin (1958 film), a television musical by Cole Porter
- The Wonders of Aladdin, a 1961 Italian film
- Aladdin and His Magic Lamp, a 1966 British television film starring Arthur Askey
- Aladdin and His Magic Lamp (1967 film), a Soviet film
- Aladdin and His Magic Lamp (1970 film), a French animated film
- Adventures of Aladdin, a 1978 Indian film
- Allauddinum Albhutha Vilakkum, or Aladdin and the Magic Lamp, a 1979 Malayalam film
- Aladdin and the Wonderful Lamp (1982 film), a Japanese anime film
- Aladdin (1986 film), or Superfantagenio, a 1986 Italian film
- Aladdin, a 1990 American musical television film starring Barry Bostwick
- Aladdin (1992 Golden Films film), a Japanese and American animated film
- Aladdin and the Adventure of All Time, a 2000 American and Filipino animated film directed by Cirio H. Santiago
- Aladin (film), a 2009 Indian Hindi-language fantasy action film
- Aladdin 3477 (2025 film trilogy), a live action adaptation which takes place in the future

=== Music ===
- Aladdin (Nielsen), a 1919 score by Carl Nielsen to accompany a new production of the play
- Aladdin and His Wonderful Lamp (Cliff Richard and the Shadows album), 1964
- "Aladdin", song by Not3s

=== Musicals, operas and plays ===
- Aladdin (play), by Adam Oehlenschläger, 1805
- Aladdin (Atterberg opera), by Kurt Atterberg, 1941
- Aladdin (Horneman opera), by Christian Frederik Emil Horneman, 1888
- Aladdin and the Magic Lamp opera by Nino Rota
- Aladdin and the Wondrous Lamp opera by Henry Rowley Bishop
- Aladdin (1979 musical), by Sandy Wilson

=== Television ===
- Aladdin – Naam Toh Suna Hoga, an Indian TV series 2018–2021
- "Aladdin and His Wonderful Lamp", a 1986 episode of Faerie Tale Theatre
- "Aladdin", a 2009 episode of Super Why!

== Businesses and brands ==
- Aladdin (BlackRock) An all-encompassing data collection and evaluation management system for risk assessments of investments (Asset, Liability, and Debt and Derivative Investment Network)
- Aladdin (containers)
  - Aladdin Industries, makers of vacuum flasks and lunchboxes
- The Aladdin Company, a company that sold mail-order houses
- Aladdin Knowledge Systems, a software company
- Aladdin Paperbacks, a division of Simon & Schuster, USA
- Aladdin Records, a record label
- Aladdin Systems, later Allume Systems, a software company
- Aladin Foods, a Bulgarian fast food chain

== People ==
- Aladdin (name), a male given name

== Places ==
=== Places of entertainment ===
- Aladdin (hotel and casino), in Las Vegas, U.S., 1962–1997
  - Planet Hollywood Las Vegas, on the same site, known as The Aladdin 2000–2007
- Aladdin Theater, a historic theater in Cocoa, Florida, U.S.
- Aladdin Theater (Portland, Oregon), U.S.
- Aladdin Theatre for the Performing Arts, now Zappos Theatre, Los Angeles, U.S.
- Aladin Music Hall, a nightclub in Bremen, Germany
- Hotel Aladdin, in Caracas, Venezuela

=== Settlements ===
- Aladin, Azerbaijan
- Aladin, Iran
- Aladdin, Wyoming, U.S.
- Aladdin City, Florida, U.S.
- Aladdin (crater), on Saturn's moon Enceladus

== Science and technology ==
- Aladdin Deck Enhancer, a games console adapter
- ALADDiN, a line of chipsets by ALi Corporation
- Aladin Sky Atlas, interactive software
- EMT Aladin, a German miniature unmanned aerial vehicle
- Aladin (protein), also known as adracalin, is a nuclear envelope protein

== Other uses ==
- Aladdin's Other Lamp, a 1927 American fantasy-comedy silent film
- Aladdin's Lantern, a 1938 Our Gang comedy short film
- Aladdin's Dragons, a 2000 bidding-based board game by Richard Breese
- Aladdin's Eatery, an American chain of Lebanese restaurants
- Aladdinn (1975–2010), a leading sire of Arabian horses
- Project Aladdin, a UNESCO intercultural project to counter Holocaust denial

== See also ==
- Ala ol Din (disambiguation), sometimes written Alaeddin or Alaed Din
- Aladdin Sane, 1973 album and song by David Bowie
- Arabic name § Common mistakes: misspelling Alāʾ al-dīn as Allāh al-dīn
