= Aladdin (name) =

- Pronunciation: [ʕæˈlæːʔ ædˈdiːn]
- Gender: Male

Origin
- Language: Arabic

Other names
- Variant forms: Ala al-Din; Alā'-ud-Dīn; Alaa el-Din; Alaudin; Alauddin; Allauddin; Aladeen; Alaa Eddin; Alaattin; Allaedin; Alaeddine; Alaeddin; Ala'Aldeen; Ala ad-Dunya wad-Din
- Short form: Alaa

Aladdin (Arabic: علاء الدين, commonly ʻAlāʼ ud-Dīn/ ʻAlāʼ ad-Dīn) (various spellings and transliterations) is a male given name which means "nobility of faith" or "nobility of creed/religion". It is one of a large class of names ending with ad-Din. The name may refer to:

== Given name ==
- Ala al-Din Husayn (died 1161), king of the Ghurid dynasty from 1149 to 1161
- Ala al-Din Atsiz (died 1214), Sultan of the Ghurid dynasty from 1213 to 1214
- Zia al-Din Ali, known as Ala al-Din Ali, last Sultan of the Ghurid dynasty, from 1214 to 1215
- Kayqubad I or Alā ad-Dīn Kayqubād bin Kaykāvūs (1188–1237), Seljuq Sultan of Rûm
- Alauddin Sabir Kaliyari (1196–1291), Sufi saint
- Ala al-Din Abu al-Hassan Ali ibn Abi-Hazm al-Qurashi al-Dimashq, or Ibn al-Nafis (1213–1288), Arab Muslim polymath
- Ata-Malik Juvayni (in full: Ala al-Din Ata-ullah) (1226–1283), Persian historian
- Al al-Din (died 1312), Muslim Persian military expert who served in Kublai Khan's army
- 'Ala al-Din al-Baji (1234 - 1315), a Shafi'i jurist, legal theoretician and theologian.
- Allauddin Khan (c. 1862–1972), Indian musician
- Alauddin Al-Azad (1932–2009), Bangladeshi writer
- Allauddin (1920–1983), Pakistani actor
- Hassan Alaa Eddin (born 1939), Lebanese actor also known as Chouchou
- Alā'-ud-dīn Muhammad Husni Sayyid Mubarak, Egyptian businessman
- Aladdin (1912–1970), full name Aladdin Abdullah Achmed Anthony Pallante, violinist on The Lawrence Welk Show
- Allaedin Ghoraifi (born 1945), Iraqi Twelver Shi'a Marja
- Alaa El-Din Abdul Moneim (born 1951), Egyptian politician
- Alaattin Çakıcı (born 1953), Turkish ultra-nationalist and convicted criminal
- Alaeddine Yahia (born 1981), Tunisian-French footballer
- Aladdin Allahverdiyev (born 1947), Soviet, Russian and Azerbaijani scientist, professor (2001)
- Alauddin (born 1976), Pakistani cricketer
- Alaeddin Boroujerdi, Iranian politician
- Aladdin al-Droubi, Syrian politician

=== Rulers ===
- Alā ud-Dīn Atsiz (died 1156), Khwarazm Shah from 1127 until his death
- Ala ad-Din Tekish (died 1200), Khwarazm Shah from 1172
- Ala ad-Din Muhammad II of Khwarezm (died 1221), Khwarazm Shah from 1200
- Ala ud din Masud, Sultan of Delhi from 1242 to 1246
- 'Alā al-Dīn Muhammad III of Alamut (1211–1255)
- Alaeddin Keykubad (disambiguation), three Seljuk sultans in Anatolia
  - Kayqubad I, 'Alā al-Dīn Kayqubād bin Kaykā'ūs (died 1237)
  - Kayqubad II, 'Alā al-Dīn Kayqubād bin Kaykhusraw (died 1256)
  - Kayqubad III, 'Alā al-Dīn Kayqubād bin Ferāmurz (died 1302)
- Alauddin Khalji (died 1316), a sultan and military leader in India
- Alaeddin Pasha (died 1331 or 1332), son of Osman I and brother of Orhan I, first Grand Vizier of the Ottoman Empire
- Alauddin Ali Shah (died 1342), a ruler in Bengal
- Ala'a ad-Din Kujuk (1334–1345), Mamluk Sultan of Egypt from 1341 to 1342
- Ala-ud-Din Bahman Shah (died 1358), founder of the Bahmani Sultanate on the Indian subcontinent
- Alauddin Riayat Shah of Malacca (died 1488), Sultan of Malacca
- Alauddin Husain Shah (died 1519), Sultan of Bengal
- Alauddin Riayat Shah II of Johor (died 1564), founder of the Sultanate of Johor, grandson of Alauddin Riayat Shah of Malacca
- Alauddin al-Kahar (died 1571), Sultan of Aceh
- Alauddin Alam Shah, regnal name of Tengku Alam Shah (1846–1891), the last Malay sultan of Singapore

== Surname ==
- Ali Alaaeddine (born 1993), Lebanese footballer
- Dlawer Ala'Aldeen (born 1960), Minister of Higher Education and Scientific Research, Kurdistan Regional Government, Iraq*
- Muhammad Aladdin (born 1979), Egyptian writer

== Fictional characters ==
- Aladdin from One Thousand and One Nights
- Aladdin, from the 1992 Disney film Aladdin and its franchise
- Aladdin, a main character of the manga/anime Magi: The Labyrinth of Magic
- Admiral General Aladeen from The Dictator

== See also ==
- Aladdin (disambiguation)
- Arabic name § Common mistakes, Aladdin is sometimes confused with Allah-ad-din
