= Ala ol Din =

Ala ol Din or Ala od Din or Ala-ed-Din (Persian: علاالدين), also rendered as Alaeddin or Alaed Din, may refer to:

- Ala ol Din, Ardabil
- Ala ol Din-e Olya, Kerman Province
- Ala ol Din-e Sofla, Kerman Province
