= Disney's Aladdin (disambiguation) =

Disney's Aladdin may refer to:

- Aladdin (franchise), a Disney media franchise
- Disney's Aladdin (Genesis video game), a 1993 video game
- Disney's Aladdin (SNES video game), a 1993 video game
- Disney's Aladdin (1994 video game), a 1994 Game Gear game
- Disney's Aladdin: A Musical Spectacular, a stage show

== See also ==
- Aladdin (disambiguation)
