= Matt Busch =

American artist

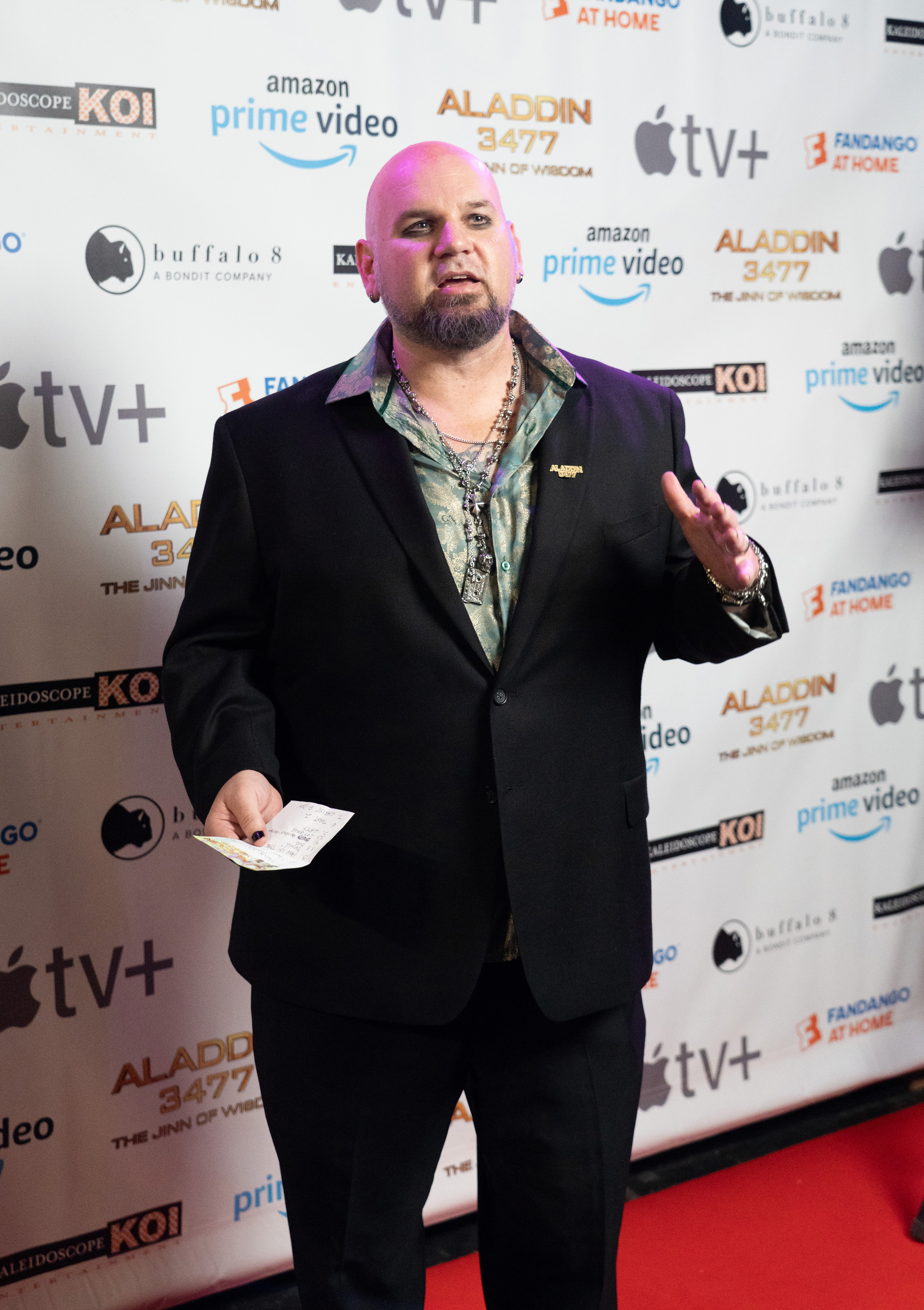
- Busch on the Red Carpet for the release of Aladdin 3477: The Jinn of Wisdom, 2025
- Born: Matthew Stuart Busch; September 22, 1972 (age 53); Lebanon, Pennsylvania, U.S.
- Education: Art Center College of Design
- Occupations: Artist, illustrator, filmmaker, author, writer, director
- Years active: 1994–present
- Notable work: You Can Draw Star Wars, Indiana Jones World Map, Aladdin 3477
- Spouse: Lin Zy (m. 2011, divorced) Casey McGrath (m. 2024)
- Children: 1
- Parent(s): Frederick Busch (father); Peggy Busch (mother)
- Website: mattbusch.com

Matthew Stuart Busch (born September 22, 1972) is an American artist, illustrator, and filmmaker, mostly known for his work with the Star Wars media franchise. He has also illustrated projects for entertainment properties such as Stranger Things, Indiana Jones, and Lord of the Rings, as well as music acts such as Foo Fighters, Mötley Crüe, and Ozzy Osbourne. In more recent years, he has become a media arts professor and independent filmmaker, known for the Aladdin 3477 movie trilogy.

== Early life ==
Busch was born in Lebanon, Pennsylvania on September 22, 1972, to Frederick and Peggy Busch. He grew up in the northern suburbs of Detroit, Michigan, and practiced drawing comic books, playing music instruments, and creating short films with a camcorder. In 1993, he won an award from the Library of Congress for his copyright achievements.

After earning an associate degree from Macomb Community College, he moved to Pasadena, California, where he attended the Los Angeles Art Academy, and studied illustration, film, and entertainment design at the Art Center College of Design. Before earning his Bachelor Degree at Art Center, Busch was classmates with other notable alumni such as Justin Bua, Chris Do, and LeUyen Pham, studying artist Burne Hogarth.

Busch began working in Hollywood illustrating concept art and storyboards for films like Con Air and The Matrix. After living in Los Angeles for nearly a decade, Busch eventually returned to the Northern Detroit area in the early 2000s and founded Kaleidoscope Koi Entertainment LLC, and continues to work on Hollywood projects.

Later in his career, Busch dove into the world of independent filmmaking, eventually writing and directing the Aladdin 3477 trilogy. He has previously taught media arts college courses.

== Career ==
Matt Busch has illustrated numerous official Star Wars posters, books, apparel, and other products since 1994.

Since 1994, Matt Busch has provided art for official Star Wars merchandise. George Lucas has purchased nearly 400 of Busch's drawings and paintings for his own collection, many of which are on display at Lucasfilm's headquarters and Skywalker Ranch.

Early in his career, Busch started illustrating books and playing cards for the Star Wars: The Roleplaying Game. He was the first to illustrate an R7 series Astromech Droid, which has since become a popular series of action figures from Hasbro.

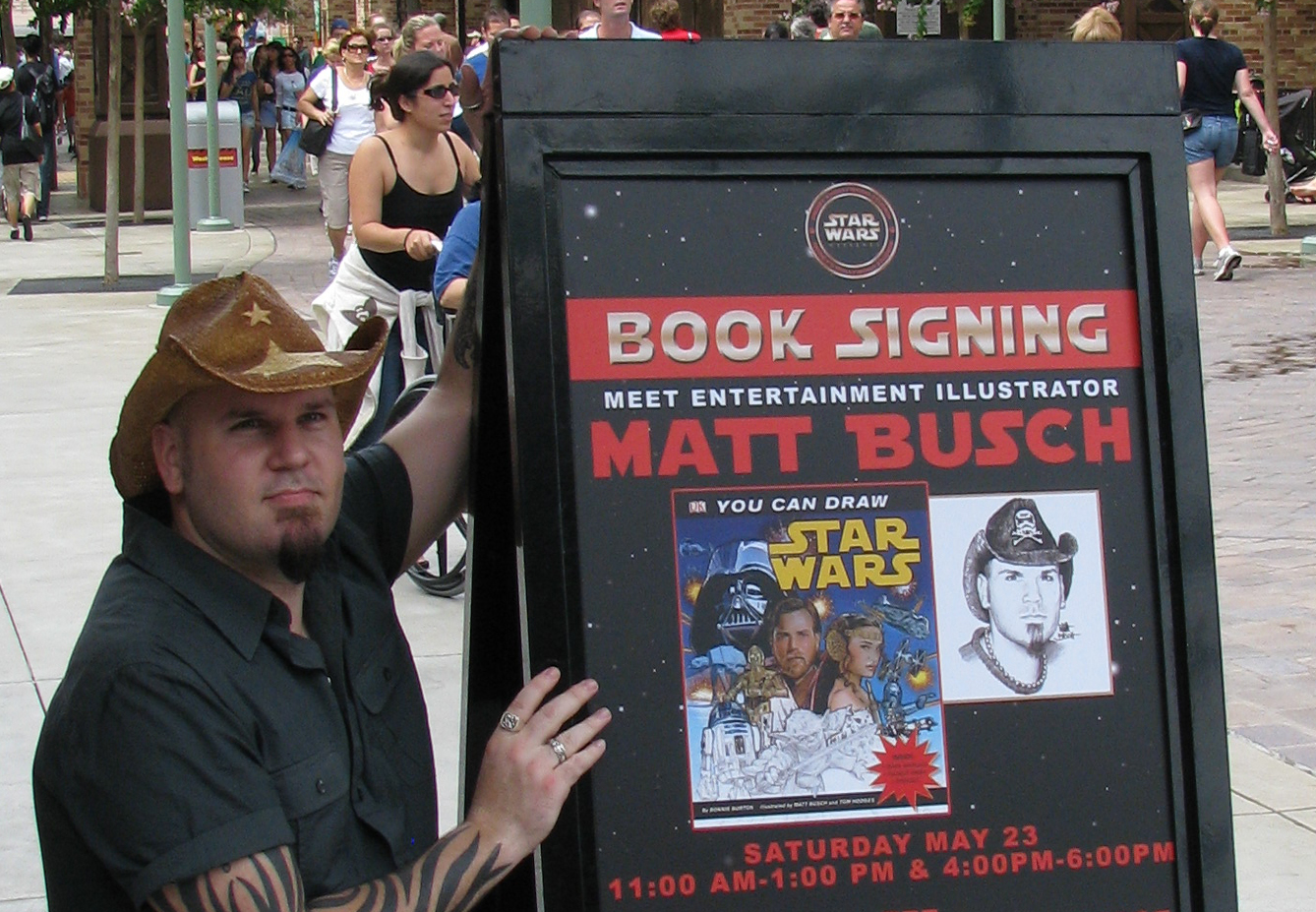
Matt Busch at a book signing in Disney World Hollywood Studios, 2008.

In 1997, Busch illustrated the cover of Star Wars: Tales from the Empire from Bantam Dell, which became a New York Times bestseller. He also began writing and illustrating monthly articles for both the Star Wars Insider and Star Wars Kids magazines.

In 2006, Busch was hired by Lucasfilm to illustrated the Style D One Sheet movie poster for Star Wars: Episode III – Revenge of the Sith, which was designed to be a bookend piece top the original Star Wars "circus poster" illustrated by Drew Struzan and Charles White III. That same year, Busch was the second artist to be inducted as an honorary member of the fictional 501st Legion of Stormtroopers.

In 2007, the You Can Draw Star Wars book from DK Publishing was released, for which Busch produced over 300 illustrations. The book went on to become a New York Times bestseller. Busch is known for his outspoken antics in the You Can Draw Star Wars video series, which is based on the book. The video series was first released on StarWars.com and later released on DVD. Following that, the videos found more success when they were released on MySpace, before being released on YouTube. Volumes Two and Three of the same tutorial series were also released on DVD in subsequent years.

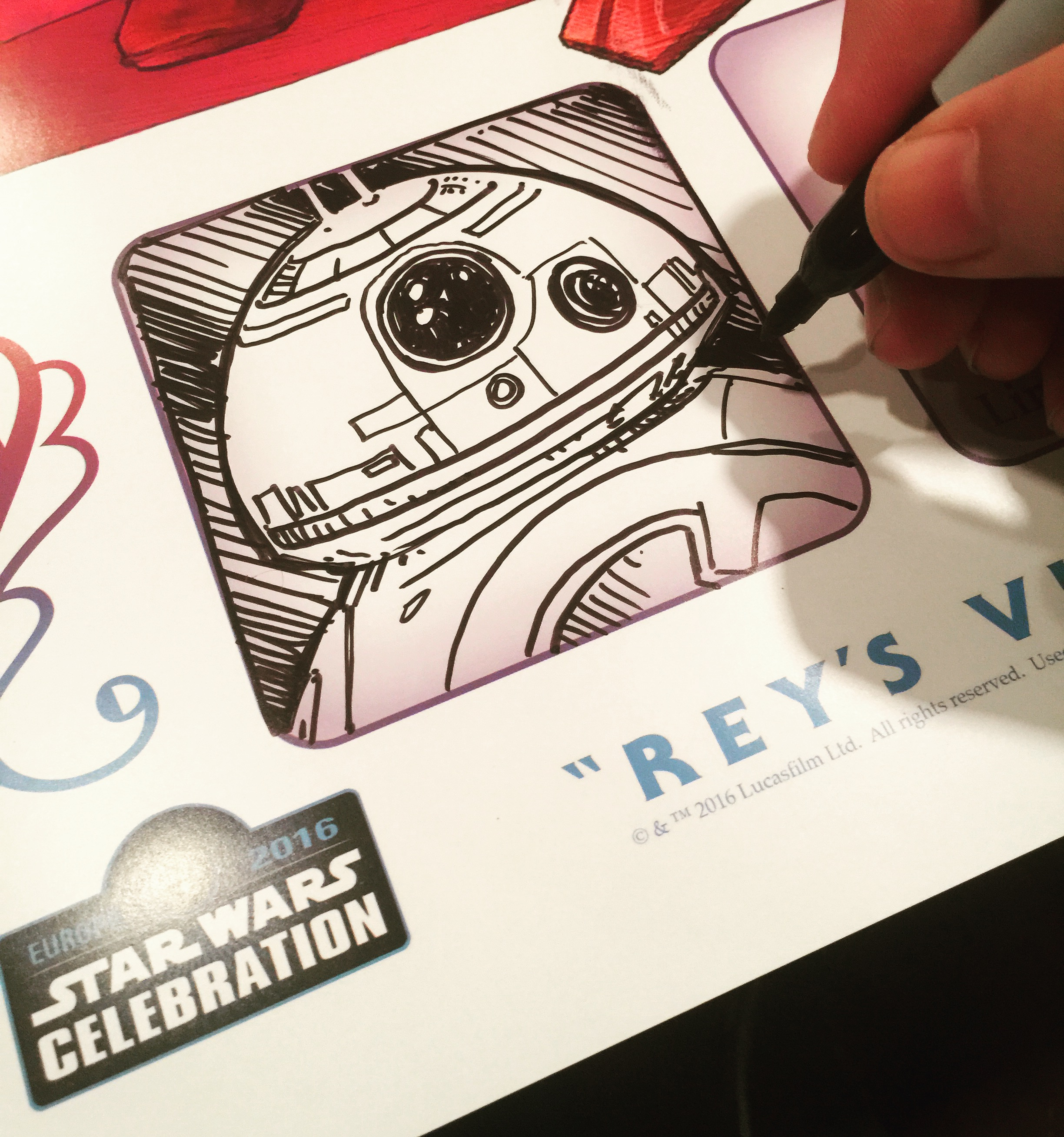
Matt Busch illustrates a remarque sketch of BB-8 on an art print at Star Wars Celebration in London, 2016.

In 2008, Hasbro released a droid action figure named MB-RA-7, which was named after Matt Busch, based on articles he had written for Star Wars Kids magazines. Also that year, Busch became the first Honorary Member of the 501st Legion of Stormtroopers to become an official member with his own TK Stormtrooper armor. His TK number, 3477, is leet for "Matt" written sideways, and later became the year his Aladdin 3477 film trilogy would take place.

In 2009, Lucasfilm solicited Busch to re-illustrate the existing 6 Star Wars film movie posters with a zombie twist, in an effort to help promote the first Star Wars horror novel. He titled the parody series Zombie Wars, and he created Episode I: The Zombie Menace, Episode II: Attack of the Undead, Episode III: Revenge of the Zombies, Episode IV: A New Epidemic, Episode V: The Living Dead Strike Back, and Episode VI: Return from the Grave. Due to the series' success, Busch continued 'zombifying' classic movie posters in a series titled Hollywood is Dead, eventually collecting hundreds of the parody zombie posters into a coffee table art book. The initial Zombie Wars series later became licensed by Fright Rags as popular T shirts.

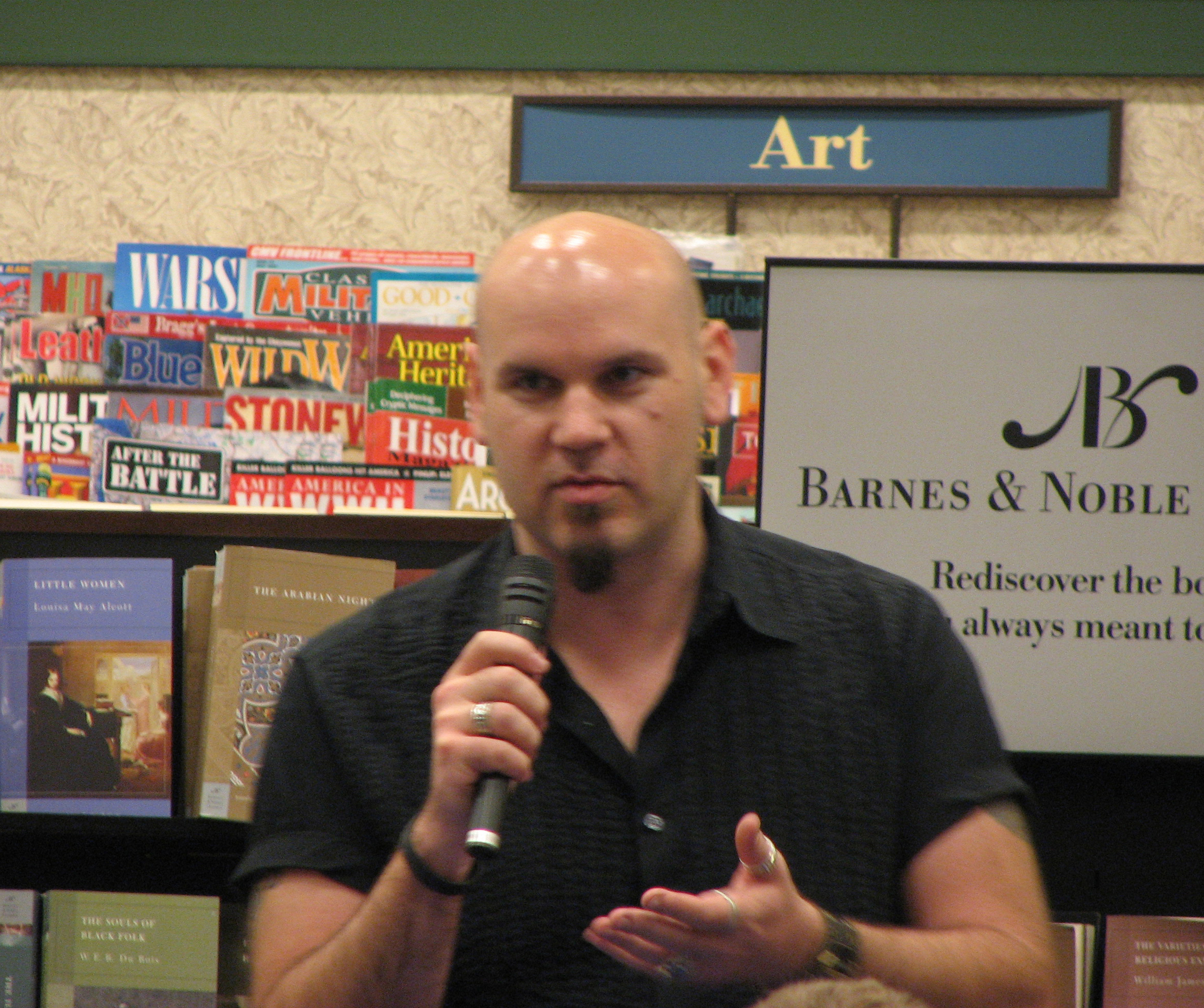
Busch giving a guest lecture at Barnes & Noble in Indianapolis, 2008.

Soon after, Kohl's department stores released T-shirts featuring Busch's Star Wars art.

In 2013, Busch illustrated the CD cover of the original Star Wars Radio Dramas. Based on the source material, Busch also illustrated dozens of trading cards for Topps, including special inserts for Star Wars Insider magazine. That year, Busch and Artist Lin Zy created an animated mashup parody combining Star Wars and Powerpuff Girls. The animated videos titled Power of the Force Girls went viral with millions of views on YouTube.

The following year, Busch illustrated nearly 60 images for the Star Wars: The Empire Strikes Back Illustrated trading cards, including a series of character cards.

Busch became a staple of large Star Wars events like Star Wars Celebrations, JediCon, and Empire Con, producing exclusive limited edition prints for each show. Busch's art was featured in the 2016 Star Wars Calendar.

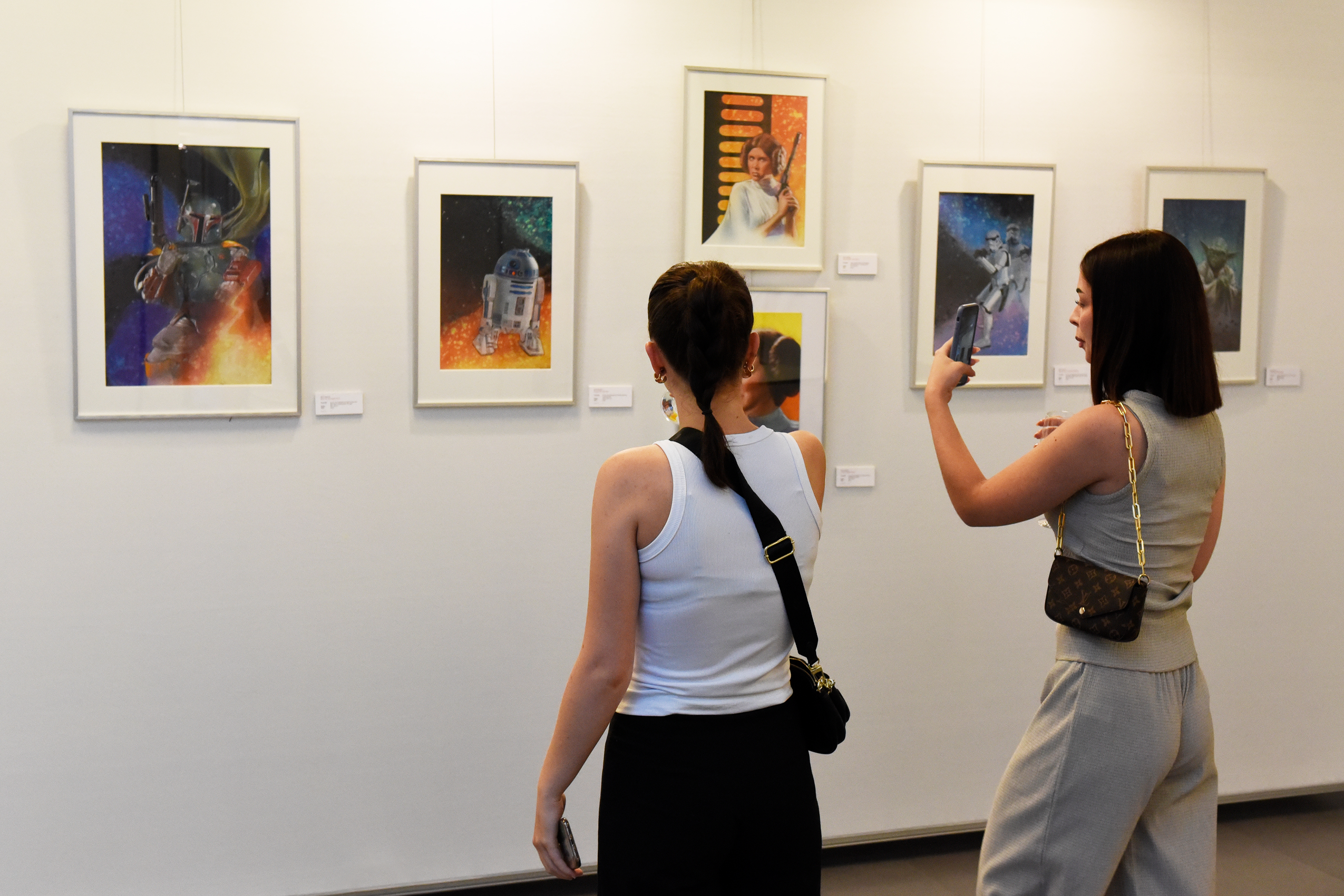
Busch's artwork at a Star Wars art show in Heilbronn, Germany (2024).

In 2021, Disney unveiled a new limited edition print of The Mandalorian, illustrated by Busch. That same year, he was one of 12 Star Wars artists to exhibit in a Star Wars art show at the Galactic Gallery in Dallas.

In 2023, Busch illustrated a 10th anniversary commemorative coin for the Peter Mayhew Foundation. That same year, the foundation gave a significant contribution to Busch's Aladdin 3477 kickstarter.

In 2024, to celebrate 30 years of illustrating official Star Wars art, Busch exhibited 101 drawings and paintings in the Sparkasse Pyramide Gallery in Heilbronn, Germany. That same year, Busch released a new series of tutorial videos on YouTube titled Illustrating Star Wars.

In 2025, Busch was a guest of honor in a Star Wars art show held in a medieval German castle, Schloss Hohenstein in Coberg. Later that year, Busch's work was featured in another Star Wars themed exhibition at the Siegen Art Gallery in Siegen, Germany.

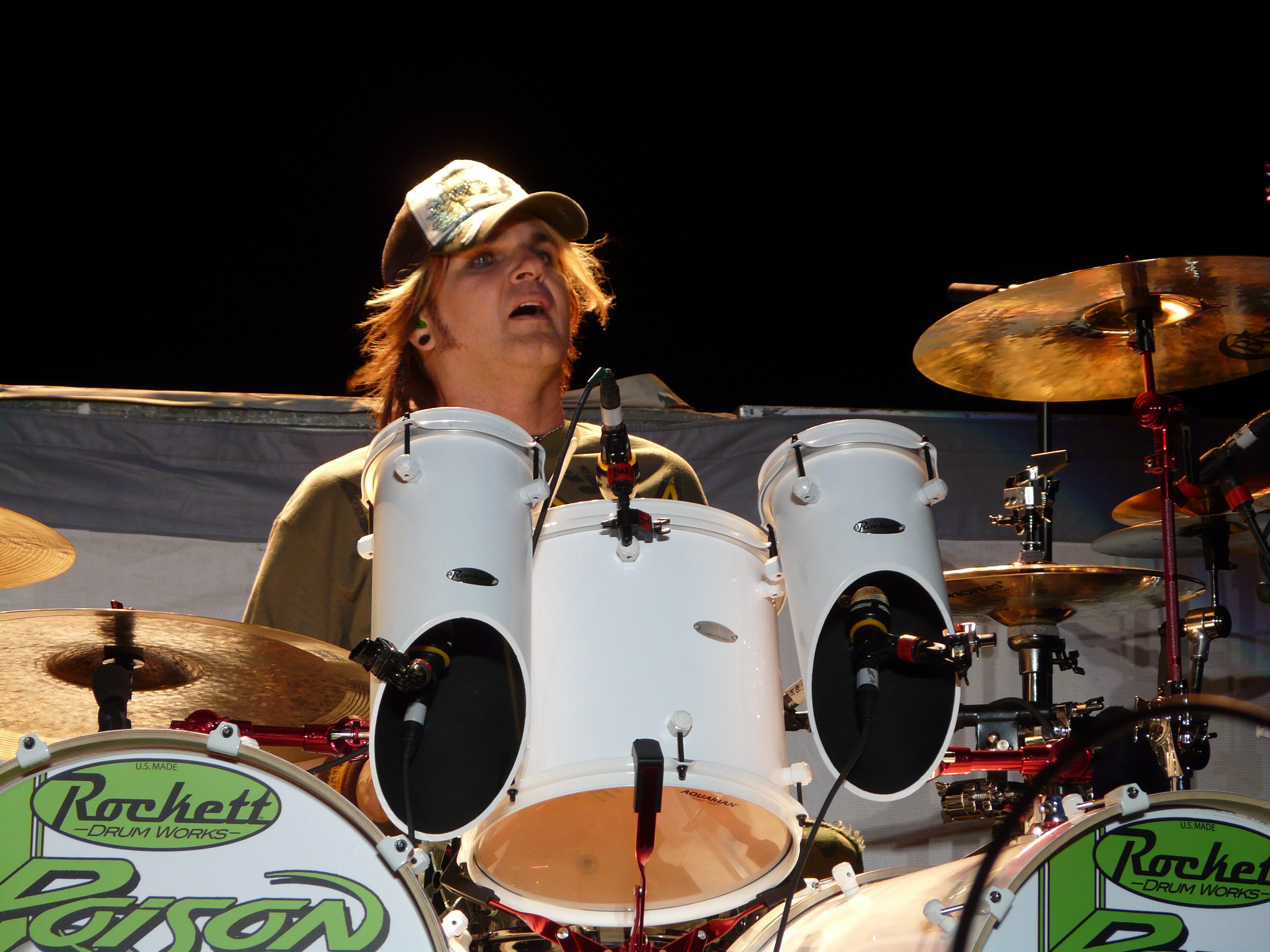
One of Busch's frequent collaborators over the years is drummer Rikki Rockett from the band Poison.

One of Busch's earliest projects in published comic books was illustrating Coven 13 for No Mercy Comics, which was written by Rikki Rockett, drummer of the rock band Poison. The two have worked on a number of projects together, including an animated parody series titled Toke'mon for KNAC Radio in Los Angeles. Busch also created art for Poison's concert screen animations, as well as concert merchandise like T shirts and bandanas. Rikki Rockett also wrote the introduction to Busch's first hardcover art book, Fantastic Visions: The Art of Matt Busch, from Avatar Press.

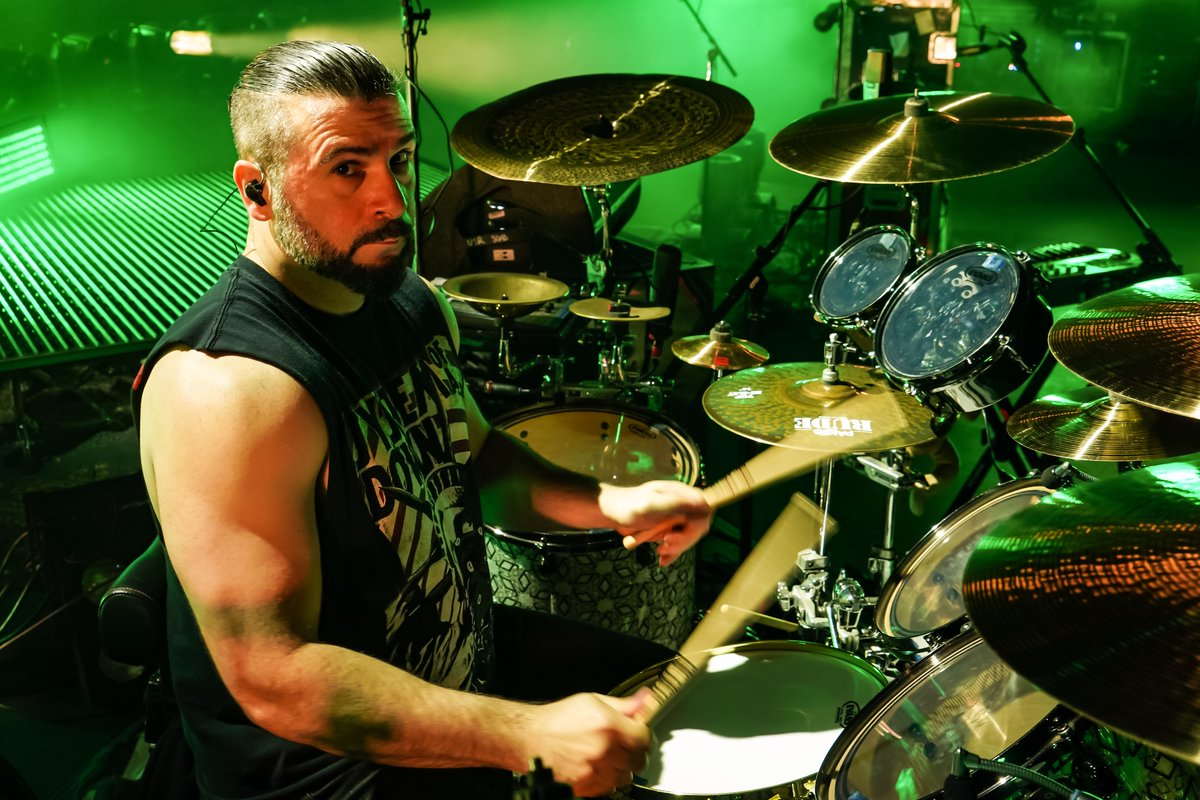
John Dolmayan, drummer of the band System of a Down, wrote the introduction to Busch's art book Pucker: The Seductive Art of Matt Busch.

Busch's second art book, Pucker: The Seductive Art of Matt Busch from SQP Publishing featured a written introduction from drummer John Dolmayan from the nü metal band System of a Down.

In 2008, Busch was a featured special guest at Comic-Con International in San Diego, joining Bernie Wrightson, Al Jaffe, Sergio Aragones, Jim Lee, Ray Bradbury, Joe Hill, and Dean Koontz.

In 2009, Busch illustrated Barack Obama for the cover of the DVD documentary, Becoming Barack: Evolution of a Leader. Busch also produced a video bonus feature on the DVD.

Another property Busch has often illustrated is Indiana Jones.

In 2011, the Indiana Jones World Map was released, a project which Busch spent 3 years working with Lucasfilm to authorize, research and illustrate. The map details all of the locations Indiana Jones has acquired archeological treasures from the films, Young Indiana Jones Chronicles, novels, comics, video games, and Disney Theme Park attractions.

Busch has co-developed apps with his brother Ian, including "Interactive Sketchbook" and "How to Draw (with Artist Matt Busch)".

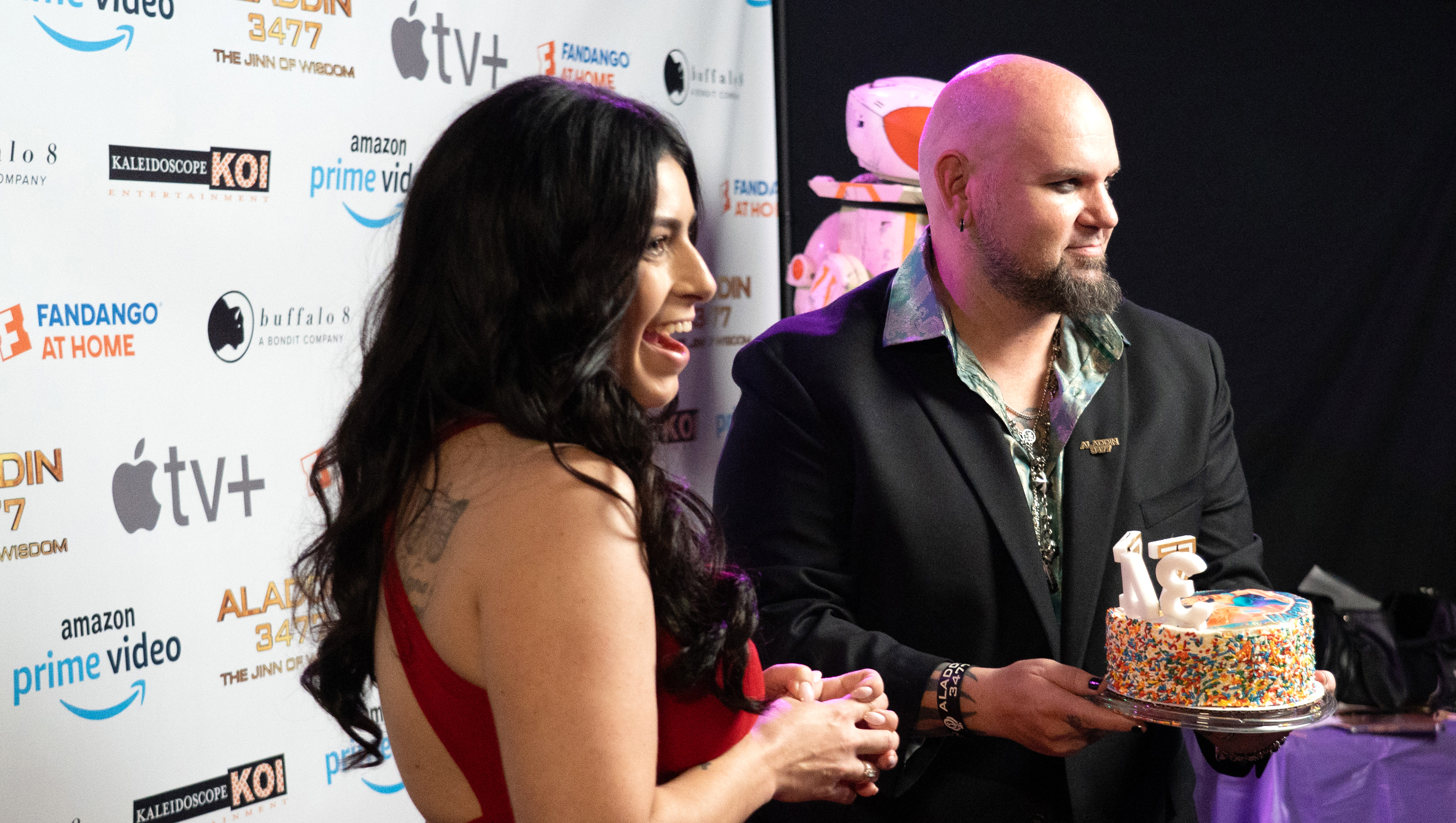
Actress Christi Perovski and Busch at the release of Aladdin 3477: The Jinn of Wisdom, 2025.

In 2025, the film Afterburn was released, based on the Red 5 comic book series which Busch illustrated all of the covers for. The film stars Dave Bautista and Samuel L. Jackson.

Having worked behind-the-scenes for years in corporate studio film productions, Busch eventually gravitated to independent film. In 2006, his first feature-length movie, Conjure, was released straight-to-DVD; a project that he wrote, directed, starred in, and composed the music for. It was also one of the first horror films available on Netflix. The movie broke the highest pre-sale record for movies purchased through HorrorMovies.com.

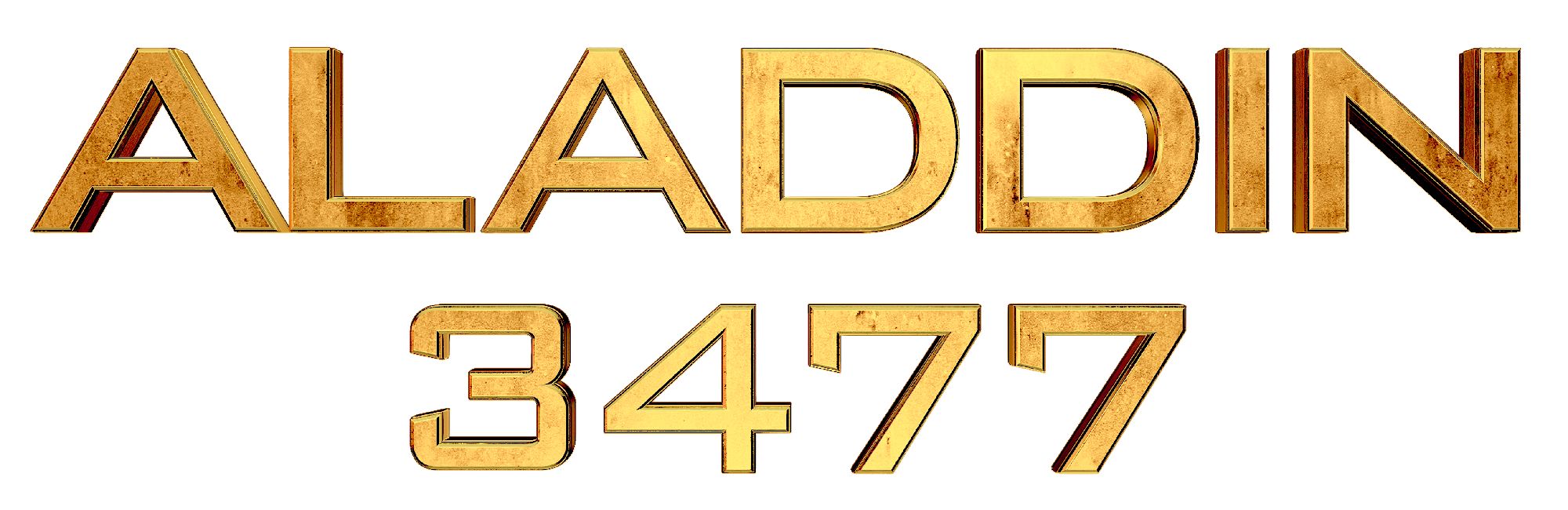
Busch's magnum opus is a trilogy of live action films, Aladdin 3477, which he has written and directed.

In 2009, Busch released a DVD titled Illustration Nation, a documentary of travel adventures including Hollywood, London, and Tokyo.

Busch's arguably most significant work is writing and directing the trilogy of Aladdin 3477 films, based on the classic Arabian Nights tale Aladdin and his Wonderful Lamp. The movies are set in Asia 1,500 years in the future. During the production, the 2018 Hong Kong Business Awards presented Aladdin 3477 with the award for "Most Anticipated Film Project".

The first film, Aladdin 3477- I: The Jinn of Wisdom was released January 3, 2025, on Amazon Prime Video, Apple TV+, and Fandango at Home. The film garnered 3 nominations for Best Independent Science Fiction Film, Best Director, and Independent Movie of the Year for the 7th Annual Film Threat Award This! Awards Ceremony. On January 31st, 2026, Busch attended the ceremony at the Frida Cinema in Santa Ana, California with other cast members to bring home their win for Best Independent Science Fiction Film.

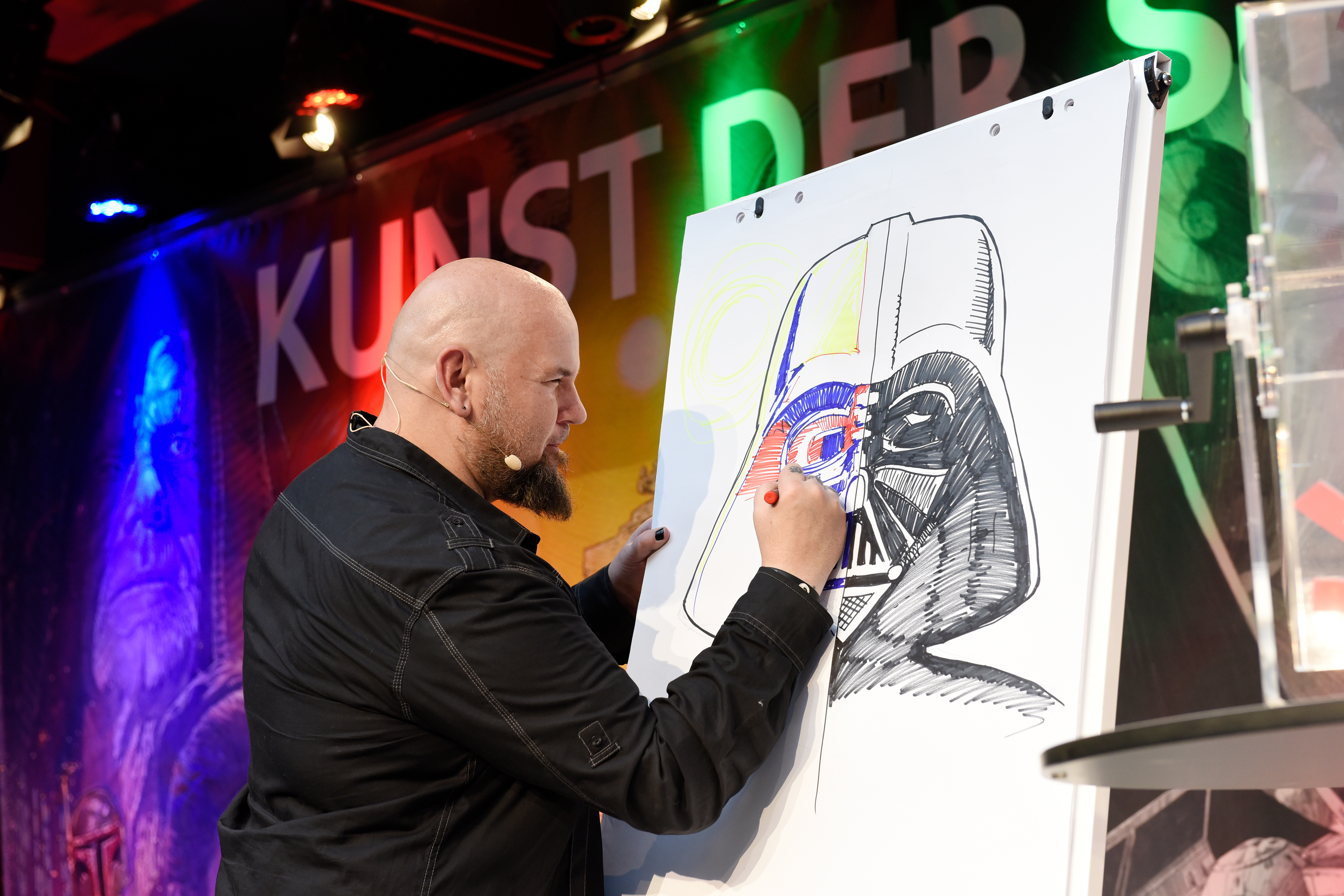
Matt Busch does a live demonstration on stage, drawing Darth Vader at a Star Wars art show in Germany (2024).

Matt Busch has instructed college-level courses at art schools such as the Columbus College of Art and Design and the College for Creative Studies. Currently, he is a professor of Media and Communication Arts and faculty advisor of Creative Imaging and Illustration at Macomb Community College. He teaches a range of courses including painted illustration, figure illustration, and previz storyboarding for film and animation.

== Personal life ==
Busch was married to Lin Zy (née Selestow) in 2011, but divorced in 2019. He later married novelist Casey McGrath in 2024 at the historic Emerald Theatre in Downtown Mount Clemens, Michigan. Busch resides in a home studio in Macomb Township, Michigan with Casey and their son, Beaux.

== Filmography ==
=== Film ===
Year	Title	Role	Notes
1997	Con Air	Storyboard Artist	Theatrical, DVD, Blu Ray, Streaming
1997	Home Alone 3	Storyboard Artist	Theatrical, DVD, Blu Ray, Streaming
1997	How to Be a Player	Storyboard Artist	Theatrical, DVD, Blu Ray, Streaming
1997	The Devil's Own	Storyboard Artist	Theatrical, DVD, Blu Ray, Streaming
1998	Hard Rain	Storyboard Artist	Theatrical, DVD, Blu Ray, Streaming
1999	The Matrix	Storyboard Artist	Theatrical, DVD, Blu Ray, Streaming
1999	The Mummy	Poster Artist	Theatrical, DVD, Blu Ray, Streaming
2002	Star Wars: Episode II- Attack of the Clones	Poster Artist	Theatrical, DVD, Blu Ray, Streaming
2003	Goregoyles: The Holy Terror	Actor	DVD, Streaming
2003	Hulk	Poster Artist	Theatrical, DVD, Blu Ray, Streaming
2005	Star Wars: Episode III- Revenge of the Sith	Poster Artist	Theatrical, DVD, Blu Ray, Streaming
2006	Conjure	Writer, Director, himself	DVD, Streaming
2007	You Can Draw Star Wars	Director, himself	StarWars.com, DVD, YouTube
2008	Illustration Nation	Himself	Documentary, DVD
2008	Becoming Barack: Evolution of a Leader	Director, himself	Bonus Feature / Documentary, DVD
2008	You Can Draw Star Wars: Vol. 2	Director, himself	StarWars.com, DVD, YouTube
2010	You Can Draw Star Wars: Vol. 3	Director, himself	StarWars.com, DVD, YouTube
2025	Aladdin 3477: The Jinn of Wisdom	Writer, Director	Streaming, VOD, Blu ray, DVD

=== Film director ===
Year	Title	Notes
2006	Conjure	Straight-to-DVD
2025	Aladdin 3477: The Jinn of Wisdom	Streaming, VOD, Blu ray, DVD

=== Television ===
Year	Title	Role	Notes
1995	Dr. Quinn, Medicine Woman	Storyboard Artist	
1995	The Nanny	Storyboard Artist	
1996–1997	Everybody Loves Raymond	Storyboard Artist	
1996	Melrose Place	Storyboard Artist	
1996	Millennium	Storyboard Artist	
1996	Early Edition	Storyboard Artist	
1996	In the House	Storyboard Artist	
1996	Nash Bridges	Storyboard Artist	
1997	Martin	Storyboard Artist	
1998	Touched by an Angel	Storyboard Artist	
2015	Local 4 News	Himself	Interview
2019	Stranger Things	Poster Artist	

=== Internet ===
Year	Title	Role	Notes
2024	Illustrating Star Wars	Artist	4-part tutorial videos
2023 – present	Aladdin 3477: Draw This In Your Style	Himself	Aladdin 3477 character art challenges
2022 – present	Livestream Lounge	Himself	Livestream Host
2020 – present	Matt's Class	Instructor	Art tutorial videos
2020–2021	Sketchbook Challenge	Artist	50-part art challenge videos
2010	Hollywood is Dead	Artist	Zombie art videos
2007–2012	How to Draw Star Wars	Himself	22-part tutorial videos

== Published books ==
- The Planet of the Apes RPG ANSA Sourcebook, published by Magnetic Press (2026) (ISBN 1-962413-04-7)
- The Art of Aladdin 3477: The Jinn of Wisdom, published by Kaleidoscope Koi Entertainment, LLC (2025) (ISBN 9780971789074)
- The Star Wars Poster Book, published by Chronicle Books (2025) (ISBN 9780811848831)
- Aladdin 3477: Official Collector's Edition, published by Kaleidoscope Koi Entertainment, LLC (April 2023) (ISBN 9780971789067)
- Afterburn (1) Graphic Novel, published by Red 5 Comics (2021) (ISBN 9781732797628)
- Stranger Things: Visions from the Upside Down, published by Del Rey / Random House (2019) (ISBN 9781984821126)
- The Cyberpunk Nexus, published by Sequart (2018) (ISBN 9781940589183)
- The Art of Film: Star Wars – Volume 2, published by Future Publishing (2017)
- Star Wars – Legends: Tales from the Empire, published by Del Rey / Random House (2017) (ISBN 9780553578768)
- The Art of Painted Comics, published by Dynamite Entertainment (June 2016) (ISBN 9781606903537)
- The Art of Film: Star Wars, published by Future Publishing (2015)
- Hollywood is Dead, published by Planetmatt Entertainment (2014) (ISBN 9780971789036)
- Star Wars Art: Illustration, published by Abrams Books (October 2012) (ISBN 9781419704307)
- The Zombook, published by Graffito Books (2012) (ISBN 9780956028457)
- Conspiracy of the Planet of the Apes, published by Boom Entertainment (2011) (ISBN 9781936393367)
- Matt Busch's Sketchbook (Now With 90% More Bad-Ass!), published by Planetmatt Entertainment (December 2010) (ISBN 9780971789036)
- Star Wars: 1000 Collectibles, published by Harry N. Abrams (October 2009) (ISBN 9780810972919)
- The Worlds of Matt Busch, published by Hermes Press (April 2008) (ISBN 9781932563009)
- Gene Simmons House of Horrors, published by IDW Publishing (February 2008) (ISBN 9781600101366)
- Walt Disney: The American Dreamer, published by Tomart Publications (2008) (ISBN 978091429361-3)
- You Can Draw Star Wars, published by DK Publishing (January 2007) (ISBN 9780756623432)
- Pucker: The Seductive Art of Matt Busch, published by SQP Publishing (September 2006) (ISBN 9780865621442)
- Aprodisia II – Art of the Female Form, published by Aristata Publishing (2006) (ISBN 0975491237)
- Vader: The Ultimate Guide, published by Simon & Schuster (2005) (ISBN 9781847376657)
- Battlestar Galactica: Paradis, published by Simon & Schuster (2004) (ISBN 0743498348)
- Crisis – an Illustrated Screenplay, published by Accomplished Productions (April 2002) (ISBN 0971789002)
- Star Wars: Secrets of Naboo, published by Wizards of the Coast (2001) (ISBN 0786917946)
- Fantastic Visions: The Art of Matt Busch, published by Avatar Press (September 2001) (ISBN 9780970678416)
- Battlestar Galactica: Resurrection, published by Simon & Schuster (2001) (ISBN 0743413261)
- How to Draw Peanuts, published by Scholastic (1999) (ISBN 9780816772476)
- Star Wars Classic Adventures – Volume Four, published by West End Games (1997) (ISBN 0874312922)
- Star Wars: Platt's Smugglers Guide, published by West End Games (1997) (ISBN 0874315085)
- Star Wars: Instant Adventures, published by West End Games (1997) (ISBN 0874315107)
- Star Wars: Tales from the Empire, Published by Bantam Books (1997) (ISBN 0553578766)
- Star Wars: Alliance Intelligence Reports, published by West End Games (1995) (ISBN 0874312604)
- Star Wars: Heroes & Rogues, published by West End Games (1995) (ISBN 0874312582)
- Star Wars: Fantastic Technology, published by West End Games (1995) (ISBN 0874312159)
- Star Wars Adventure Journal Volume 1 No.5-14, published by West End Games (1995) (ISBN 9780874314069)

== See also ==
- Illustrator
- Filmmaking
- Storyboarding
