= Project Aladdin =

Project Aladdin is a multi-faceted cultural initiative launched in March 2009 under the patronage of UNESCO with the aim of countering Holocaust denial and all forms of racism and intolerance, while promoting intercultural dialogue, particularly among Muslims and Jews. The project was initiated by the Fondation pour la Mémoire de la Shoah, a French foundation dedicated to keeping alive the memory of the Holocaust.

The Project's sponsors include former President of France Jacques Chirac, and Prince Hassan bin Talal of Jordan and former German Chancellor Gerhard Schröder, who are also on the Project's "Board of Distinguished Patrons." Other members of the Board include former Indonesian President Abdurrahman Wahid, and former Mauritanian President Ely Ould Mohamed Vall.

More than 500 distinguished figures from Europe, North America and the Muslim world have joined the project by declaring their support for its fundamental text, A Call to Conscience. They include statesmen, parliamentarians, religious figures, intellectuals, historians, academics, authors, artists and civil society actors of different faiths and cultures.

In its effort to promote knowledge as a bridge between cultures, the Aladdin Project has set up a multilingual website in English, French, Arabic, Persian and Turkish that contains information on the Holocaust, as well as a basic introduction to Jewish faith, history and culture and an overview of historical relations between Jews and Muslims in different countries.

A tenet of the project is its online library, where books in Arabic and Persian can be downloaded free of charge. The first collection includes the first-ever translation into Arabic and Persian of such classics as Anne Frank's Diary and Primo Levi's Survival in Auschwitz. In line with the project's expressed purpose of helping to "bring about a dialogue based on knowledge and mutual respect," the fast-expanding library is set to also include works of authors from the Muslim world translated into English and French.

== Launch Conference at UNESCO ==
The Aladdin Project was officially launched on March 27, 2009, at the UNESCO headquarters in Paris. In an unprecedented event, the Heads of State of Egypt, Morocco, Qatar, Tunisia and Bosnia and the governments of Turkey and Spain sent high-level representatives to join Senegalese President Abdoulaye Wade, former French President Jacques Chirac and other dignitaries from Europe and the Muslim world to hail the Aladdin Project, reject Holocaust denial, and embark on a Jewish-Muslim dialogue based on mutual knowledge and mutual respect.

The conference was opened by UNESCO Director General Koichiro Matsuura, who praised the project, saying that "UNESCO offers its support to this initiative, in the hope that it will enhance in a durable manner educational means for peace and tolerance." David de Rothschild, President of the Shoah Memorial Foundation, outlined the broad themes of the project and its objectives. Other speakers included President Wade of Senegal, André Azoulay, Counselor to the King of Morocco, Ahmed Toufiq, Minister of Islamic Affairs, both representing King Mohammed VI, Qatar's Khalid bin Muhammad al-Atiyah, Minister for International Cooperation, representing Sheikh Hamad bin Khalifa Al Thani, the Emir of Qatar, Egypt's Farouk Hosny, Minister of Culture, representing President Hosni Mubarak, Tunisia's Prof. M'hamed Hassine Fantar representing President Zine El Abidine Ben Ali, and Bahrain's Princess Haya Rashed Al-Khalifa, a former president of the United Nations General Assembly. Also present on behalf of their respective governments were Mustafa Ceric, the Grand Mufti of Bosnia, and Professor İlber Ortaylı, a distinguished Turkish historian and president of the Topkapı Museum in Istanbul.

Other notables who came from far away to be present at the conference included Abdou Filali-Ansari representing Aga Khan IV, former Tunisian Prime Ministers Hédi Baccouche and Mohammed Mzali, Egypt's Aly El Samman, a veteran proponent of interfaith dialogue and advisor to the late President Anwar El Sadat, Ahmed Aboutaleb, the Mayor of Rotterdam, Gul Khan, the Lord Mayor of Nottingham, Iranian theologian Ayatollah Ahmad Iravani, Hélé Béji, president of the International College of Tunis, and Pakistani-born British Mufti Abduljalil Sajid.

In a message to the conference read on his behalf by French Justice Minister Rachida Dati, President Nicolas Sarkozy of France said, "The strength of the Aladdin Project is to extend a hand to those who have been handicapped by prejudices, ignorance, or simply a lack of accessible information; to expose the lies and clear up the misunderstandings; to open up a new horizon for our common future. I share, unreservedly, this fundamental intuition of the Aladdin Project, for I am convinced that peace between peoples can only be based on mutual understanding and respect, and these are acquired in knowing and interacting with the other side."

Former American President Bill Clinton praised Project Aladdin, saying that it "has the potential to play a vital role in countering denial with facts and putting a human face on something that otherwise might seem too terrible to believe."

"Project Aladdin's focus on encouraging an intercultural dialogue based on mutual knowledge and mutual respect will help ensure that the 21st century is defined not by our differences, but by our common humanity. That is the key to a peaceful future," the former president concluded.

== Current events ==
Project Aladdin was in the news in 2009 for its criticism of Hezbollah, citing a "campaign of intimidation" in relation to the use of The Diary of Anne Frank in a Lebanese private school.

Project Aladdin celebrated its 10th anniversary on 29 May 2017 with a Gala Dinner attended by UNESCO DG Irina Bokova and former President Nicolas Sarkozy. At the dinner Sheikh Mohamed Bin Issa Al Jaber was awarded the 2017 Prize for the Dialogue of Cultures.
