= Aladdin 3477 =

Trilogy of films by Matt Busch

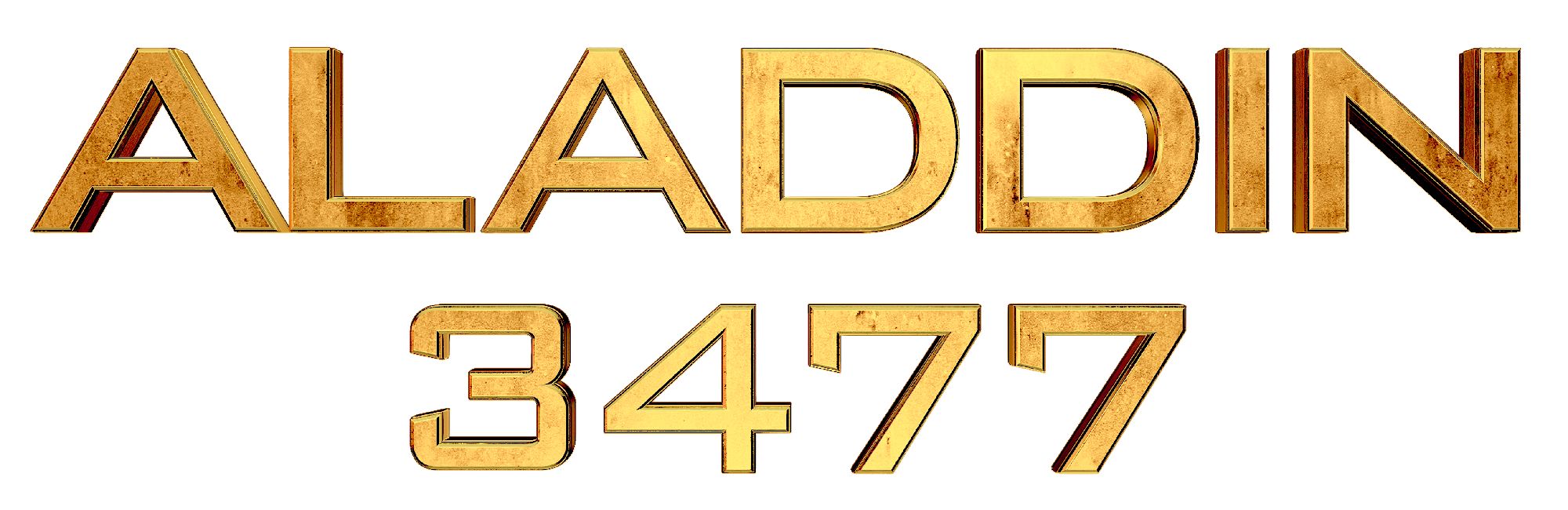
- Created by: Matt Busch
- Original work: Aladdin and His Wonderful Lamp
- Owners: Kaleidoscope Koi Ent., LLC
- Years: 2010–present

Print publications
- Books: Aladdin 3477: Official Collector's Edition (2023); The Art of Aladdin 3477: The Jinn of Wisdom (2025)

Films and television
- Film: Aladdin 3477- I: The Jinn of Wisdom (2025)

Miscellaneous
- Toy: Fidgi Designer Toys

Official website
- aladdin3477.com

Aladdin 3477 is a media franchise created by American artist and filmmaker Matt Busch. It is based loosely on the story of Aladdin and the Magic Lamp from One Thousand and One Nights and is planned as a trilogy of live-action science fiction films. The first film, Aladdin 3477: The Jinn of Wisdom, was released in January 2025. The trilogy is set in the year 3477 and follows a futuristic version of Aladdin.

== Story ==
=== Setting ===
The story is set in the year 3477 and takes place in a futuristic version of Asia. It is loosely based on the Aladdin and His Wonderful Lamp story from One Thousand and One Nights and incorporates elements of science fiction and cyberpunk. The year 3477 was chosen by Busch as a reference to his association with the 501st Legion and as a form of leet.

=== Plot ===
In futuristic Hong Kong, Aladdin is an orphan who makes a living as a con artist and thief with his robot companion, FIDGI. He encounters Princess Kamala Shivali, a member of the Indian royal family, and becomes involved in events surrounding her return to India.

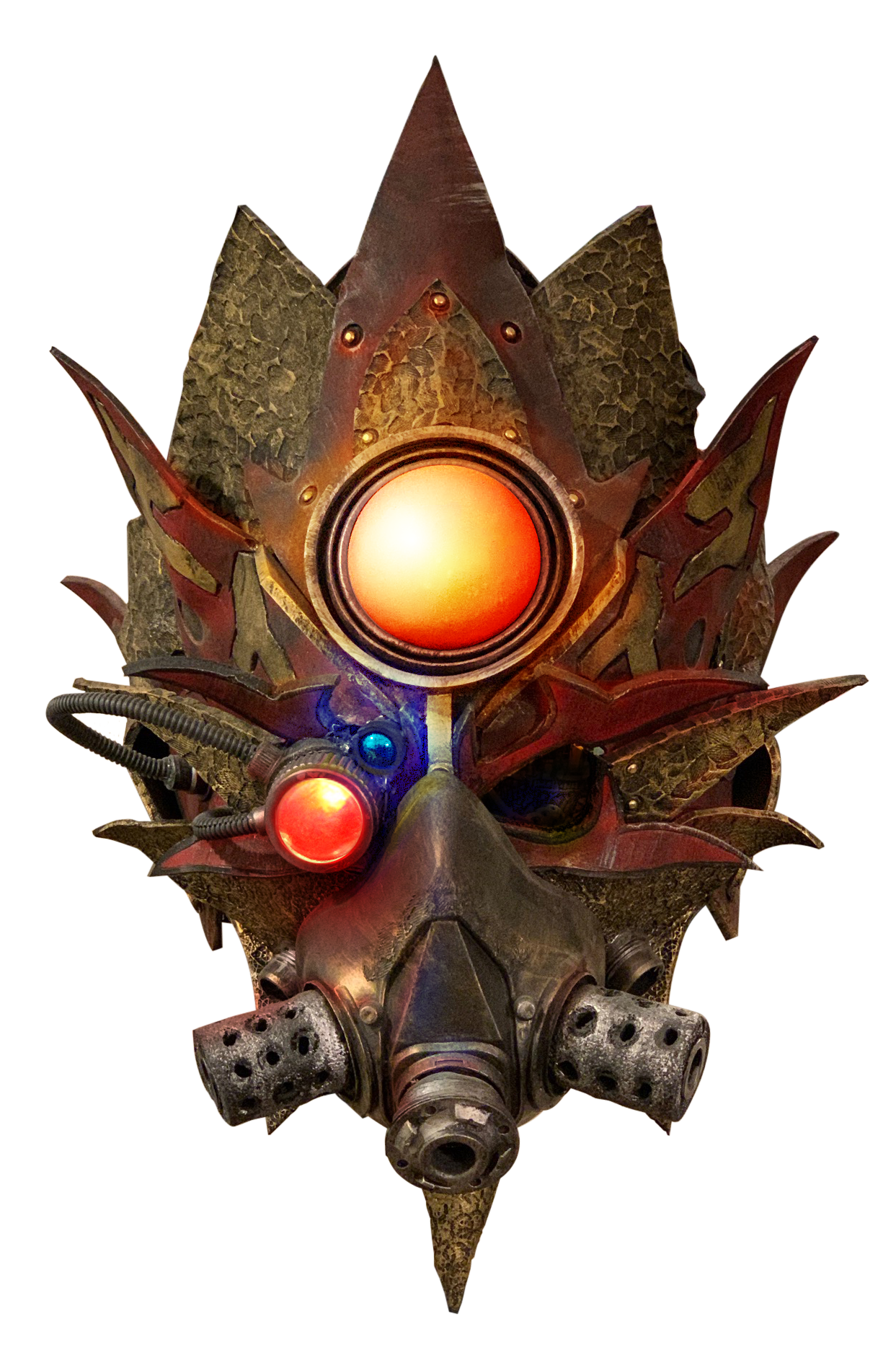
The mask of Lochan Shyamal, the Nano Dragon posing as Grand Vizier to the Sultan.

Kamala is held at her palace under the authority of Lochan Shyamal, the Grand Vizier, who seeks to overthrow the Sultan using nanotechnology. Aladdin later travels to the Kingdom of Cambodia to recover a legendary lamp and is accompanied by Oomi. During their journey, they encounter a sage who claims to be the jinn of wisdom and offers Aladdin a wish.

The group subsequently travels through Thailand, where Aladdin confronts aspects of his past and must decide whether to pursue power or remain loyal to Oomi.

=== Style ===
Busch has cited Star Wars as an influence on Aladdin 3477 and has described the trilogy as incorporating elements associated with The Lord of the Rings, Hindu mythology, and Asian visual motifs. The character of Aladdin was also influenced by Jack Burton from Big Trouble in Little China and Han Solo from Star Wars.

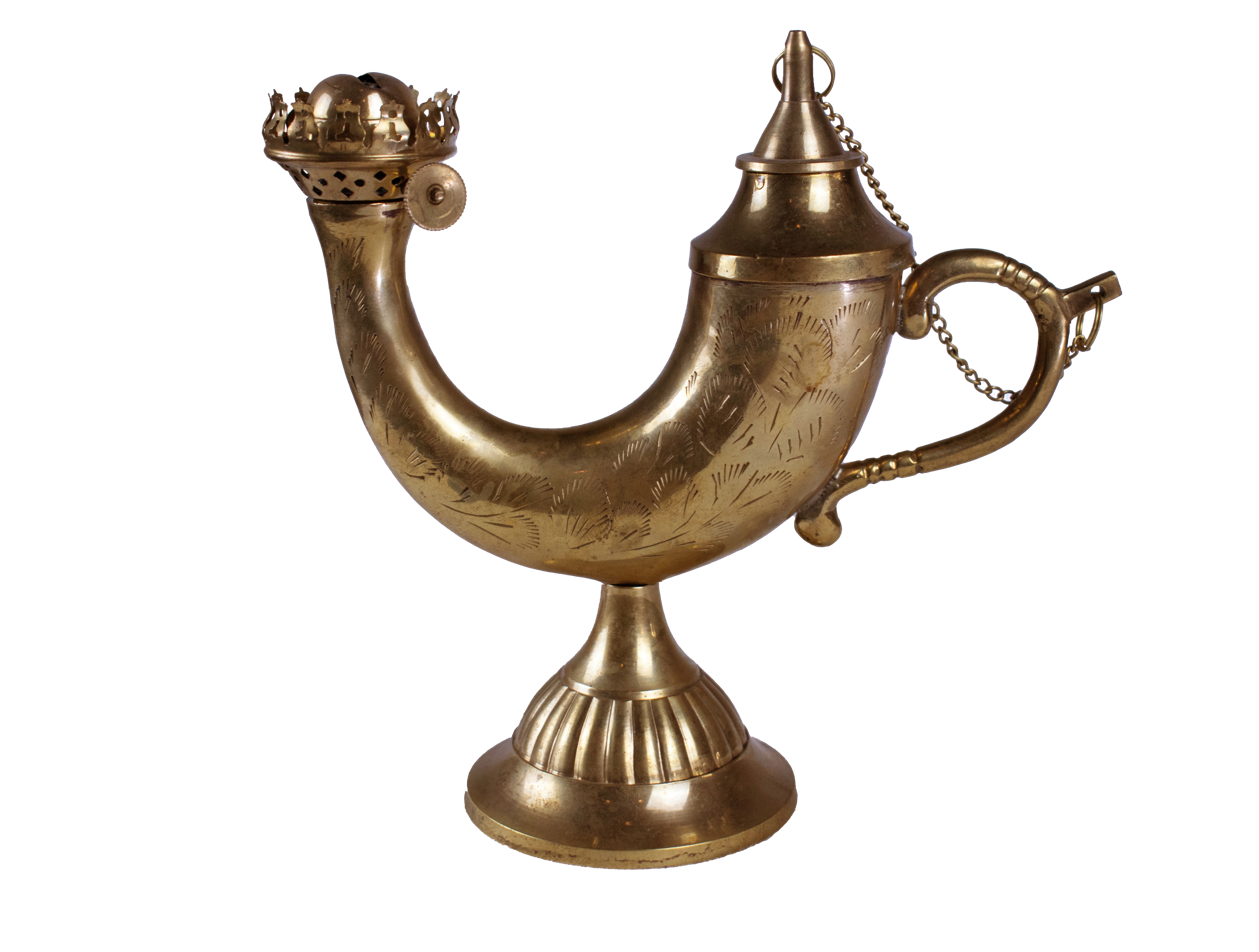
The mysterious oil lamp of the Jinn of Wisdom.

Unlike some adaptations of the Aladdin story, the films use the term jinn rather than genie and introduce original characters including Oomi, Brej, and the robot FIDGI.

== Production ==
=== Early development ===
Busch began developing the concept for Aladdin 3477 in the early 1990s while studying at Macomb Community College. The project originated as an illustrated graphic novel titled Kastar Shandax. Busch also designed an early version of the Skysail for a student project at the ArtCenter College of Design.

Before developing the film, Busch worked on projects associated with films including Con Air and The Matrix and produced artwork for properties including Star Wars, Indiana Jones, Stranger Things, and The Lord of the Rings.

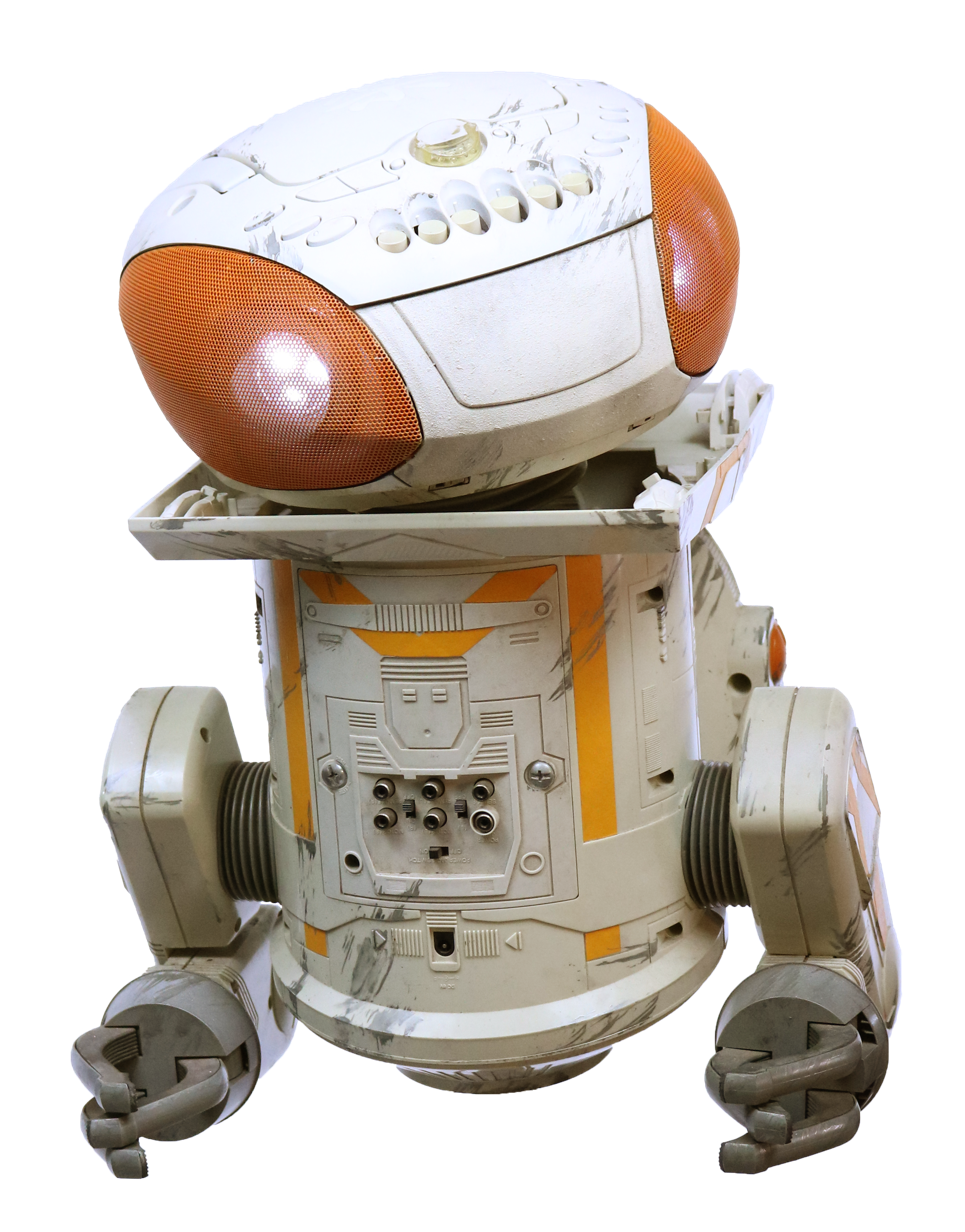
Aladdin's built his sidekick robot FIDGI out of junk appliances of the past.

=== Pre-production ===
Busch set out to begin pre-production for the Aladdin 3477 trilogy in 2010, 15 years before the first film was released. While the look of Aladdin 3477 has a Star Wars feel set in Asia, Busch designed the adventure to be reminiscent of Indiana Jones, and the overall trilogy epic in scope like Lord of the Rings.

Prior to filming with actors, Busch traveled throughout India, China, Hong Kong, Thailand, and the Kingdom of Cambodia to film background plates. Busch took inspiration from the Taj Mahal for a castle in the movie.

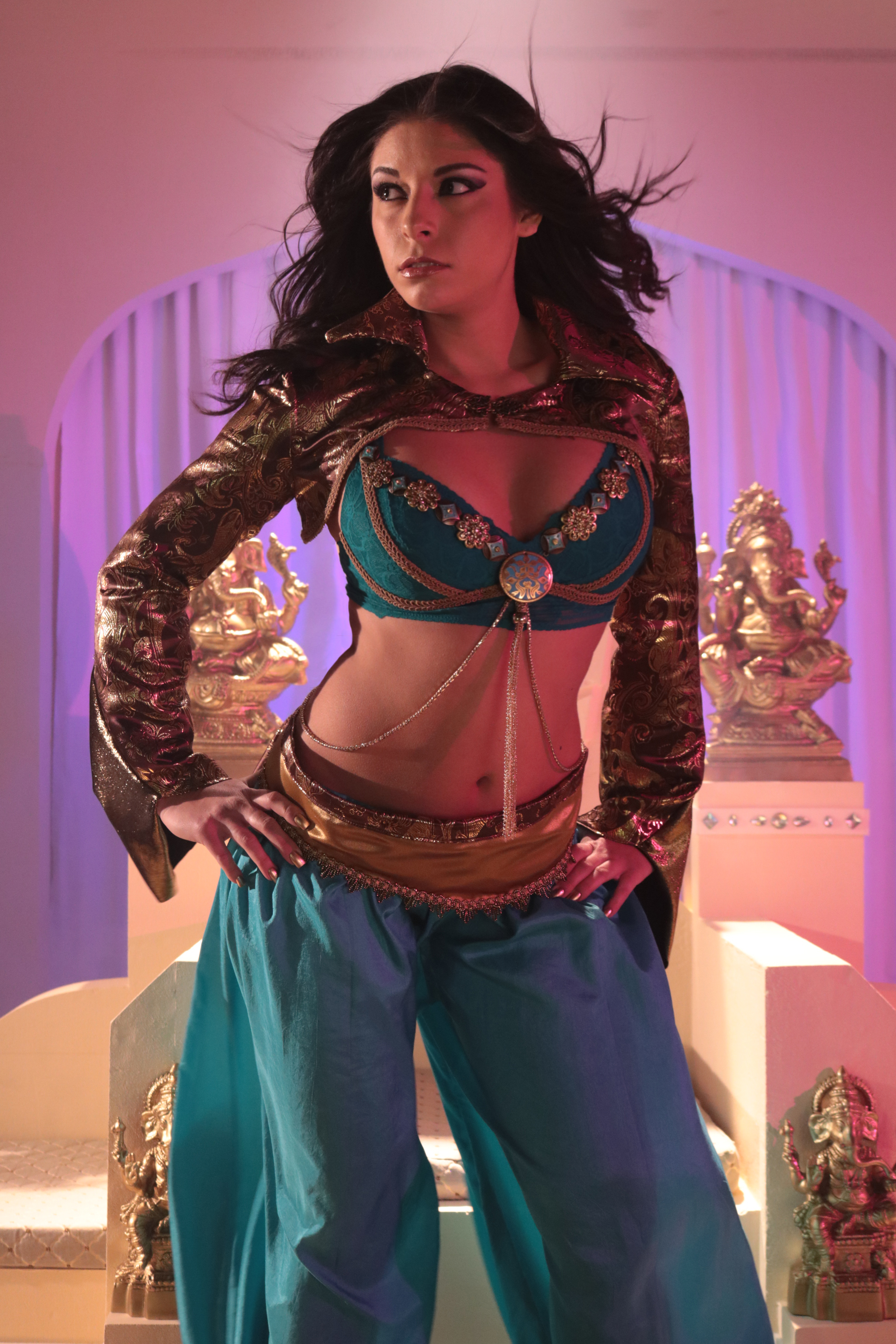
Actress Christi Perovski cast as Princess Kamala Shivali of India.

Having experience creating concept art and previz for larger studio films, Busch painted dozens of production paintings and illustrated storyboards for each shot in the Aladdin 3477 trilogy. In designing Aladdin's sidekick robot Fidgi, Busch determined that Aladdin would build his own robots out of junk from the past, Fidgi's head is a modern-day 90's style portable radio / CD player.

A worldwide open casting call was set up for Aladdin 3477 and received more that 10,000 applicants. After narrowing down 100 candidates for the part of Princess Kamala, Christi Perovski's audition won her the lead role. Lin Zy was cast as the character Oomi because of her expertise in multiple styles of martial arts. While Busch purposely built a cast of unknowns, seasoned actor Jerry Hayes was cast as the Sultan in a more serious role.

=== Principal photography ===
The three films were produced independently and filmed over a period of approximately five years. Scenes for the three films were shot out of chronological order. The sequences involving actors were filmed in Michigan.

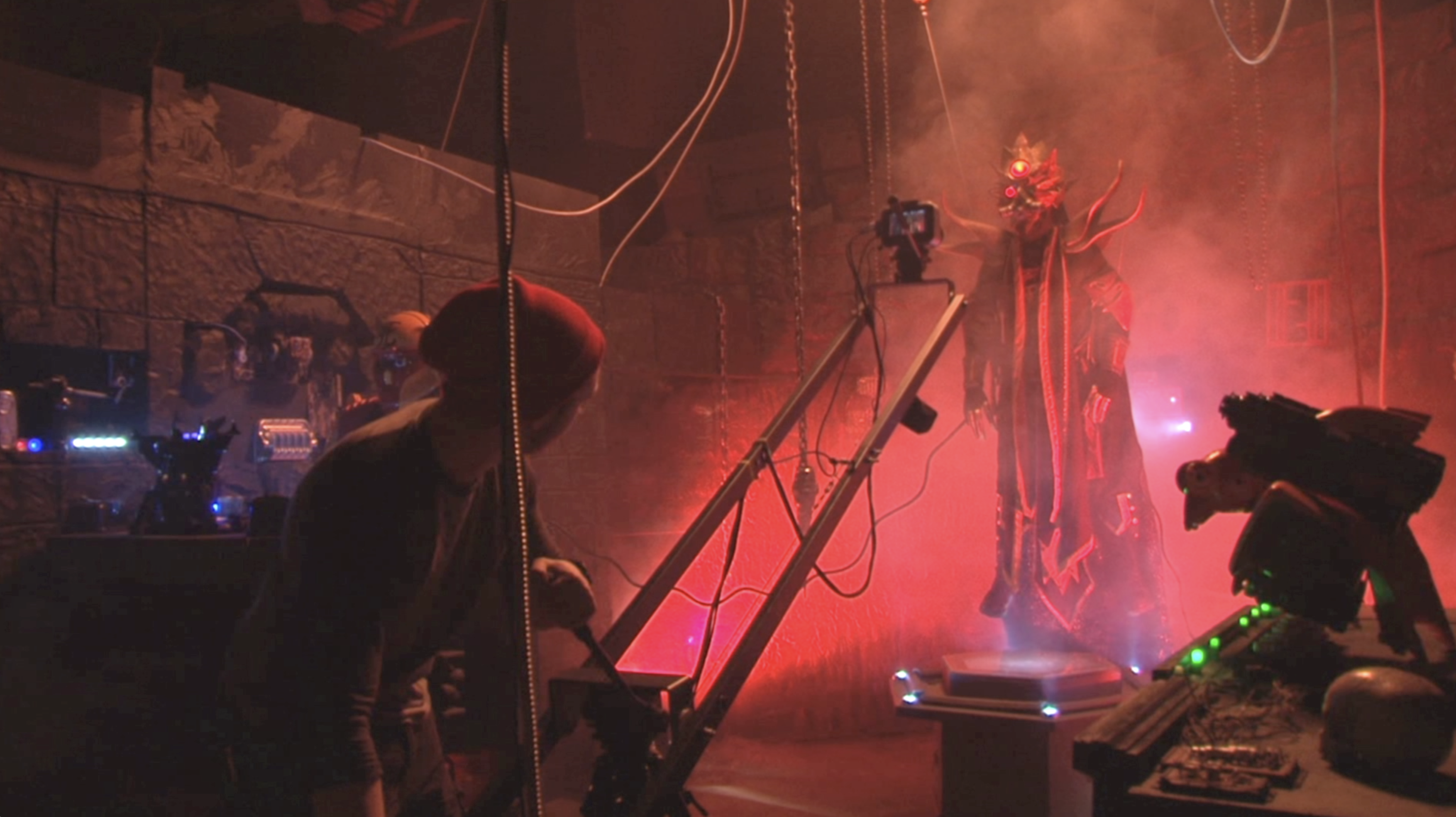
Alexander Jacobson films Lochan Shyamal (Brian Dalling) at the Kaleidoscope Koi Soundstage.

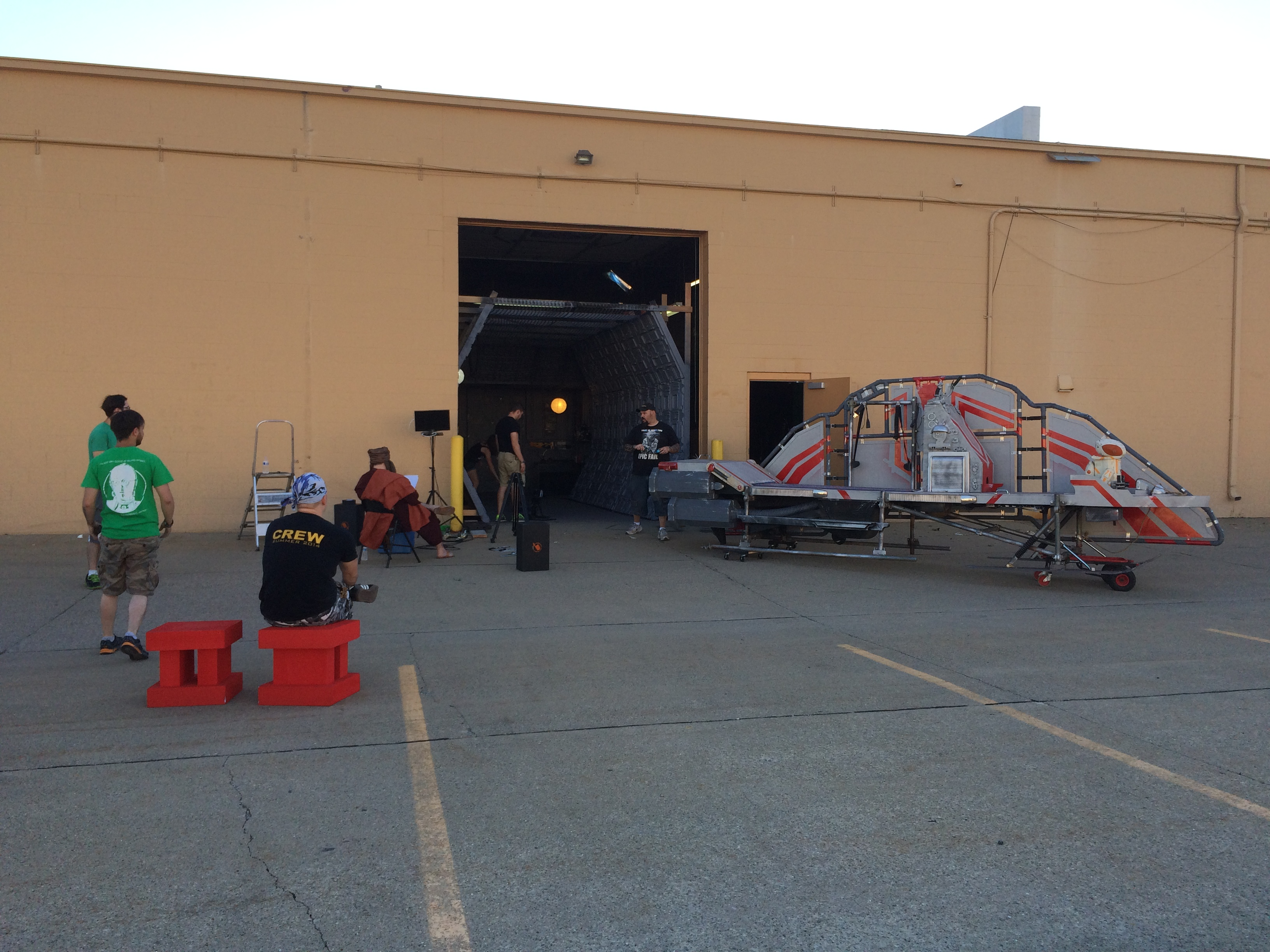
The full size Skysail on the backlot at the Kaleidoscope Koi Soundstage.

The production used Blackmagic Design cameras, including the Cinema Production Camera 4K and URSA Mini Pro. Desert scenes were filmed at the Silver Lake Sand Dunes in Michigan, while most interior sets were constructed at a soundstage in Clinton Township. The production also used outdoor sets and green-screen setups at the soundstage. Because the soundstage had limited space, sets were constructed and dismantled during production to make room for subsequent sets. The production's largest indoor set was a throne room modeled on the Taj Mahal, which took 11 months to construct.

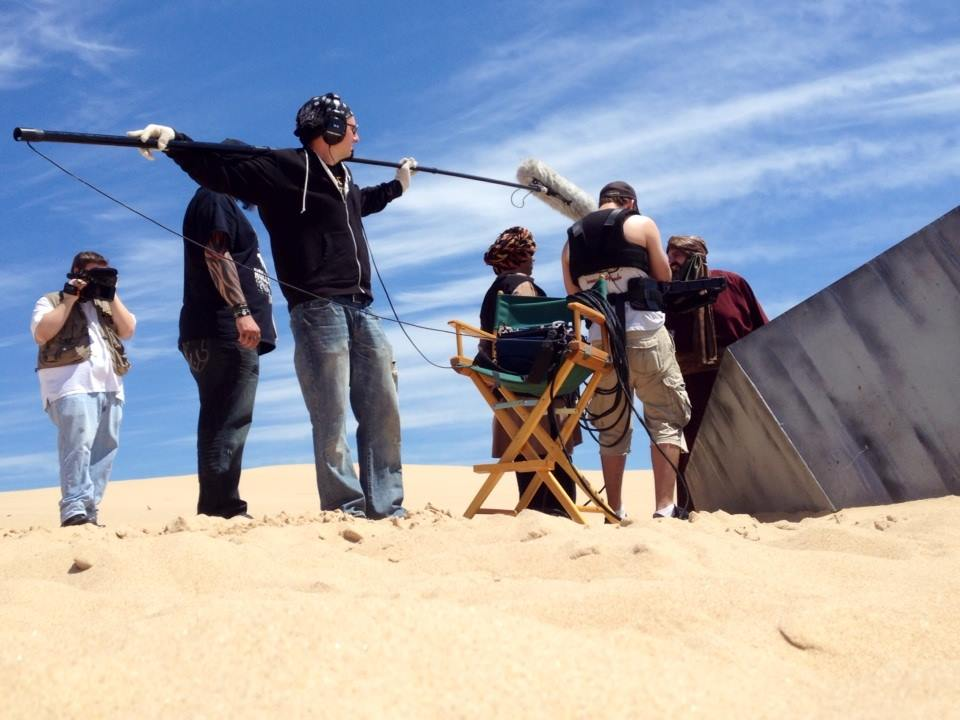
Sound Designer Ric Viers runs the boom mic on location for Aladdin 3477: The Jinn of Wisdom.

=== Music ===
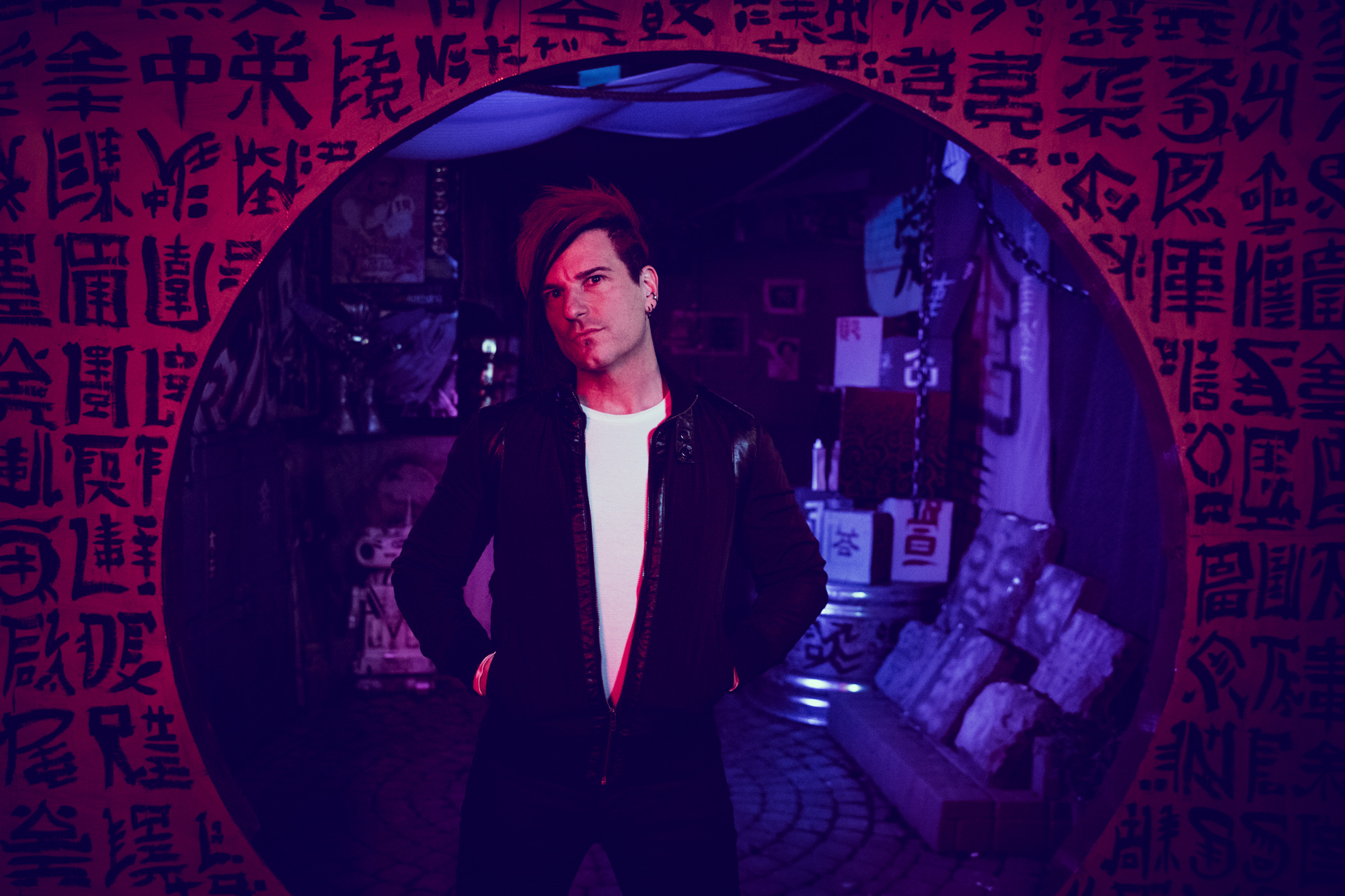
Musician Klayton on the Hong Kong set of Aladdin 3477

Aladdin 3477 features the music of Celldweller, an electronic rock project by multi-instrumentalist Klayton. Matt Busch licensed production packs Sonix and Transport, which were produced by Klayton through his company Refractor Audio. Klayton and Busch have collaborated on other projects, including Busch's comic book cover illustration for Celldweller's End of an Empire. Klayton's electronic/new wave moniker Scandroid filmed the music video for "Eden" on the Aladdin 3477 Hong Kong Marketplace set.

=== Visual effects ===
Post Production for the first Aladdin 3477 film took 4 years to complete.Director of Photography Alex Jacobson and First Assistant Director Steven Pankotai used in-camera practical effects for the visuals. Busch preferred to use classic Hollywood tricks with mechanical puppets and forced perspective miniatures rather than animated visuals. In total, 688 visual effects shots were composited beyond what was achieved in-camera.

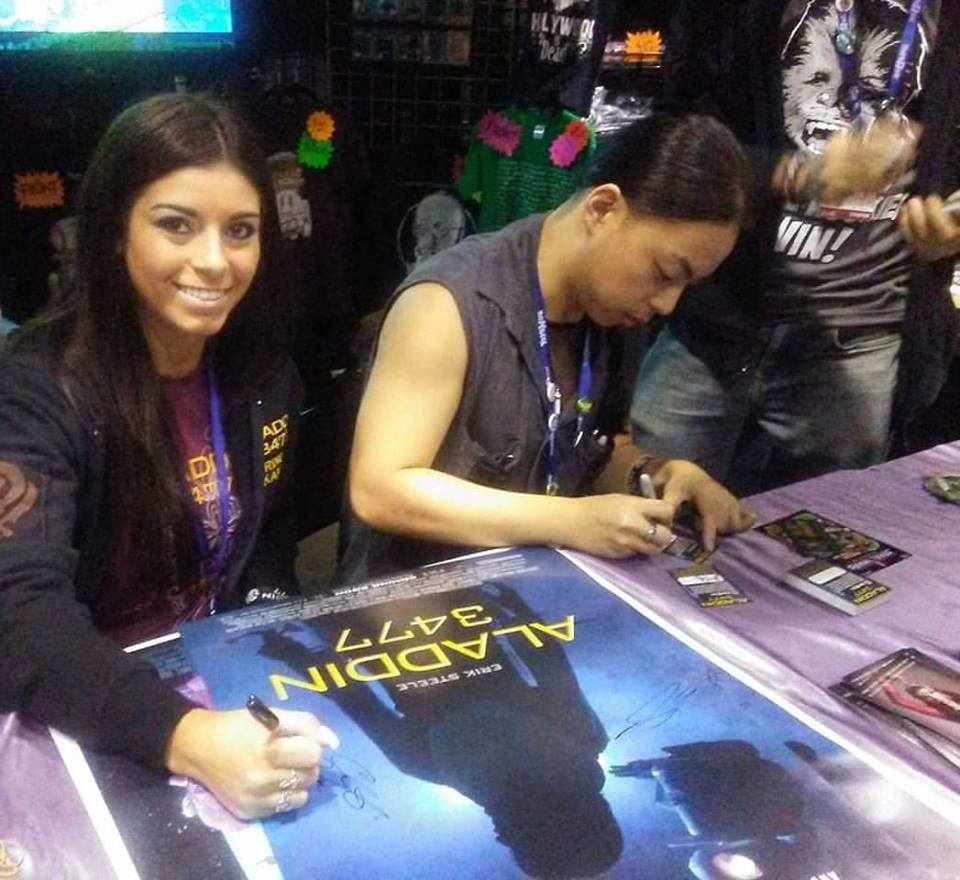
Actors Christi Perovski and James Polony signing Aladdin 3477 movie posters at the Star Wars Celebration in Orlando, Florida. (2017)

== Marketing ==
Matt Busch first shared public footage of Aladdin 3477 in 2015 at Full Sail University for their annual Hall of Fame event. In subsequent years, Busch would set up large exhibitor booths at Star Wars Celebration shows where fans could view clips and meet with cast and crew.

To help hype the release of the first Aladdin 3477 film, The Jinn of Wisdom, Busch ran a successful Kickstarter campaign, which was fully-funded in 8 hours, ending up generating over 6 times its initial goal. Busch began producing merchandise for the film, including books, toys, clothing, posters, and more. One of the high tier Kickstarter rewards was the role of Executive Producer, to which Peter Mayhew's name was attached by the Peter Mayhew Foundation. Some kickstarter backers also experienced a prescreening film with the director in his personal home theater. At the end of the Kickstarter campaign, Busch hosted a 24 hour Livestream Lounge event to help drum up support in the final hours.

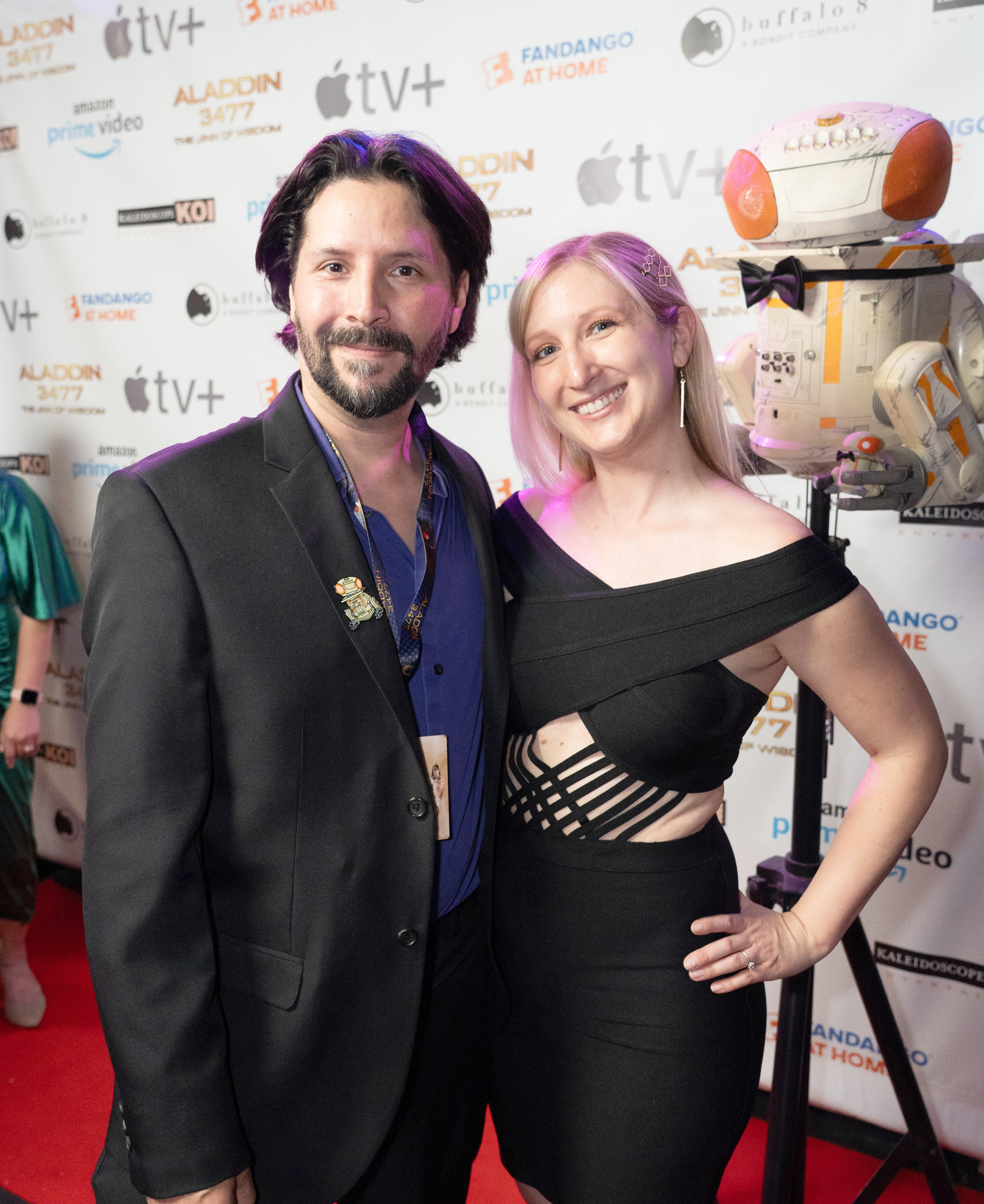
Actor Erik Steele (Aladdin) with his wife Terri (and Fidgi) on the red carpet for Aladdin 3477: The Jinn of Wisdom.

The first movie trailer for Aladdin 3477: The Jinn of Wisdom received 2.1 million views on YouTube.

== Releases ==
=== The Jinn of Wisdom ===
The first Aladdin 3477 film, The Jinn of Wisdom, is represented by Circus Road Films and is distributed by Buffalo 8, a Bondit company. The film debuted on Amazon Prime Video, Apple TV+, Fandango at Home, Cable VOD and Digital HD on January 3, 2025. The film was available to stream through libraries via Hoopla on January 24, 2025. The Jinn of wisdom was later released through AVOD streaming platforms like Tubi, Kinocheck, VA Media, Movie Central, and Vyre Network on March 7, 2025. The physical media release for the film on Blu-ray and DVD was available on July 15, 2025.

=== Future films ===
Because all three Aladdin 3477 movies were filmed at the same time, two more movies in the trilogy have already completed physical production, although titles and release dates for the subsequent films have not yet been revealed.

== Reception ==
The Jinn of Wisdom received mixed reviews, with some critics praising its extensive world building and heart, whilst others criticise its storytelling and poor performances caused by budget restraints.

== Awards ==
At the 2018 Hong Kong Business Awards hosted by Apac Magazine, Aladdin 3477 was awarded "Most Anticipated Film Project" while the trilogy of films were still in production.

In November 2025, the first Aladdin 3477 film was nominated for 3 awards for the 7th annual Film Threat Award This! Awards Ceremony in the categories of "Best Independent Science Fiction Film", "Best Director", and "Independent Movie of the Year. On January 31st, 2026, Matt Busch, the FIDGI mechanical puppet, and a handful of the cast we in attendance at the ceremony at the Frida Cinema in Santa Ana, California to bring home their win for "Best Independent Science Fiction Film."

== Merchandising ==
=== Books ===
Kaleidoscope Koi Entertainment, LLC has published the following titles:

- Aladdin 3477: Official Collector's Edition by Matt Busch (2023) (ISBN 978-0-9717890-6-7)
- The Art of Aladdin 3477: The Jinn of Wisdom by Matt Busch (2025) (ISBN 978-0-9717890-7-4)

=== Toys ===
Through the support of a successful crowd funding campaign in 2023, Matt Busch designed numerous toys based on the first Aladdin 3477 film. Included through the reward tiers were 10 LEGO-style block figures of the main characters, as well as a set of 6 FIDGI Designer Toys. The FIDGI variant mystery figures were packaged and distributed in blind-boxes for fans to attempt collecting them all.
