= Ala ol Din-e Sofla =

Ala ol Din-e Sofla علاالدين سفلي
- Village
- Location within Iran
- Coordinates: 28°30′44″N 57°45′02″E
- Country: Iran
- Province: Kerman
- County: Jiroft
- Bakhsh: Central
- Rural District: Eslamabad

Population (2006)
  - Total: 511
- Time zone: UTC+3:30 (IRST)
  - Summer (DST): UTC+4:30 (IRDT)

Ala ol Din-e Sofla (Persian: علاالدين سفلي, also Romanized as ʿAlā ol Dīn-e Soflá; also known as ʿAlāeddīn-e Soflá) is a village in Eslamabad Rural District, in the Central District of Jiroft County, Kerman Province, Iran. At the 2006 census, its population was 511, in 95 families.
