= Alaeddin Keykubad =

Alaeddin Keykubad may refer to:

- Kayqubad I, a.k.a. Alaeddin Keykubad I (d. 1237)
- Kayqubad II, a.k.a. Alaeddin Keykubad II (d. 1256)
- Kayqubad III, a.k.a. Alaeddin Keykubad III (d. 1302)
