= Aladdinn =

- Breed: Arabian
- Sire: Nureddin
- Grandsire: Witraz
- Dam: Lalage
- Maternal grandsire: Gerwazy
- Sex: Stallion
- Foaled: 1975
- Country: Foaled Sweden, imported to United States
- Color: Bay
- Owner: Lasma Arabians, Taylor Arabians

Other awards
- Swedish National Champion Stallion, US National Champion Stallion

Aladdinn (1975–2010) was the second all-time leading sire of Arabian horses. Foaled in Sweden in 1975, by Nureddin and out of Lalage, he was a solid bay with no white markings. Aladdinn was imported to the United States in 1978 by Lasma Arabians and syndicated for the sum of $1,800,000. Aladdinn was the Swedish National Champion the year he was imported, and the next year, in 1979, he won the United States National Championship. Aladdinn sired 1,211 foals in his lifetime. Of these, 391 became champions. Aladdinn died in 2010 at the age of 35.

In Sweden, his breeder was Erik Erlandsson of Tomelila, Sweden. The horse was registered in Sweden as "Aladdin" but upon importation to the US, an extra n was added to his name due to another horse being registered with the same name.

== Pedigree ==
Pedigree of Aladdinn
| Sire Nureddin | Witraz | Ofir | Kuhailan-Haifi |
| Sire Nureddin | Witraz | Ofir | Dwiza |
| Sire Nureddin | Witraz | Makata | Fetysz |
| Sire Nureddin | Witraz | Makata | Gazella II |
| Sire Nureddin | Norma | Hardy | Ganges I |
| Sire Nureddin | Norma | Hardy | Gazella II |
| Sire Nureddin | Norma | Ferja | Bakszysz |
| Sire Nureddin | Norma | Ferja | Zulejma |
| Dam Lalage | Gerwazy | Doktryner | Miecznik |
| Dam Lalage | Gerwazy | Doktryner | Blaga |
| Dam Lalage | Gerwazy | Gwara | Wielki Szlem |
| Dam Lalage | Gerwazy | Gwara | Canaria |
| Dam Lalage | Lafirynda | Miecznik | Fetysz |
| Dam Lalage | Lafirynda | Miecznik | Koalicja |
| Dam Lalage | Lafirynda | Lala | Amurath Sahib |
| Dam Lalage | Lafirynda | Lala | Elsissa |
