= Allaedin Ghoraifi =

Iraqi Twelver Shi'a Marja' (born 1365)

Sayyid Alaaeldeen Al Ghurayfi
- Born: 1945 (age 80–81); Baghdad, Kingdom of Iraq

Philosophical work
- Era: Modern
- Region: Middle East
- School: Usuli
- Main interests: Religious jurisprudence

Grand Ayatollah Sayyid Alaaeldeen bin Musa bin Mohammed Ali Almusawi Alghurayfi (Arabic: آية الله العظمى السيد علاء الدين بن موسى بن محمد علي الموسوي الغريفي; born 1945) is an Iraqi Twelver Shi'a Marja'.

He has studied in seminaries of Najaf, Iraq under Grand Ayatollah Abul-Qassim Khoei and Mohammad Shahroudi.

== See also ==
- List of maraji
