= Aladin, Azerbaijan =

Aladin
- Location within Azerbaijan
- Coordinates: 39°09′10″N 46°37′36.7″E
- Country: Azerbaijan
- District: Zangilan
- Time zone: UTC+4 (AZT)
  - Summer (DST): UTC+5 (AZT)

Aladin is a village in the Zangilan District of Azerbaijan.

== History ==
The village was located in the Armenian-occupied territories surrounding Nagorno-Karabakh, coming under the control of ethnic Armenian forces in 1993 during the First Nagorno-Karabakh War.

The village subsequently became part of the self-proclaimed Republic of Artsakh as part of its Kashatagh Province, referred to as Vanatun (Armenian: Վանատուն).

It was recaptured by Azerbaijan on 30 October 2020, during the Aras Valley campaign in the 2020 Nagorno-Karabakh war.
