= Aladin Foods =

Bulgarian fast food chain

- Company type: Private
- Industry: Fast food restaurant
- Founded: 1998 (28 years ago)
- Founders: Mahmoud Fares
- Headquarters: Sofia, Bulgaria
- Number of locations: 31 (2024)
- Area served: Bulgaria
- Key people: Khaled Al Kharfan (CEO)
- Products: Doners, burgers, pizza, fried chicken, asian food, and sushi
- Revenue: ▲BGN 37.1 million (2021)
- Number of employees: 556 (2021)
- Website: www.aladinfoods.bg

Aladin Foods, commonly known simply as Aladin, is a Bulgarian chain of fast food restaurants. It is the biggest doner chain in the country. Since its founding, it has expanded its menu to offer additional products, including burgers, pizza, fried chicken, Asian food, and sushi. The chain opened its first franchised location in 2016, though most restaurants remain corporate-owned.

== See also ==
- Fast food
- Doner kebab
