= Ala ol Din-e Olya =

Ala ol Din-e Olya علاالدين عليا
- Village
- Location within Iran
- Coordinates: 28°31′38″N 57°45′05″E
- Country: Iran
- Province: Kerman
- County: Jiroft
- Bakhsh: Central
- Rural District: Eslamabad

Population (2006)
  - Total: 786
- Time zone: UTC+3:30 (IRST)
  - Summer (DST): UTC+4:30 (IRDT)

Ala ol Din-e Olya (Persian: علاالدين عليا, also Romanized as ʿAlā ol Dīn-e ‘Olyā; also known as ʿAlā ol Dīnī-ye ‘Olyā (Persian: علاالديني عليا) and ʿAlāeddīn-e ‘Olyā) is a village in Eslamabad Rural District, in the Central District of Jiroft County, Kerman Province, Iran. At the 2006 census, its population was 786, in 168 families.
