= The Swiss Family Robinson (disambiguation) =

The Swiss Family Robinson is an 1812 novel by Johann David Wyss.

The Swiss Family Robinson or Swiss Family Robinson may also refer to:

- The New Swiss Family Robinson, an 1882 juvenile novel by Owen Wister

== Film adaptations ==
- Swiss Family Robinson (1940 film), American film directed by Edward Ludwig
- Swiss Family Robinson (1960 film), American film produced by Walt Disney Productions and directed by Ken Annakin
- The New Swiss Family Robinson, 1998 American film directed by Stewart Raffill

== Television series ==
- Swiss Family Robinson (1974 TV series), Canadian drama series starring Chris Wiggins and Diana Leblanc
- The Adventures of Swiss Family Robinson, a 1998 series starring Richard Thomas
- The Swiss Family Robinson (1975 TV series), American adventure series starring Martin Milner and Pat Delaney
- The Swiss Family Robinson: Flone of the Mysterious Island, Japanese animated series

== See also ==
- Space Family Robinson, a science-fiction comic book series published by Gold Key Comics
- Swiss Cheese Family Robinson, a 1947 Mighty Mouse cartoon
- Swiss Family Treehouse, a walk-through attraction featured at Magic Kingdom in Disney parks
