= Dyan Cannon =

American actress and filmmaker (born 1937)

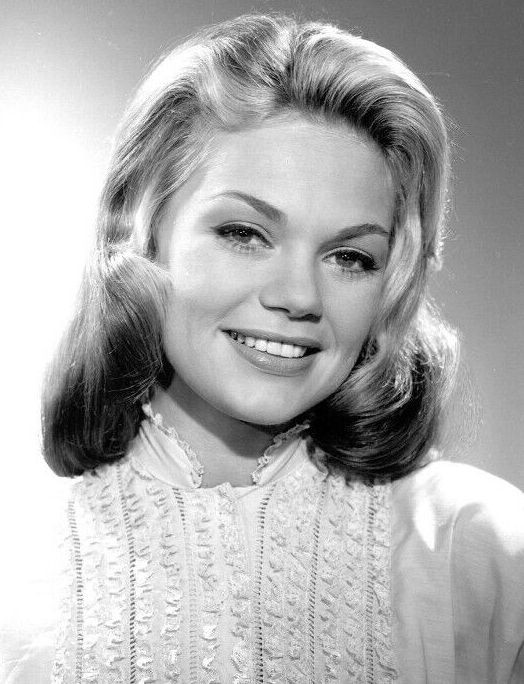
- Cannon, c. 1960
- Born: Samille Diane Friesen; January 4, 1937 (age 89); Tacoma, Washington, U.S.
- Occupations: Actress; director; screenwriter; producer; editor
- Years active: 1957–present
- Spouses: Cary Grant (m. 1965; div. 1968); Stanley Fimberg (m. 1985; div. 1991)
- Children: Jennifer Grant
- Relatives: David Friesen (brother)

Dyan Cannon (born Samille Diane Friesen; January 4, 1937) is an American actress, filmmaker, and editor. Her accolades include a Saturn Award, a Golden Globe Award, three Academy Award nominations, and a star on the Hollywood Walk of Fame. She was named Female Star of the Year by the National Association of Theatre Owners in 1973 and the Hollywood Women's Press Club in 1979.

A former beauty queen who held the title of Miss West Seattle, Cannon made her television debut in 1958. Over the next decade, she became a common sight on episodic shows while appearing occasionally on Broadway and in B movies. In 1969, she had her breakthrough film role in the sex comedy Bob & Carol & Ted & Alice, for which she was nominated for an Academy Award for Best Supporting Actress. Cannon was nominated in that category again for Heaven Can Wait (1978), for which she won the Golden Globe Award for Best Supporting Actress – Motion Picture. She was nominated for a Golden Globe Award for Best Actress – Motion Picture Drama for her lead role in Such Good Friends (1971). She also was nominated for an Academy Award for Best Live Action Short Film as the producer of Number One (1976).

Other films in which Cannon has performed include The Love Machine (1971), Shamus (1973), The Last of Sheila (1973), Child Under a Leaf (1974), Revenge of the Pink Panther (1978), Honeysuckle Rose (1980), Coast to Coast (1980), Deathtrap (1982), Author! Author! (1982), Caddyshack II (1988), 8 Heads in a Duffel Bag (1997), Out to Sea (1997), and Boynton Beach Club (2005). Cannon made her feature directorial debut with 1990's semiautobiographical drama The End of Innocence, which she also wrote and starred in. From 1997 to 2000, she played the recurring role of Judge Jennifer "Whipper" Cone on the legal series Ally McBeal.

Before her career took off, Cannon was married to Cary Grant for three years and gave birth to his only child, daughter Jennifer. Reluctant to discuss the marriage since their 1968 divorce, Cannon initially turned down publishing deals following Grant's death in 1986. Her memoir Dear Cary was published in 2011 and became a New York Times Best Seller. In 2023, the book was adapted into a miniseries called Archie with Cannon executive producing.

== Early life ==
Cannon was born Samille Diane Friesen in Tacoma, Washington, on January 4, 1937, the daughter of housewife Claire (née Portnoy) and life insurance salesman Ben Friesen. (Note: During a 2025 visit to the White House, Cannon was stopped by Secret Service agents over a discrepancy on her passport, which lists her birth year as 1939. Cannon admitted to falsifying the date when she originally filled out the paperwork—a common practice in pre-internet times, as there was no way to fact-check. Even her mother's reported date of birth varies on official documents.) She was raised in the Jewish faith of her mother, who was an immigrant from Ukraine; her father was a Mennonite of Dutch-Canadian ancestry. Her younger brother is jazz musician David Friesen. When Cannon was 10, the family moved eastward to Spokane, Washington; they returned to the Pacific coast four years later, settling in Seattle. Cannon attended West Seattle High School and was crowned Miss West Seattle in 1954. She spent two and a half semesters at the University of Washington, majoring in anthropology.

In 1956, Cannon dropped out of college and went to live with her aunt Sally in Phoenix, Arizona, where she took a job at Merrill Lynch & Co. Courted by nightclub owner Sonny Orling, then 32, she got engaged and followed him to Beverly Hills, California. They soon parted, but she decided to stay in the area and enroll at UCLA, studying anthropology and writing. A part-time modeling job led to an interview with producer Jerry Wald, who suggested she change her professional last name to Cannon. (Note: She adopted the spelling "Dyan" later on, when she read a notice about herself which was written that way in Rome's Celebrity News and liked it.) She signed to MGM, doing promotional work for the film Les Girls (1957), and studied with acting teacher Sanford Meisner.

== Career ==
=== Beginnings ===
Cannon made her film debut in 1960 in The Rise and Fall of Legs Diamond; she had appeared on television since the late 1950s, including a guest appearance on Bat Masterson as Mary Lowery in the 1959 episode "Lady Luck" and again in a 1961 episode as Diane Jansen in "The Price of Paradise". She appeared in 1959 on CBS's Wanted: Dead or Alive, in episode 52, "Vanishing Act", as Nicole McCready. About this time, she was on the CBS Western Johnny Ringo, starring Don Durant, and on Jack Lord's Western Stoney Burke on ABC. She also appeared on Hawaiian Eye in 1961, opposite Tracey Steele, Robert Conrad, and Connie Stevens.

In 1962, Cannon acted on Broadway with Jane Fonda and Bradford Dillman in The Fun Couple. Next came the national touring company of the musical How to Succeed in Business Without Really Trying, in which she played Rosemary. She declined an opportunity to reprise her role in the 1967 film version, which went to Michele Lee.

In 1964 she guest-starred on Gunsmoke, playing Ivy Norton, an abused daughter looking to marry the man she loves in the episode "Aunt Thede". She portrayed Mona Elliott in the episode "The Man Behind the Man" of the 1964 CBS drama series The Reporter and had a regular role on the short-lived daytime soap opera Full Circle. Cannon also made guest appearances on 77 Sunset Strip, The Untouchables, Tombstone Territory, the 1960 episode "Sheriff of the Town" of the first-run syndicated Western series Two Faces West with Walter Coy as Cauter, and the 1962 Ripcord episode "The Helicopter Race" as Ripcord Inc.'s secretary and receptionist Marion Hines. She landed another role in a feature with The Murder Game (1965), then took four years off.

=== Stardom ===
Cannon's first major film role came in 1969's Bob & Carol & Ted & Alice, a sexual revolution social satire which earned her Academy Award and Golden Globe nominations. With only a weekend to decide, she had taken a gamble in choosing to play the titular Alice instead of appearing in The Love God? (1969) and thereby securing a long-term studio contract. Bob & Carol & Ted & Alice emerged as the sixth highest grossing film of 1969.

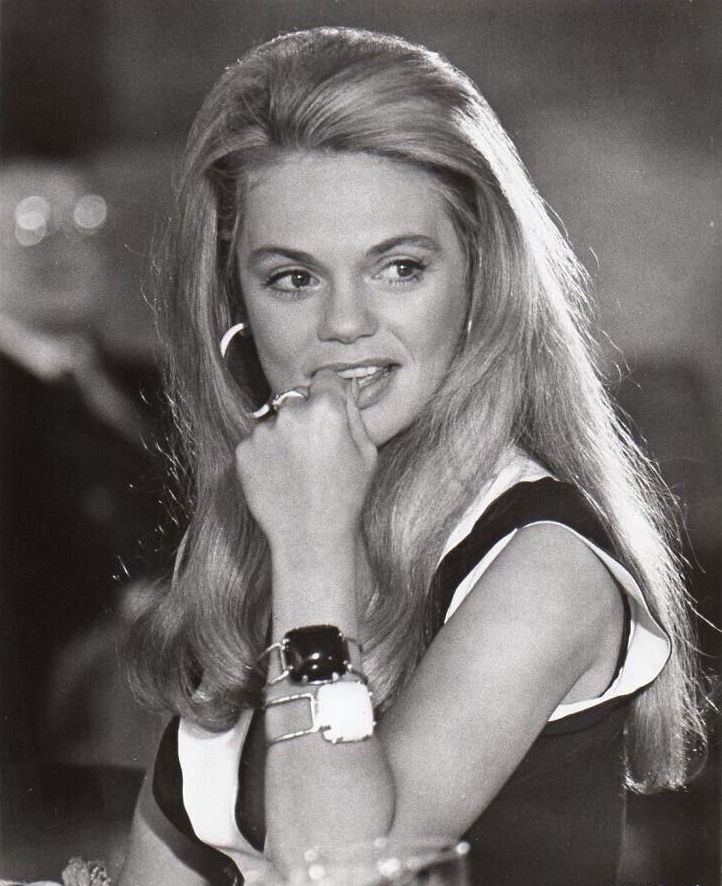
Cannon in 1971

Cannon starred in four high-profile features in 1971: The Love Machine, from the novel by Jacqueline Susann; The Anderson Tapes with Sean Connery and Christopher Walken; The Burglars with Jean-Paul Belmondo and Omar Sharif; and Otto Preminger's Such Good Friends, for which she received a Golden Globe nomination for Best Actress. Her name was used to market a fifth release that year, Doctors' Wives, in which she had top billing despite only making a cameo appearance.

While shooting Such Good Friends, Cannon and director Preminger clashed over her refusal to appear nude during a sex scene with Ken Howard; to spice things up, he added a close-up of a Polaroid photo with her head superimposed on a nude body. She considered suing when the insert began circulating in skin magazines, but decided to back off. The Chicago Tribune's Gene Siskel gave the movie 3½ out of 4 stars and called Cannon "precisely the kind of woman her favorite fishnet blouse was created for."

She was slated to appear in The Traveling Executioner (1970) and Double Indemnity (1973), but bowed out and was replaced by Marianna Hill and Samantha Eggar, respectively.

In 1973, Cannon starred opposite Burt Reynolds in Shamus and played an agent based on Sue Mengers in The Last of Sheila, and was named Actress of the Year by the National Association of Theatre Owners. In 1974, she gave a critically acclaimed performance in Child Under a Leaf and starred in the made-for-TV movie Virginia Hill with Harvey Keitel. Following this, she took a four-year absence from acting in feature films. Among the offers she turned down was Jacqueline Bisset's role in St. Ives (1976).

Cannon, who is also a singer/songwriter, starred in her own musical stage act at Caesars Palace in Las Vegas and Harrah's Lake Tahoe during the mid-1970s. She then enrolled in the American Film Institute's Directing Workshop for Women. She became the first Oscar-nominated actress to be nominated in the Best Short Film, Live Action category for Number One (1976), a project which Cannon produced, directed, wrote, edited and appeared in. It was a story about childhood sexual curiosity.

In 1978, Cannon co-starred in Revenge of the Pink Panther alongside Peter Sellers. Also in 1978, she appeared in Heaven Can Wait, for which she received another Oscar nomination and won a Golden Globe Award for Best Supporting Actress. Both Revenge of the Pink Panther and Heaven Can Wait ranked among the year's top ten films at the box office.

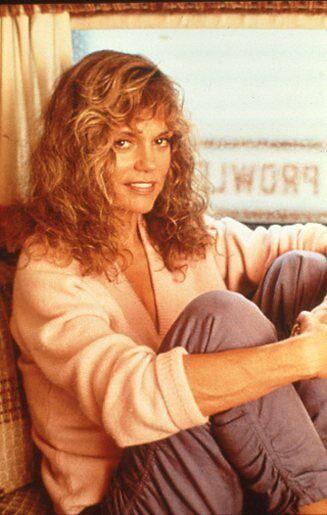
Cannon in 1988

Cannon hosted Saturday Night Live during its first season and guest-starred in the fourth season of The Muppet Show. She co-starred with then-boyfriend Armand Assante in the TV movie Lady of the House (1978), a dramatization of the life of Sally Stanford. Los Angeles Times critic Kevin Thomas called it "the biggest and best role she's ever had." In 1979, the Hollywood Women's Press Club voted Cannon as Female Star of the Year.

Cannon appeared in Honeysuckle Rose (1980) with Willie Nelson, Coast to Coast (1980) with Robert Blake, Author! Author! (1982) with Al Pacino, and Sidney Lumet's Deathtrap (1982) with Michael Caine and Christopher Reeve. For Coast to Coast, she also served as an uncredited writer and learned how to drive a 13-gear 30-ton semi-trailer diesel truck. Newsday's Joseph Gelmis called it "one of the year's few films that can be enjoyed by the entire family" and syndicated critic Joe Baltake applauded the "amazingly credible, three-dimensional performances" from Cannon and co-star Blake.

She next starred in the TV movie Having It All (1982) as well as a miniseries, Master of the Game (1984), then had the title role in Jenny's War (1985). After making Rock 'n' Roll Mom (1988) for Disney, she appeared with an ensemble cast in Caddyshack II (1988). In addition, she co-wrote the title track for Chaka Khan's album The Woman I Am with Brenda Russell, and was a guest vocalist on Donna Summer's version of "State of Independence".

For her contributions to the film industry, Cannon was inducted into the Hollywood Walk of Fame in 1983 with a motion picture star located at 6608 Hollywood Boulevard.

=== Later work ===
Cannon wrote, directed, and starred in the semiautobiographical film The End of Innocence (1990). She sold her Malibu house to finance its completion when the production ran out of money. It garnered positive reviews, but advertising was limited in the wake of the Gulf War and the film was not picked up for wide distribution. She subsequently appeared opposite Phylicia Rashad in Jailbirds (1991) and Kris Kristofferson and Tony Curtis in Christmas in Connecticut (1992), the latter of which was directed by Arnold Schwarzenegger, before reuniting with Bob & Carol & Ted & Alice director Paul Mazursky for The Pickle (1993), alongside Danny Aiello.

Cannon had guest roles on the popular television shows Diagnosis: Murder and The Practice, and was a semiregular on Ally McBeal. In 1997, she could be seen in three major studio film releases: 8 Heads in a Duffel Bag with Joe Pesci; a remake of That Darn Cat; and Out to Sea with Walter Matthau and Jack Lemmon. Also that year, she worked with Sarah Michelle Gellar in the TV movie Beverly Hills Family Robinson. In 2001 and 2002, she had a regular part in the TV series Three Sisters. Cannon and Christopher Walken were reunited for Kangaroo Jack (2003), but her performance was cut down to a walk on in the final version of the film.

In 2005, she appeared in Boynton Beach Club, a movie about aging Floridians who have just lost their spouses; Cannon's real-life ex Michael Nouri played her love interest. Her later projects included A Kiss at Midnight (2008) for Hallmark and the unsold pilot Women Without Men (2010) with Lorraine Bracco and Penny Marshall. She wrote and directed another short, Unleashed (2010).

Cannon returned to the stage to star in a 2013 production of Ken Ludwig's The Fox on the Fairway in Overland Park, Kansas. After a hiatus from the screen, she acted in the equestrian-themed family film Hope's Legacy (2021). Forgoing its scheduled opening at Baltimore's Senator Theatre due to the COVID-19 pandemic, the film was instead released to streaming platforms.

Cannon published a bestselling memoir, Dear Cary: My Life with Cary Grant, in 2011. She had previously been approached by Swifty Lazar to write about her late ex-husband in 1986, turning down "millions", and declined another publishing offer some years later from Jacqueline Kennedy Onassis, stating that healing was still needed. Cannon served as executive producer of a four-part miniseries based on her book, entitled Archie, which premiered on BritBox in 2023 and stars Jason Isaacs in the title role.

In 2025, she began co-hosting the podcast God’s Table alongside Tracey E. Bregman, Kym Douglas, and Christine Avanti-Fischer.

== Personal life ==
In 1961, Cannon began dating actor Cary Grant, who was 33 years her senior. They married on July 22, 1965, and had one daughter, Jennifer (b. February 26, 1966). Cannon filed for divorce in September 1967, and it was finalized on March 21, 1968.

Cannon married a second time on April 18, 1985, to lawyer-turned-real estate investor Stanley Fimberg. They divorced in 1991. In 2024, Cannon said Fimberg and she are still friendly.

Cannon has also been in relationships with comedian Mort Sahl, talent agent Ron Weisner, and sculptor Carl Hartman, as well as producers Murray Shostak and Leonard Rabinowitz, directors Jerry Schatzberg and Hal Ashby, and actors Armand Assante, Hy Chase, Ron Ely and Michael Nouri. She remains friendly with Nouri and accompanied him to a premiere four decades after their breakup. In 2025, Cannon told a reporter for People magazine that she has several friends with benefits. She later clarified that she had misunderstood the term.

Shostak and Rabinowitz produced her starring vehicles Child Under a Leaf and The End of Innocence, respectively; Schatzberg directed her in Honeysuckle Rose; Assante and Nouri were her leading men in Lady of the House and Boynton Beach Club, respectively; and she guest-starred on Ely's series Malibu Run.

In 1972, Cannon revealed that she engaged in primal therapy. She also dabbled in metaphysics and got kicked out of Esalen. Cannon smoked three packs of cigarettes a day until 1971; she decided to stop after reading the habit would dull her libido. She was a vegetarian for a long time, but quit that too.

A longtime fixture at Los Angeles Lakers games, she is considered the team's second-most famous fan behind Jack Nicholson.

For 12 years, Cannon hosted God's Party, a biweekly Bible study held at Radford Studio Center. She formerly identified as a born-again Christian, but has since expressed she is spiritual but not religious.

== Philanthropy ==
Cannon's experience as a single mother led to her becoming national spokeswoman for Big Brothers Big Sisters of America, which provides emotional support and companionship for children of one-parent homes. She paid for the tombstone of slain runaway Alyssa Margie 'Raven' Gomez, whom she'd met while making a documentary about homelessness. Cannon has used her celebrity to benefit other charitable organizations, such as Special Olympics, for mentally and physically disabled athletes. She has volunteered at the Dream Center since its inception in 1994, providing assistance to recovering addicts and victims of human trafficking.

== Portrayals ==
The 2023 miniseries Archie includes the story of her courtship and marriage to Cary Grant. She was portrayed by Laura Aikman. In the sports drama Winning Time: The Rise of the Lakers Dynasty, Cannon is played by Caitlin O'Connor.

== Filmography ==
Year	Title	Role(s)	Notes
1958	Have Gun – Will Travel	Fifi	Episodes: "Twenty-Four Hours at North Fork" and "The Man Who Wouldn't Talk"
1958	Target		Episode: "On Cue"
1958	77 Sunset Strip	Sheila	Episode: "The Bouncing Chip"
1959	Highway Patrol	Jean Deesing	Episode: "Revenge"
1959	Playhouse 90	Gloria / Marcie	Episodes: "The Velvet Alley", "The Ding-A-Ling Girl" and "A Trip to Paradise"
1959	Lock-Up	Eileen Winfield	Episode: "Change of Heart"
1959	Bat Masterson	Mary Lowery	Episode: "Lady Luck"
1959	Zane Grey Theatre	Annie	Episode: "Shadows"
1959	Hotel de Paree	Peggy Joyce	Episode: "The Only Wheel in Town"
1959	Wanted Dead or Alive	Nicole McCready	Episode: "Vanishing Act"
1960	The Rise and Fall of Legs Diamond	Dixie	
1960	This Rebel Breed	Wiggles	
1960	The Detectives	Olga May	Episode: "The Chameleon Truck"
1960	Johnny Ringo	Rhoda	Episode: "Soft Cargo"
1960	Tombstone Territory	Tracy Travers	Episode: "The Injury"
1960	Two Faces West		Episode: "Sheriff of the Town"
1960–1961	Full Circle	Lisa Crowder	Series regular
1961	Bat Masterson	Diane Jansen	Episode: "The Price of Paradise"
1961	Hawaiian Eye	Julie Brent	Episode: "The Big Dealer"
1961	Malibu Run	Thelma / Diana Hogarth	Episodes: "The Radioactive Object Adventure" and "The Diana Adventure"
1961	Follow the Sun	Lana Flanagan	Episode: "The Woman Who Never Was"
1961	Ben Casey	Donna Whitney	Episode: "A Certain Time, a Certain Darkness"
1962	The Untouchables	Mavis Carroll	Episode: "Silent Partner"
1962	77 Sunset Strip	Kathy	Episode: "The Bridal Trail Caper"
1962	The Red Skelton Show	Clara II	Episode: "Somebody Up There Should Stay There"
1962	Ripcord	Marion Hines	Episode: "The Helicopter Race"
1963	Stoney Burke	Flatbush	Episode: "Death Rides a Pale Horse"
1964	Mr. Broadway	Marianne	Episode: "Between the Rats and the Finks"
1964	The Reporter	Mona Elliott	Episode: "The Man Behind the Badge"
1964	Gunsmoke	Ivy Norton	Episode: "Aunt Thede"
1965	Burke's Law	Francesca Szabo	Episode: "The Weapon"
1965	The Murder Game		
1969	Bob & Carol & Ted & Alice	Alice Henderson	National Society of Film Critics Award for Best Supporting Actress (3rd place); New York Film Critics Circle Award for Best Supporting Actress; Nominated—Academy Award for Best Supporting Actress; Nominated—Golden Globe Award for Best Actress – Motion Picture Musical or Comedy; Nominated—Golden Globe Award for Most Promising Newcomer – Female
1969	Medical Center	Elinor Crawford	Episode: "Victim"
1971	Doctors' Wives	Lorrie Dellman	
1971	The Anderson Tapes	Ingrid	
1971	The Love Machine	Judith Austin	
1971	The Burglars	Lena	
1971	Such Good Friends	Julie Messinger	Nominated—Golden Globe Award for Best Actress in a Motion Picture – Drama
1972	Rowan & Martin's Laugh-In	Various - Guest performer	Episode: "Dyan Cannon"
1973	Shamus	Alexis Montaigne	
1973	The Last of Sheila	Christine	Cannon's character is believed to have been based on Sue Mengers.
1974	Child Under a Leaf	Domino	
1974	Virginia Hill	Virginia Hill	
1976	Number One	Matt's mother	Also writer, director, producer, editor Nominated—Academy Award for Best Live Action Short Film
1976	Saturday Night Live	Various - Guest host	Episode: "Dyan Cannon/Leon & Mary Russell"
1978	Heaven Can Wait	Julia Farnsworth	Golden Globe Award for Best Supporting Actress – Motion Picture; Saturn Award for Best Supporting Actress; Nominated—Academy Award for Best Supporting Actress
1978	Revenge of the Pink Panther	Simone Legree	
1978	Lady of the House	Sally Stanford	
1980	The Muppet Show	Herself	Episode: "Dyan Cannon"
1980	Honeysuckle Rose	Viv Bonham	Cannon also sings three songs on the soundtrack: "Two Sides to Every Story", "Loving You Is Easier", and "Uncloudy Day".
1980	Coast to Coast	Madie Levrington	
1982	Deathtrap	Myra Bruhl	Nominated—Golden Raspberry Award for Worst Supporting Actress
1982	Author! Author!	Alice Detroit	
1982	Having It All	Thera Baylin	
1983	Arthur the King	Katherine	
1984	Master of the Game	Kate McGregor-Blackwell	
1985	Jenny's War	Jenny Baines	
1988	She's Having a Baby	Herself	
1988	Rock 'n' Roll Mom	Annie Hackett	
1988	Caddyshack II	Elizabeth Pearce	
1990	The End of Innocence	Stephanie	Also director and writer
1991	Jailbirds	Rosie LaCroix	
1992	Christmas in Connecticut	Elizabeth Blane	
1993	Beverly Hills, 90210	Herself	Episode: "Senior Poll"
1993	The Pickle	Ellen Stone	
1993	Based on an Untrue Story	Varda Gray	
1994	Diagnosis: Murder	Bonnie Valin	Episodes: "The Last Laugh: Part 1" and "The Last Laugh: Part 2"
1995	A Perry Mason Mystery: The Case of the Jealous Jokester	Josie Joplin	
1995	The Naked Truth	Mitzi Wilde	Episode: "Girl Buys Soup While Woman Weds Ape!"
1996	The Rockford Files: If the Frame Fits...	Jess Wilding	
1997	Beverly Hills Family Robinson	Marsha Robinson	
1997	That Darn Cat	Mrs. Flint	
1997	8 Heads in a Duffel Bag	Annette Bennett	
1997	Out to Sea	Liz LaBreche	
1997	Allie & Me	Karen Schneider	
1997–2000	Ally McBeal	The Honorable Judge Jennifer 'Whipper' Cone	Recurring role; 17 episodes Nominated—Viewers for Quality Television Award for Best Recurring Player
1998	The Practice	The Honorable Judge Jennifer 'Whipper' Cone	Episode: "Line of Duty"
1998	Black Jaq	Abby 'Bubblin' Browne	
1998	Diamond Girl	Abby Montana	
1998	The Sender	Gina Fairfax	
1999	Kiss of a Stranger	Leslie	
1999	Arliss	Herself	Episode: "People Are Assets Too"
2000	My Mother the Spy	Gloria Shaeffer	
2001–2002	Three Sisters	Honey Bernstein-Flynn	Series regular
2003	Kangaroo Jack	Anna Carbone	
2004	After the Sunset	Herself	
2005	Boynton Beach Club	Lois	
2008	A Kiss at Midnight	Kay Flowers	
2010	Women Without Men	Dominique	Unsold pilot
2019	Five Old Comedy Writers Talking Sh*t		Short subject
2019	Mood Swings	Aunt Sam	Episode: "Farrah's Day Off"
2021	Hope's Legacy	Linda	

== Stage ==
Year	Title	Role	Venue(s)
1962	The Fun Couple	Kathy	Lyceum Theatre
1962	The Most Happy Fella	Cleo	Los Angeles Civic Light Opera
1963–1964	How to Succeed in Business Without Really Trying	Rosemary Pillkington	See full list here
1967	The Ninety Day Mistress	Leona Hastings	Biltmore Theatre
1975	Private Lives	Amanda Prynne	Packard Music Hall, Warren, Ohio
1976	Two for the Seesaw	Gittel Mosca	Arlington Park Theatre, Arlington Heights, Illinois
2013	The Fox on the Fairway	Pamela	New Theatre, Overland Park, Kansas

== Discography ==
=== Albums ===
Title	Details	Peak chart positions	
Title	Details	US	CAN
Honeysuckle Rose	Released: July 18, 1980; Label: Columbia Records	11	24

=== Singles ===
Year	Title	Artist	Album	Functioned as
1982	"State of Independence"	Donna Summer	Donna Summer	Guest vocalist

=== Other songs ===
Year	Title	Artist	Album	Functioned as
1992	"The Woman I Am"	Chaka Khan	The Woman I Am	Writer
