= Adventureland Treehouse =

Walk-through treehouse attraction in Disneyland Park

Adventureland Treehouse—Inspired by Walt Disney's Swiss Family Robinson
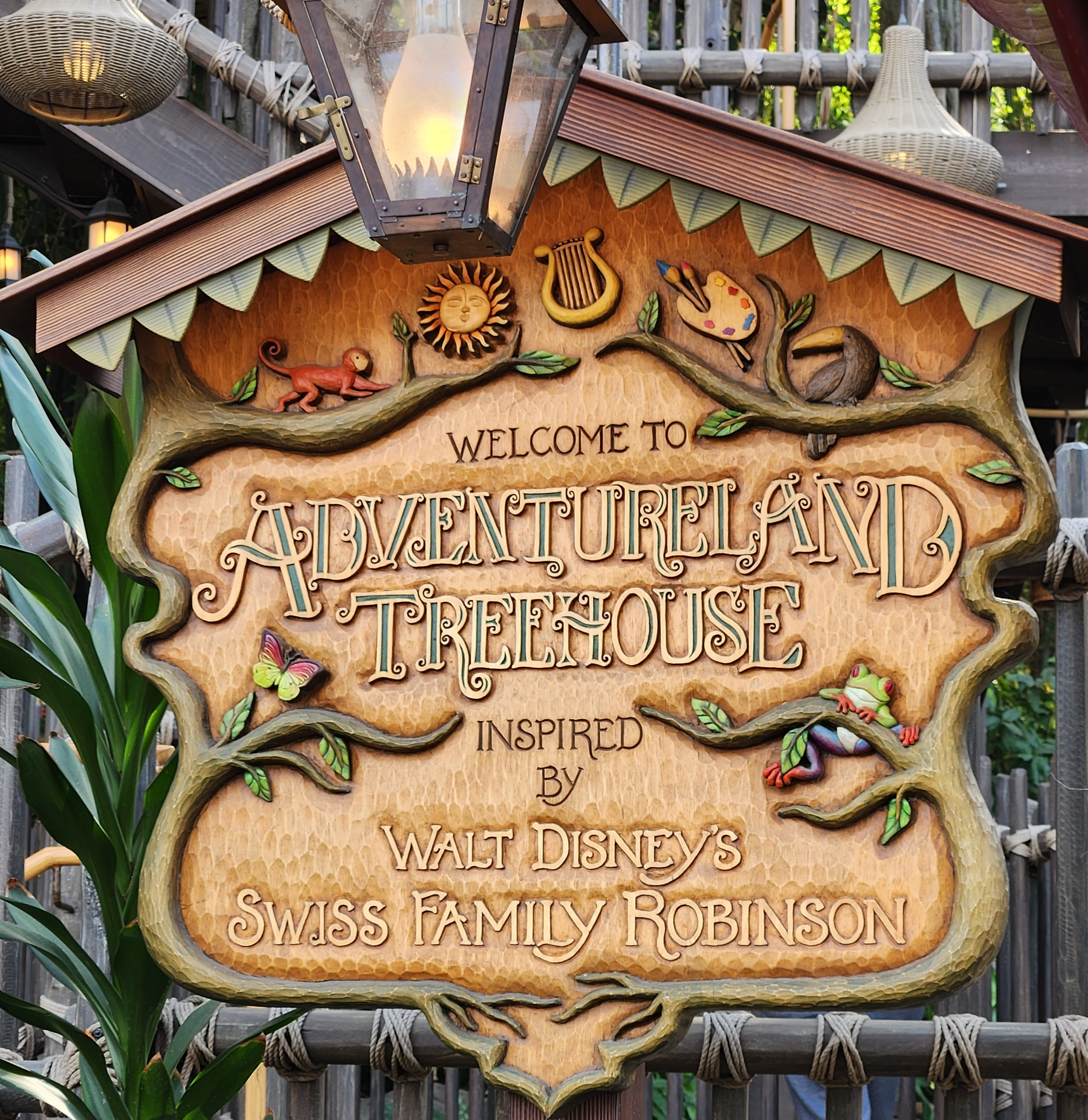

Disneyland
- Area: Adventureland
- Status: Operating
- Opening date: November 10, 2023
- Replaced: Tarzan's Treehouse

Ride statistics
- Attraction type: Walk-through treehouse
- Designer: Walt Disney Imagineering
- Theme: Swiss Family Robinson
- Music: "Swisskapolka"
- Height: 80 ft (24 m)
- Wheelchair accessible

Adventureland Treehouse—Inspired by Walt Disney's Swiss Family Robinson is a walk-through attraction located in the Adventureland section of Disneyland Park. Originally opened as the Swiss Family Treehouse in 1962, this is the third incarnation of the Disneyland treehouse.

== History ==
The Adventureland Treehouse originally opened at Disneyland as the Swiss Family Treehouse on November 18, 1962, based upon Walt Disney's 1960 film, Swiss Family Robinson. The treehouse remained themed to Swiss Family Robinson until March 8, 1999, when it closed to begin the transformation into an attraction based on Disney Animation's 1999 film Tarzan. Tarzan's Treehouse opened on June 23, 1999.

Tarzan's Treehouse closed in September 2021. In April 2022, Disneyland announced that the treehouse would be getting a new theme, as the demolition of the bridge entrance to Tarzan's Treehouse began.

Walt Disney Imagineering (WDI) opted to go back to the original Swiss Family Robinson theme, with a twist. The transformation was headed up by the Disneyland Resort-based WDI site team, headed by art director Kim Irvine. Most of the changes were cosmetic, as much of the structure was left over from the Tarzan incarnation. Audio-Animatronic animals were added throughout to give the treehouse vignettes movement and life. The treehouse's waterwheel was re-created using a mold of the original Swiss Family Treehouse waterwheel, which was preserved (in pieces) by the Walt Disney Archives.

The Adventureland Treehouse opened on November 10, 2023.

== Premise ==
"We thought about the Swiss Family Robinson story, but thought maybe that wasn’t that relevant to people of today. So what if we are inspired by that story and it is about a family that made this amazing home together out of their sheer creativity and innovativeness, but made it a different family? So we changed up their roles."
–Kim Irvine

The treehouse is inspired by Walt Disney's Swiss Family Robinson film, but does not center around the film's story or the Robinson family. Instead, an unnamed family of five is at the center of the attraction's story, though the details of how and why they built the treehouse are left deliberately vague so guests can imagine themselves in their own adventure. The attraction relies on environmental rather than narrative storytelling—giving guests walking through the 80-foot-tall artificial tree a glimpse into the lives of the family and reveals the interests and personalities of each member.

The father is a chef, with his kitchen on the ground floor. The mother is a musician, and has her own music room with an organ playing "Swisskapolka"—the tune heard from a similar organ in the original Swiss Family Treehouse. The daughter is interested in astronomy and her room features a makeshift telescope, planetary models, and star maps. The twin sons are animal lovers and their presence is felt throughout the treehouse with the many animals the boys collected augmenting each scene.

== Legacy ==
The Adventureland Treehouse contains a few references to the attraction's previous incarnations, as well as other Disney theme park attractions and films.

- The family's pet ostrich is named Jane after Jane Porter, the heroine from Tarzan.
- "Swisskapolka," the tune written by Norman "Buddy" Baker that was featured in the original Swiss Family Treehouse and the Swiss Family Robinson film, is still heard from the organ in the mother's music room.
- A book titled A Direct Guide to Treehouse Living sits next to a gramophone on one of the treehouse balconies. The book is credited to Kenneth Cooper Annakin, the man who directed Disney's Swiss Family Robinson, among a few other Disney films.
- A Victrola in one of the treehouse's upper rooms has a color scheme evoking Encanto—a reference to the film being considered as a potential theme for the treehouse.
- The daughter has a banner from the Society of Explorers and Adventurers (S.E.A.) hanging in her room. This fictional organization has story connections to many attractions and locations across Disney's theme parks worldwide, including the Jungle Cruise; Mystic Manor at Hong Kong Disneyland; Tower of Terror and Soaring: Fantastic Flight at Tokyo DisneySea, Big Thunder Mountain Railroad at Magic Kingdom Park, Oceaneer Lab on the Disney Cruise Line, and Miss Adventure Falls in Typhoon Lagoon. Fortress Explorations at Tokyo DisneySea is the organization's fictional headquarters.
