= Susanna Mary Paull =

British author and translator

- Born: 1812; London
- Died: 1888
- Occupations: Translator, writer

Susanna Mary Paull (1812–1888) was a British writer and translator who published under the name Mrs. H. B. Paull. She is known for her English translations of the fairy tales of the Brothers Grimm and Hans Christian Andersen and the book Swiss Family Robinson.

Susanna Mary Peakome was born in 1812 in London, the daughter of saddler William Peakome. In 1838, she married Henry Hugh Beams Paull, an Oxford-educated clergyman. Upon the loss of his voice, his wife was forced to a career in writing to support the couple, publishing dozens of religious and children's books.

Her translations of Andersen's fairy tales have been among the most popular and widely published. Around 1900, one publisher had twelve separate editions of Paull's translations in print. Her translation was the first in English of the version of Swiss Family Robinson expanded by Isabelle de Montolieu.

== Bibliography ==
- Questions and Answers on Useful Subjects (3rd edition), 1849.
- First Principles of General Knowledge, 1853.
- The Doctor's Vision: An Allegory. 1 vol. London: Bell and Daldy, 1855.
- Lucy West: or, The Orphans of Highcliff. 1 vol. London: Frederick Warne, 1866.
- The Means and the End: or, The Chaplain's Secret. A Tale in which Ritualism and its Errors are Traced. 1 vol. London: Houlston and Co., 1867.
- Mary Elton: or, Self-Control. 1 vol. London: Frederick Warne, 1869.
- Pride and Principle: or, The Captain of Elvoden School. 1 vol. London: Frederick Warne, 1869.
- Tom Watson: or, The Law of Kindness. 1 vol. London: Frederick Warne, 1869.
- Miss Herbert's Key's: or, Honesty in Little Thinks. 1 vol. London: Sunday School Union, 1871.
- A Boy's Trials. London, 1874.
- Breaking the Rules: A Tale of School-boy Life. 1 vol. London: Sunday School Union, 1872.
- The Greatest is Charity. London, 1872.
- Margaret Ford: or, What a Young Girl Can Do. 1 vol. London: Sunday School Union, 1872.
- Mabel's School Days. 1 vol. London: Jarrold and Son, 1872.
- Trevor Court. 3 vol. London: Hurst and Blackett, 1872.
- All Things New. London, 1874.
- Dora's Difficulty: or, "Charity doth not behave itself unseemly". 1 vol. London: Jarrold and Son, 1874.
- Horace Carleton: or, "Charity vaunteth not itself. 1 vol. London: Jarrold and Son, 1874.
- Evelyn Howard: or, Early Friendships. 1 vol. London: Frederick Warne, 1875.
- The Two Neighbours: A Tale of Domestic Life. 1 vol. London: Houlston and Co., 1875.
- Dick the Sailor: A Tale of the Press-Gang. 1 vol. London: William Macintosh, 1875.
- Frank Merton's Conquest: or, "Charity is not easily provoked". 1 vol. London: Jarrold and Son, 1876.
- School-Day Memories: or, "Charity envieth not". 1 vol. London: Jarrold and Son, 1876.
- Ethel Seymour: or, "Charity hopeth all things". 1 vol. London: Jarrold and Son, 1876.
- Oakfield Lodge: or, "Charity seeketh not her own". 1 vol. London: Jarrold and Son, 1876.
- Walter's Mistake: or, One Thing at a Time. 1 vol. London: Sunday School Union, 1876.
- "Only a Cat": or, The Autobiography of Tom Blackman, a Favourite Cat. 1 vol. London: Routledge, 1876.
- Englefield Grange: or, Mary Armstrong's Troubles. 1 vol. London: Frederick Warne, 1876.
- The Lost Half-Sovereign: or, "Charity thinketh no evil". 1 vol. London: Jarrold and Son, 1876.
- Knowing and Doing. London, 1878.
- Straight Paths and Crooked Ways: A Family Chronicle. 1 vol. London: Frederick Warne, 1878.
- Levelsie Manor. 1 vol. London: Hodder and Stoughton, 1879.
- Mary Hazeldine's Desk. 1 vol. London: Hodder and Stoughton, 1879.
- Harry Foster's Rules. 1 vol. London: Hodder and Stoughton, 1879.
- Alice Brookfield's Trial. 1 vol. London: Hodder and Stoughton, 1879.
- Robert Raikes and his Scholars. 1 vol. London: Sunday School Union, 1880.
- Ethel Graham's Victory. 1 vol. London: R. T. S., 1880.
- Leyton Auberry's Daughters: A Tale. 1 vol. London: Frederick Warne, 1880.
- Jessie Allen's Questions, or Things Old and New. London, 1882.
- Tom Fletcher's Fortunes. London, 1882.
- Uncle John's Christmas Story. London, 1882.
- Alice Wilmot's Secret. London, 1883.
- Minatoo: or, Little Frankie's Bearer. A Story of the Indian Mutiny. 1 vol. London: R. T. S., 1883.
- The Owners of Broadlands. 1 vol. London: Hodder and Stoughton, 1885.
- Patty Thorne's Adventures. London, 1885.
- Eva Grant's Escape. 1 vol. London: Hodder and Stoughton, 1886.
- Mabel Berrington's Faith: and Other Stories. 1 vol. London: Jarrold and Son, 1886.
- Grecian History
- Roman History
- Introduction to French Grammar
