= Craig Heller =

American television soap opera script writer

Craig Heller is an American television soap opera script writer. Heller has worked as a scriptwriter on the following series:

- As the World Turns (2001–2004)
- Full House
- General Hospital
- Guiding Light (1997–2000; 2004–2005)
- Happy Days
- Jailbirds
- Return to Green Acres

== Awards and nominations ==
Daytime Emmy Award

- Nomination, 1998, Best Writing, General Hospital
- Win, 1999, Best Writing, General Hospital
- Nomination, 2000, Best Writing, General Hospital
- Win, 2002, Best Writing, As the World Turns
- Nomination, 2003, Best Writing, As the World Turns
- Win, 2004, Best Writing, As the World Turns
- Win, 2005, Best Writing, As the World Turns

Writers Guild of America Award

- Win, 1997, Best Writing, General Hospital
- Nomination, 1998, Best Writing, General Hospital
