= Beverly Hills Family Robinson =

- VHS cover
- Genre: Comedy
- Based on: Swiss Family Robinson by Lowell S. Hawley; The Swiss Family Robinson by Johann David Wyss
- Teleplay by: T.C. Smith
- Directed by: Troy Miller
- Starring: Dyan Cannon; Martin Mull; Sarah Michelle Gellar; Ryan O'Donohue
- Music by: Philip Marshall
- Country of origin: United States
- Original language: English

Production
- Executive producers: George Zaloom; Les Mayfield
- Producers: Jeffrey Lampert; Irwin Marcus
- Cinematography: Roger Lanser
- Editor: Duane Hartzell
- Running time: 88 minutes
- Production companies: Zaloom/Mayfield Productions; Walt Disney Television

Original release
- Network: ABC
- Release: January 25, 1997

Beverly Hills Family Robinson is a 1997 American comedy television film directed by Troy Miller and written by T.C. Smith. It is a remake of the 1960 Walt Disney film Swiss Family Robinson, itself based on the 1812 novel The Swiss Family Robinson by Johann David Wyss. The film stars Dyan Cannon, Martin Mull, Sarah Michelle Gellar and Ryan O'Donohue. It aired on ABC on January 25, 1997, as an episode of The Wonderful World of Disney.

== Plot ==
Marsha Robinson is a famous TV personality and has her own lifestyle and cooking show. She lives in Beverly Hills, California with her dentist husband Doug, her daughter Jane and her son Roger. The show takes her and her family to Hawaii. When the Robinsons arrive in Honolulu their yacht is captured by 'modern pirates' at night and when they wake up in the morning they find themselves and their unbidden guests on the open sea. But being the Robinsons they trick the pirates and leave them behind in a lifeboat.

The Robinsons try to sail to the next harbor, the yacht gets into a storm and the family shipwrecks on a deserted island. Marsha threatens her husband with a nervous breakdown. And the rest of the family isn't fond of their situation either. But nobody saves them and nobody knows where they are. So there's nothing to do but settle in, survive and build a tree house.

Life on the island turns into routine, although Marsha films herself while giving statements about her family's miserable situation after the shipwreck - just in case they'll be saved and she has footage for TV shows.

Meanwhile the pirates have been stranded on the island, too, which the Robinsons do not know. The island also has an inhabitant, a shipwrecked surfer named Digger, who secretly eats all of Marsha's chocolates. The Robinsons get to know him when Doug has an underwater accident and needs to be saved by a good swimmer. Jane falls in love with him. He helps the Robinsons finish their treehouse and becomes a member of the family.

The pirates discover the Robinsons and now the Robinsons need to struggle with the unbidden guests once again.

== Cast ==
- Dyan Cannon as Marsha Robinson
- Martin Mull as Doug Robinson
- Sarah Michelle Gellar as Jane Robinson
- Ryan O'Donohue as Roger Robinson
- Josh Picker as Digger
- Kevin Weisman as Brinx
- Michael Edward-Stevens as Claude
- Nique Needles as Melvin
- Isuara Gualberto as Cha Cha
- Jennifer Holt as Production Assistant
- Jeffrey Lampert as Producer

== Production ==
Filming took place in Far North Queensland, Australia from January 25 to February 23, 1996.

== See also ==
List of television films produced for American Broadcasting Company
