= Golden Apple Award =

American award

The Golden Apple Award (1941–2001) was an American award presented to entertainers by the Hollywood Women's Press Club, usually in recognition of behavior rather than performance.

== History ==
The award was presented from 1941 until 2001, when the Hollywood Women's Press Club became inactive. The awards ceremony included Golden Apples to recognize actors for being easy to work with, as well as the Sour Apple Award (not presented in some years) chastising actors for being rude or difficult. Winners of the former include Bob Hope (1941), Joan Fontaine (1947), Mae West (1969) and Billy Crystal (1989) and winners of the latter include Joan Fontaine (1943), Frank Sinatra (1946, 1951, and 1974), Elvis Presley (1966), Joan Rivers (1983), and Dale Robertson (3 times).

From 1941 to 1966, the Golden Apple winners were specifically called "The Most Cooperative Actor/Actress", while the Sour Apple winners were specifically called "The Least Cooperative Actor/Actress". Starting in 1967, the Golden Apple winners were specifically called "The Male/Female Star of the Year", while the Sour Apple winner was called, simply, "The Sour Apple Winner". From 1974 onwards, there were additional—though sporadic—presentations of Golden Apples for "New Star", "New Discovery", "Daytime Star" and "Hollywood Legend".

=== Louella Parsons Award ===
The Louella Parsons Award was introduced in 1970. This "Lifetime Achievement" award was named for columnist Louella Parsons, founder of the Hollywood Women's Press Club. Recipients include Danny Thomas (1970), Bob Hope (1975), Henry Winkler (1982), George Sidney (1995), Kirk Douglas (1999), Aaron Spelling (1998), and Liz Smith (2000).
