= Jenny's War =

- Genre: War drama
- Based on: Jenny's War by Jack Stoneley
- Screenplay by: Steve Gethers
- Directed by: Steve Gethers
- Starring: Dyan Cannon; Elke Sommer; Hugh Grant; John Moulder-Brown; Nigel Hawthorne; Robert Hardy; Christopher Cazenove
- Theme music composer: John Cacavas
- Country of origin: United Kingdom
- Original language: English
- No. of series: 1
- No. of episodes: 4

Production
- Producer: Peter Graham Scott
- Camera setup: 16mm film
- Running time: c. 50 minutes per episode
- Production companies: HTV; Columbia Pictures Television

Original release
- Network: ITV
- Release: 3 June – 24 June 1985

Jenny's War is a 1985 war drama television serial set during World War II, made by HTV in association with Columbia Pictures Television. It is directed by and written by Steve Gethers. The screenplay is based on the novel with the same name by Jack Stoneley. In the UK it was shown as four 50-minute episodes on the ITV network, while in the United States it was syndicated under the Operation Prime Time banner by MCA TV.

The serial stars Dyan Cannon, Nigel Hawthorne, Robert Hardy, Christopher Cazenove and Hugh Grant, and is about a mother, Jenny Baines (Cannon), who searches for her son Peter (Grant), who was shot down over Germany, and who she believes is still alive.

The concentration camp site scenes were shot in the grounds of Thoresby Hall in the Nottinghamshire countryside during the National Union of Mineworkers strike. In the film the prison camp was known as Stalag Luft 4B but in reality it was a group of disused billet huts in some woods at Thoresby Hall, which was then owned by the Coal Board and which has now been turned into a day spa.

Bredon School's Pull Court was used as a Nazi headquarters.

A short mini-series made for TV, Jenny's War was first screened on ITV and subsequently released on VHS.

== Plot ==
In 1941, Jenny Baines, an American living in England learns that her son, an RAF flier, has been shot down over Germany. Jenny goes into Germany, both as a courier for British Intelligence and also to search for her son. She enlists the help of Karl, her estranged husband who is also a Nazi officer, and he informs her that her son is dead.

But Jenny is resourceful and discovers that her son Peter may be in a German POW camp. However, her enquiries have attracted the attention of the Gestapo and she must disguise herself as a man to avoid capture.
