= Sally Stanford =

American madam and mayor

Sally Stanford (née Mabel Janice Busby, and political pseudonym Marsha Owen; May 5, 1903 – February 1, 1982) was an American madam, restaurateur, city council member, and a former mayor of Sausalito, California. From 1940 to 1949, she was madam of a brothel at 1144 Pine Street in the Nob Hill neighborhood of San Francisco, in a house designed by architect Stanford White.

== Early life ==
Born Mabel Janice Busby, in Baker City, Oregon in 1903. Stanford moved to San Francisco in 1924. She adopted the name Stanford as one of many pseudonyms. According to her autobiography Lady of the House, she saw a newspaper headline about Stanford University's winning a football game and adopted the surname.

== Madam ==
Stanford ran one of San Francisco's more notorious brothels. San Francisco Chronicle columnist Herb Caen wrote "the United Nations was founded at Sally Stanford's whorehouse" because of the number of delegates to the organization's 1945 San Francisco founding conference who were Stanford's customers; many actual, if informal, negotiating sessions took place in the brothel's living room. Then-San Francisco district attorney Pat Brown's raid on the establishment helped lead to his 1950 election as attorney general for the State of California. The building was demolished in 1961 to build a condominium.

In her autobiography, Stanford wrote: "Madaming is the sort of thing that happens to you—like getting a battlefield commission or becoming the dean of women at Stanford University."

In 1967, Stanford made a surprise appearance at the men's luncheon during the California Jaycees Annual Convention. She paraded into the San Francisco Hilton ballroom wearing a feathered boa flowing down over an ornate, floor-length gown. Seated at the main table were Senator Edward Kennedy, Mayor Joseph Alioto, attorney Melvin Belli and the newly elected California Jaycees president Drew Frohlich. She took the podium after greeting each dignitary with a hug and a kiss on the cheek. Stanford then brought the house down by naming each one in turn as a past or present customer.

== Politics and civic affairs ==
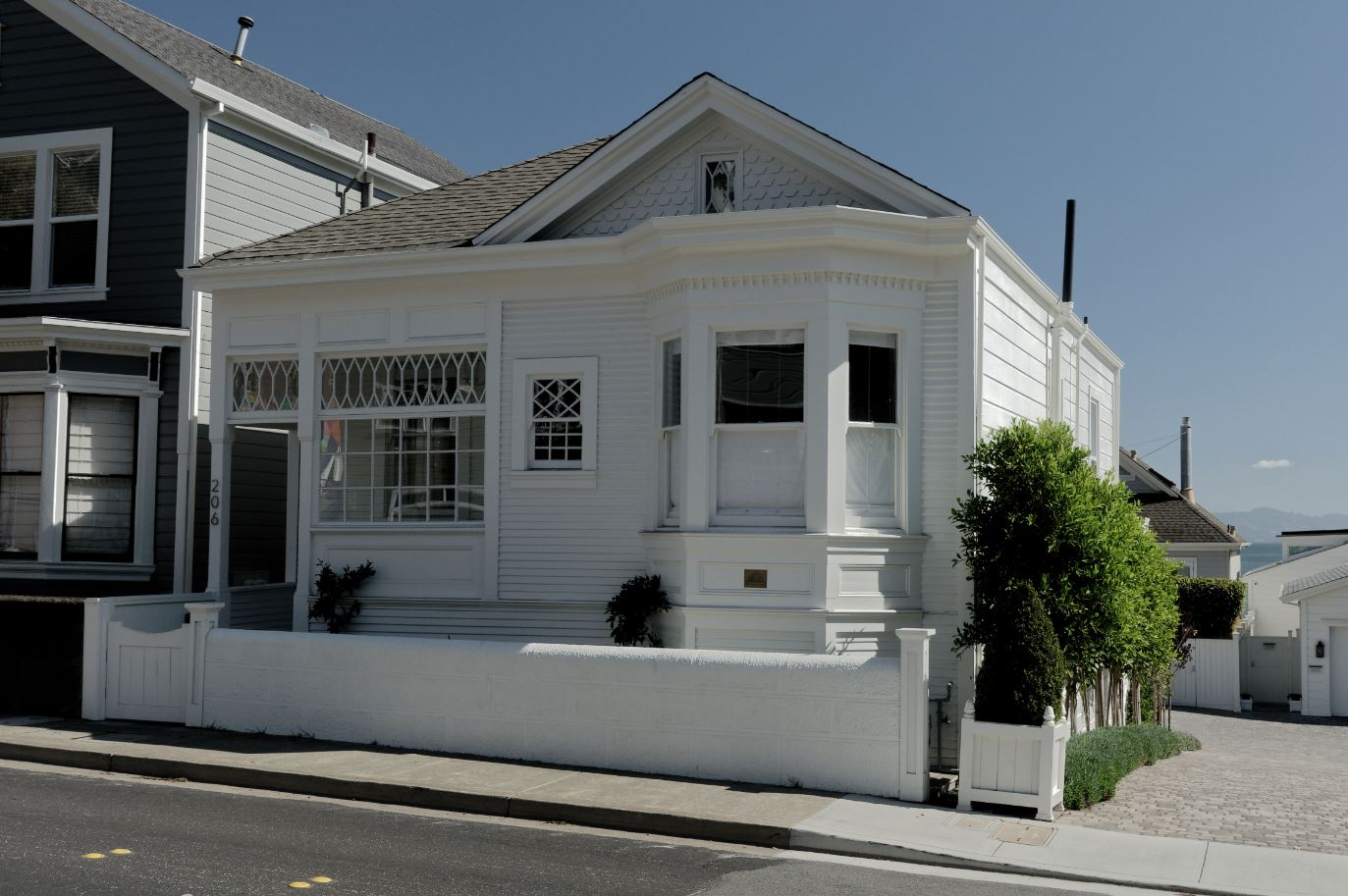
Sally Stanford House at 206 Second St., Sausalito, California.

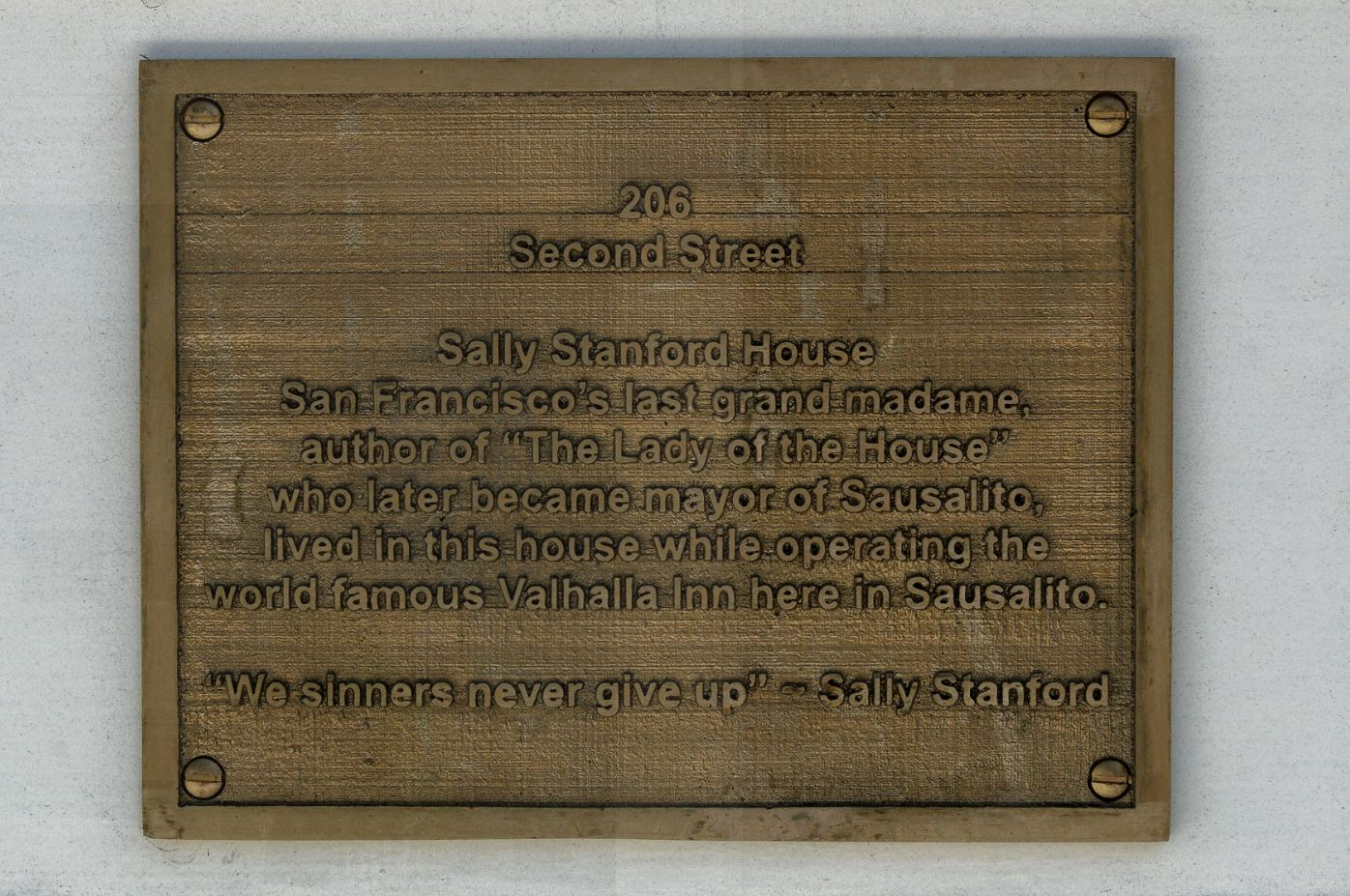
Plaque on Sally Stanford's House at 206 Second St., Sausalito, California.

In 1950, Stanford reopened the old Valhalla restaurant in Sausalito, California as the Valhalla and took up residency in Sausalito. The opening night was filled with music, lights, and notables from San Francisco and a few Sausalito "celebrities" as well. In 1953, Stanford invested in Peggy Tolk–Watkins' nightclub Tin Angel on the Embarcadero in San Francisco.

With her new residency she became active in local civic affairs. She ran six times for the Sausalito City Council before winning election in 1972 and was elected mayor in 1976. She also served as vice-president of the chamber of commerce and sponsored a little league team in 1976.

In 1985, the City of Sausalito commissioned a drinking fountain to honor Sally and her dog Leland. Local potter Eric Norstad constructed a multiple-person drinking fountain with a basin inscribed with the words "Have a drink on Sally." The runoff poured to a long knee height basin that reads "Have a drink on Leland" for the dogs visiting the site. The drinking fountain is at the Sausalito Ferry Pier.

Stanford died of a heart attack at 78 in Marin General Hospital.

== On film ==
- Lady of the House (1978), TV movie starring Dyan Cannon

== Bibliography ==
- Stanford, Sally, with Bob Patterson, Lady of the House (1966) (autobiography)

== Sources ==
- Gentry, Curt, The Madams of San Francisco (1964)
