= The End of Innocence (film) =

1990 film by Dyan Cannon

- DVD artwork
- Directed by: Dyan Cannon
- Written by: Dyan Cannon
- Produced by: Leonard Rabinowitz; Stanley Fimberg
- Starring: Dyan Cannon; John Heard
- Cinematography: Alex Nepomniaschy
- Edited by: Bruce Cannon
- Music by: Michael Convertino
- Distributed by: Skouras Pictures
- Release date: December 6, 1990
- Running time: 102 minutes
- Country: United States
- Language: English

The End of Innocence is a 1990 American semi-autobiographical film starring, written and directed by Dyan Cannon. It was produced by Leonard Rabinowitz and Stanley Fimberg.

== Plot ==
Unwanted and ignored by her eternally squabbling parents, a young girl is spiritually torn apart by forces beyond her control. Her parents do further damage to her battered psyche by giving her mixed messages concerning sex and religion. However, her self-esteem dwindles to microscopic proportions on account of a series of worthless boyfriends. After suffering a nervous breakdown, she is placed in an asylum, where she is treated for the first time as a human being rather than a nuisance by a compassionate psychiatrist.

== Cast ==
- Dyan Cannon as Stephanie
  - Alison Sweeney as Stephanie, 12–15 Years Old
  - Rebecca Schaeffer as Stephanie, 18–25 Years Old
- John Heard as Dean
- Stephen Meadows as Michael
- George Coe as Dad
- Lola Mason as Mom
- Leslie A. Pam as Dr. Humphries
- Dennis Burkley as "Tiny"
- Michael Madsen as Earl
- Viveka Davis as "Honey"
- Renée Taylor as Angel
- Billie Bird as Mrs. Yabledablov
- Stoney Jackson as Leroy
- Madge Sinclair as Nurse Bowlin
- Eric Harrison as Chester
- Paul Lieber as Rabbi
- Johnny Segal as Ernie
- Arlene Golonka as Claire
- Todd Field as Richard
- James Holmes as David
- Diana Barrows as Arlene
- Stephanie Blackmore as Department Head
- Romy Rosemont as Waitress
- James Shanta as Guy In The Park
- Jack McGee as Officer Jake
- Bill Moseley as Man On The Hill
- Connie Sawyer as Grandma
- Albert Henderson as Grandpa

== Casting ==
The End of Innocence marks the final film appearance of Rebecca Schaeffer before her murder on July 18, 1989; it was released posthumously, and was the debut film appearance of future Days of Our Lives star Alison Sweeney.
