= Ryan O'Donohue =

American actor

- Born: Ryan Sean O'Donohue; April 26, 1984 (age 42); Pomona, California, U.S.
- Education: University of La Verne; Fullerton College
- Occupation: Actor
- Years active: 1994–present
- Spouse: Veronica Faye Dean (m. 2004)
- Children: 1

Ryan Sean O'Donohue (born April 26, 1984) is an American actor best known for his role as Zeke Byrd in the 1994 television series The Byrds of Paradise.

== Early life and career ==
O'Donohue was born Ryan Sean O'Donohue on April 26, 1984 in Pomona, California, to Anita Lynne (née Rultenberg) and Sean Patrick O'Donohue. He was raised in San Dimas, California. He has a younger sister named Windy (b. 1987).

O'Donohue is known for his role as Zeke Byrd on the 1994 ABC drama The Byrds of Paradise. He then starred as Peter Hansen in the 1994 CBS sitcom The Boys Are Back alongside Hal Linden and Suzanne Pleshette. As a voice actor, O'Donohue voiced Matt McGinnis in Batman Beyond, Demyx in the Kingdom Hearts video game franchise, Randall Weems in Recess, and young Kovu in The Lion King II: Simba's Pride.

== Personal life ==
O'Donohue married Veronica Faye Dean on June 15, 2004. Together they have one child, a daughter, named Hazel Ryan O'Donohue, who was born in December 2004. Through their daughter, O'Donohue and his wife have two grandchilden, a grandson (b. August 9, 2023) and a granddaughter (b. August 25, 2025).

== Filmography ==
=== Film ===
| Year | Title | Role | Notes |
|---|---|---|---|
| 1995 | Demon Knight | Danny | |
| 1995 | Spot's Magical Christmas | Spot (voice) | Video short |
| 1995 | Toy Story | Kid (voice) | |
| 1997 | Dog of Flanders | Young George (voice) | English dub |
| 1998 | A Bug's Life | Grub (voice) | |
| 1998 | Spot and his Grandparents Go to the Carnival | Spot (voice) | Video short |
| 1998 | The Lion King II: Simba's Pride | Young Kovu (voice) | Direct-to-video |
| 1999 | The Iron Giant | Student (voice) | |
| 1999 | Toy Story 2 | Additional voices | |
| 2000 | Batman Beyond: Return of the Joker | Matt McGinnis (voice) | Direct-to-video |
| 2001 | Recess: School's Out | Randall Weems, Digger Dave (voice) | |
| 2006 | Whisper of the Heart | High School Student (voice) | English dub |

=== Television ===
| Year | Title | Role | Notes |
|---|---|---|---|
| 1994 | The Byrds of Paradise | Zeke Byrd | 12 episodes |
| 1994–1995 | The Boys Are Back | Peter Hansen | 18 episodes |
| 1995 | What-a-Mess | What-A-Mess, Santa Claus (voice) | |
| 1997–2001 | Recess | Randall Weems, Digger Dave (voice) | 17 episodes |
| 1997 | Beverly Hills Family Robinson | Roger Robinson | Television film |
| 1997 | Superman: The Animated Series | Boy (voice) | Episode: "Identity Crisis" |
| 1998 | The New Batman Adventures | Matt (voice) | Episode: "Legends of the Dark Knight" |
| 1998 | Safety Patrol | Coop | Television film |
| 1998 | Mr. Murder | Young Alfie | Miniseries |
| 1999–2001 | Batman Beyond | Matt McGinnis (voice) | 12 episodes |

=== Video games ===
| Year | Title | Voice role | Notes |
|---|---|---|---|
| 1995 | Disney's Activity Center: The Lion King | Young Simba | |
| 1997 | 101 Dalmatians: Escape from DeVil Manor | Whizzer | |
| 2000 | The Lion King: Simba's Mighty Adventure | Young Kovu | |
| 2006 | Kingdom Hearts II | Demyx | English dub |
| 2007 | Kingdom Hearts II Final Mix | Demyx | English dub |
| 2009 | Kingdom Hearts 358/2 Days | Demyx | English dub |
| 2013 | Kingdom Hearts HD 1.5 Remix | Demyx | English dub |
| 2014 | Kingdom Hearts HD 2.5 Remix | Demyx | English dub |
| 2019 | Kingdom Hearts III | Demyx | English dub |

== Awards and nominations ==
O'Donohue was nominated for the Best Young Performer in a Voice-Over award at the 19th Youth in Film Awards, for his performance in the first season of Recess.
