= Deathtrap (film) =

1982 film

- Theatrical release poster by Bill Gold
- Directed by: Sidney Lumet
- Screenplay by: Jay Presson Allen
- Based on: Deathtrap; 1978 play by Ira Levin
- Produced by: Burtt Harris
- Starring: Michael Caine; Christopher Reeve; Dyan Cannon
- Cinematography: Andrzej Bartkowiak
- Edited by: Jack Fitzstephens
- Music by: Johnny Mandel
- Distributed by: Warner Bros. Pictures
- Release date: March 19, 1982
- Running time: 116 minutes
- Country: United States
- Language: English
- Budget: $10 million
- Box office: $19 million

Deathtrap is a 1982 American black comedy suspense film based on the 1978 play of the same name by Ira Levin. It was directed by Sidney Lumet from a screenplay by Levin and Jay Presson Allen, and stars Michael Caine, Christopher Reeve and Dyan Cannon. Critics gave the film mostly favorable reviews while describing its plot similarities to Caine's 1972 film Sleuth.

The film narrates the tale of famous playwright Sidney Bruhl, who has not had any hits in recent years. After his student Clifford Anderson entrusts him with the manuscript of a promising play, Sidney tells his wife Myra that if the student has not told anyone else about his play, he could kill Clifford and claim the manuscript as his own.

== Plot ==
Playwright Sidney Bruhl debuts his latest in a series of flops and returns home. Dejected, he reveals to his wife, Myra, that he has received an excellent manuscript, Deathtrap, from an unlikely former student, Clifford Anderson, asking for Sidney's input. Cynically, he reflects that the best idea he has had lately is to murder its author and produce the play as his own.

In a telephone conversation with Clifford, Sidney invites him to their home to discuss the Deathtrap script. Sidney asks Clifford to be sure to bring all copies of the script to work on. Clifford comments that he is unable to make any copies due to his local photocopier being broken. This reassures Sidney, who comments to Myra that no copies of the script will be found after he claims authorship. To no avail, Myra tries to convince Sidney to work with Clifford as equal partners. Clifford admires Sidney's collection of stage props, and Sidney entices him to try on a pair of Harry Houdini's handcuffs, then strangles him with a chain.

Sidney removes the body, which he says he will bury on the property, but has difficulty convincing a traumatized Myra to conspire with him. When Sidney returns from burying the body, Myra insists that Sidney must buy the property from her and that they will discreetly divorce. She reveals nothing during an unexpected visit from psychic neighbor Helga Ten Dorp. Helga senses pain and death in the house, warning Sidney about a man in boots who will attack him.

As the Bruhls prepare for bed, a mud-spattered Clifford bursts through the bedroom window and beats Sidney with a log, then chases Myra through the house until her weak heart gives out and she dies.

Descending the stairs, uninjured, Sidney joins Clifford. They discuss what to do with Myra's body, then kiss. The previous events have been a ruse to kill Myra, the wealthy spouse, without laying a hand on her. Clifford moves in and the two work on separate literary projects at a partner's desk. Sidney suffers writer's block, but Clifford types page after page of a play that he keeps under lock and key.

Sidney does not trust Clifford, a sociopath with an extensive criminal record; when Clifford is out of the room, he switches Clifford's manuscript with a fake. Sidney is horrified to read that Clifford is using Myra's murder as the basis of a new play called Deathtrap. He confronts Clifford, who boasts about the play's potential and insists he will write it with or without Sidney's approval. Sidney plays along with collaborating while he plots a solution. Helga stops by for candles in anticipation of a thunderstorm, warning Sidney that Clifford is the man in boots.

To demonstrate a plot point, Sidney asks Clifford to arm himself with an axe, then produces a gun. He intends to shoot Clifford, claim it was in self-defense, and dispose of the Deathtrap manuscript. The gun is empty. In anticipation, Clifford had loaded the bullets into a different gun. Manacling Sidney to a chair, Clifford reveals that he intentionally flagged his locked manuscript, which he left unattended so Sidney would read it and give him the third act to his play by his actions. He warns Sidney not to try to stop the production of the play.

Clifford is unaware the manacles are trick shackles. Sidney releases himself, grabs a crossbow, and shoots Clifford in the back. The storm hits and the house suffers a blackout. A flash of lightning illuminates Helga scurrying through the room, thinking Sidney is in danger and coming to help. She realizes it is Sidney that actually poses the threat and grabs a gun while he finds a knife. Clifford regains consciousness and trips Helga. A struggle for the gun ensues. Clifford swings the axe at Sidney.

In that very moment, the scene transitions to a stage version of itself, with actors before a full house. The onstage struggle culminates with "Clifford" stabbing "Sidney" and both dying, leaving "Helga" victorious. The opening night audience erupts in applause. At the back of the theater stands an exultant Helga Ten Dorp, author of hit Broadway play Deathtrap.

== Cast ==
- Michael Caine as Sidney Bruhl
- Christopher Reeve as Clifford Anderson
- Dyan Cannon as Myra Bruhl
- Irene Worth as Helga Ten Dorp
- Henry Jones as Porter Milgrim
- Joe Silver as Seymour Starger

Cast notes

- Real-life film and theatre critics Stewart Klein, Jeffrey Lyons and Joel Siegel have cameo appearances as themselves.

== Reception ==
Critic Roger Ebert gave it three stars out of four, calling it "a comic study of ancient and honorable human defects, including greed, envy, lust, pride, avarice, sloth, and falsehood." Ebert, along with Janet Maslin, and Gary Arnold of The Washington Post described the similarities to Michael Caine's 1972 film Sleuth, and similarities have subsequently been described by film historians.

Dyan Cannon was nominated for a Golden Raspberry Award for Worst Supporting Actress for her performance at the 3rd Golden Raspberry Awards.

The kissing scene between Sidney Bruhl (Caine) and Clifford Anderson (Christopher Reeve) is not in the original play. In his book The Celluloid Closet, gay film historian Vito Russo reports that Reeve said that the kiss was booed by preview audiences in Denver, Colorado, and estimated that a Time magazine report of the kiss spoiled a key plot element and cost the film $10 million in ticket sales. (The film earned more than $19 million at the box office.) In his book Murder Most Queer (2014), Jordan Schildcrout describes attending a screening at which an audience member screamed, "No, Superman, don't do it!" at the moment of the Caine–Reeve kiss.

Deathtrap has a positive rating of 75% at Rotten Tomatoes based on 20 reviews, with an average rating of 6.8/10. Metacritic, which uses a weighted average, assigned the film a score of 54 out of 100, based on 8 critics, indicating "mixed or average" reviews.

== Home media ==
Deathtrap was released on Region 1 DVD on July 27, 1999. It was re-released on November 8, 2003, as half of a two-pack with the Henry Winkler/Michael Keaton buddy film Night Shift. Warner Home Video released Deathtrap on Blu-ray disc on November 20, 2012, as part of the Warner Archive Collection.
