= Lady of the House (1978 film) =

1978 American biographical drama television film

- Genre: Drama
- Based on: Lady of the House by Sally Stanford
- Screenplay by: Ron Koslow
- Directed by: Ralph Nelson; Vincent Sherman
- Starring: Dyan Cannon; Armand Assante
- Music by: Fred Karlin
- Country of origin: United States
- Original language: English

Production
- Executive producer: William Kayden
- Running time: 100 min.

Original release
- Network: NBC
- Release: November 14, 1978

Lady of the House is an American television biographical film about Sally Stanford, co-directed by Ralph Nelson and Vincent Sherman. The screenplay by Ron Koslow is based on Stanford's autobiography of the same name. The film was broadcast by NBC on November 14, 1978.

== Cast ==
- Dyan Cannon as Sally Stanford
- Armand Assante as Ernest de Paulo
- Zohra Lampert as Julia de Paulo
- Susan Tyrrell as Helen Proctor
- Jesse Dizon as Acapico
- Maggie Cooper as Kate de Paulo
- Anthony Charnota as Ray Navarette
- Colleen Camp as Rosette
- Kim Hamilton as Mary
- Sam Freed as John David
- Melvin Belli as Mayor Jim of San Francisco
- Charlie Murphy as Mayor Collins
- Christopher Norris as Young Marcie
- Tom Rosqui as Sergeant John Guffy
- Christopher S. Nelson as Dan
- Patricia Wilson as Mrs. Bowan
- Chris Cistaro as John David, age 11
- Julius Varnado as Jadison
- Al Cingolani as Policeman 2
- Anthony Cistaro as John David, age 15
- Gregory Gillbergh as William
- Tony Katsaras as Boat owner
- Carl D. Parker as City Councilman
- Jay S. Sandler as Sally Stanford's son
- Judith Weston as Bertha Tugwell

== Critical response ==
Kevin Thomas of the Los Angeles Times called it "an absorbing two hours that affords Dyan Cannon the biggest and best role she's ever had."

== Awards ==
In 1979, Leo Lotito Jr. and Nicholas Pagliaro were nominated for an Emmy Award for Outstanding Achievement in Makeup.
