= Eric Norstad =

American potter and architect

- Born: March 21, 1924; Valhalla, New York
- Died: January 14, 2013 (aged 88); San Francisco Bay Area, California, U.S.
- Occupations: Potter and architect
- Writing career
- Literary movement: Arts and Crafts Movement

Eric Norstad (1924–2013) was an American potter and architect who worked primarily on the west coast of the United States.

== Biography ==
=== Early life and education ===
Norstad was born in Valhalla, New York, the youngest of four children born to Magnus Norstad, a Norwegian American commercial artist who painted magazine covers and oils of western scenes, and Lillian Rosland, a Swedish American miniature dried flower artist. Magnus and Lillian met in Portland, Oregon where they both worked at an advertising agency.

During World War II, Norstad was drafted into the Army Air Forces and served in Egypt. Following the war, he moved with his parents to San Bernardino County in Southern California. In 1951, Norstad enrolled at the University of Oregon on the GI Bill where he met Ruth Luebke, a creative writing major. In 1953, Norstad and Luebke were wed. Norstad graduated with a degree in architecture with a minor in ceramics. In 1955, the first of their four children was born.

=== Career ===
After graduation, Norstad was offered work as a draftsman at Harmon, Prey, and Detrich, an architecture firm in Seattle, Washington. To subsidize his career as an aspiring architect Norstad began making stoneware pottery. In 1957, Norstad was the recipient of a The Louis Comfort Tiffany Foundation grant, which enabled him to build a small kiln and set up a pottery operation from their home. Many of Norstad's early patrons were fellow architects, artists, and classmates. Norstad started as a kitchen potter making mugs, jugs, bowls and plates. In the late 1950s Norstad began judging state fairs and pottery shows and teaching workshops through the Association of Clay and Glass Artists of California.

In 1959, Norstad moved his growing family to Marin County, California. He built a kiln in the basement of their new home and began selling pots at street fairs and at word of mouth home pottery sales. In 1960, Norstad was asked to join architects Warren Callister and Jack Payne as an architect at their firm, Callister and Payne, in Tiburon, California. Norstad worked on multiple residential projects in Northern California while continuing to make ceramics on the side. Soon, Callister and other architects began commissioning unique ceramic pieces from Norstad such as fireplace fronts, chimney pots, large planter pots, and decorative relief murals.

In 1962, Norstad left Callister and Payne, and opened Norstad Pottery building a larger kiln on their property. Norstad credits much of his success to the right time and place. The 1960s American craft movement was taking off and individual artists were able to make a living. With business booming, Norstad hired other potters to help with production, including Toru Hasegawa, Jack Sears, and Michael Campbell to help with production. During the 1970s, Christopher Westfal, Wynn Hayakawa, Conrad Calimpong, Danny Goodman, and Gary Beaver worked some years in the basement studio.

In 1975, Norstad Pottery moved to a 3,000 square foot studio in Sausalito, California. In 1976, Ruth Norstad opened a retail storefront on Bridgeway Avenue with an emphasis on the basins. The line of pottery continued to expand with stoneware kitchen and bathroom sinks proving very popular. Later they opened a store in Carmel, California. In 1982, Norstad designed an 8,000 square foot pottery which was built in Richmond, California with the help of his three sons, his son in-law, and their friends. Norstad Pottery operated from the Richmond location until Eric Norstad retired in 1998.

Jury at the California State Fair

Early Eric Norstad stoneware container circa 1963

=== Influences and techniques ===
Norstad credits artists Peter Voulkos, Bernard Leach, Shoji Hamada and his parents as influences, as well as clean, functional Scandinavian design of the 1930s, 1940s and 1950s. The stoneware clay that Norstad Pottery mixed was a combination of Kentucky ball clay, California fire clay, and grog- a sand like material. When fired the pieces vitrified into an extremely hard, dense, non-porous material. The mixture was thrown into an old commercial dough mixer with water and the finished batch turned out into plaster trays to age and lose moisture. The clay was then driven through a pug mill, which compresses it and extrudes long plugs of finished clay that is thrown into pots on a wheel. Some clay is rolled into slabs and draped over plaster molds. This treatment, called "jiggering" is a time honored method of producing many pots that are identical. Norstad pots were most noted by their distinctive glazes, often with markings in a Japanese style Sumi-e brushwork. In earlier pieces relief features or decorated carvings were added to the pots. Fired to 2,500 °F (1,370 °C) for 24 hours with high-fire glazes resulted in a smooth, impervious, and very durable finish, resistant to scratching, chipping, and cracks.

Norstad ceramic sinks were tested and approved under the Uniform Plumbing Code by the International Association of Plumbing Officials. The basins were hand thrown inside spinning plaster molds which insured a good degree of uniformity. The mold formed the outside of the basin and the inside is hand crafted.

=== Patrons and exhibits ===
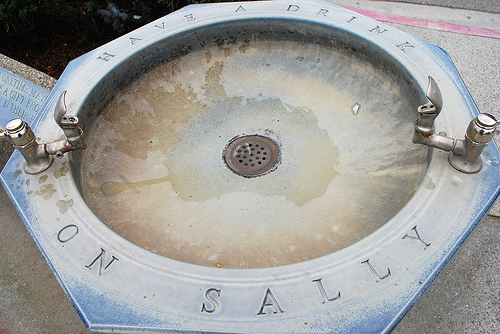
Eric Norstad commissioned drinking fountain in Sausalito California, in remembrance of "Sally Stanford".

The City of Sausalito commissioned Norstad to make a large drinking fountain in honor of former San Francisco Madam and Sausalito Mayor Sally Stanford. The unusual historic landmark is on the waterfront between the Hotel Sausalito and the Sausalito Yacht Club. It is inscribed with "Have a drink on Sally" and has a runoff for the water leading to a long knee-level basin that reads "Have a drink on Leland" in honor of Stanford's beloved dog.

The Oakland Museum of California has an Eric Norstad decorative plate in their collection. Norstad was featured at the Texas A&M International University's Helen Richter Watson Gallery

=== Awards and permanent collections ===
1954, 1962, 1964, 1966 – Syracuse Nationals
1957 – recipient of The Louis Comfort Tiffany Foundation Grant
1990 – recipient of Living Treasure Award
