= Tarzan's Treehouse =

Treetop Walkthrough attraction at Disney parks

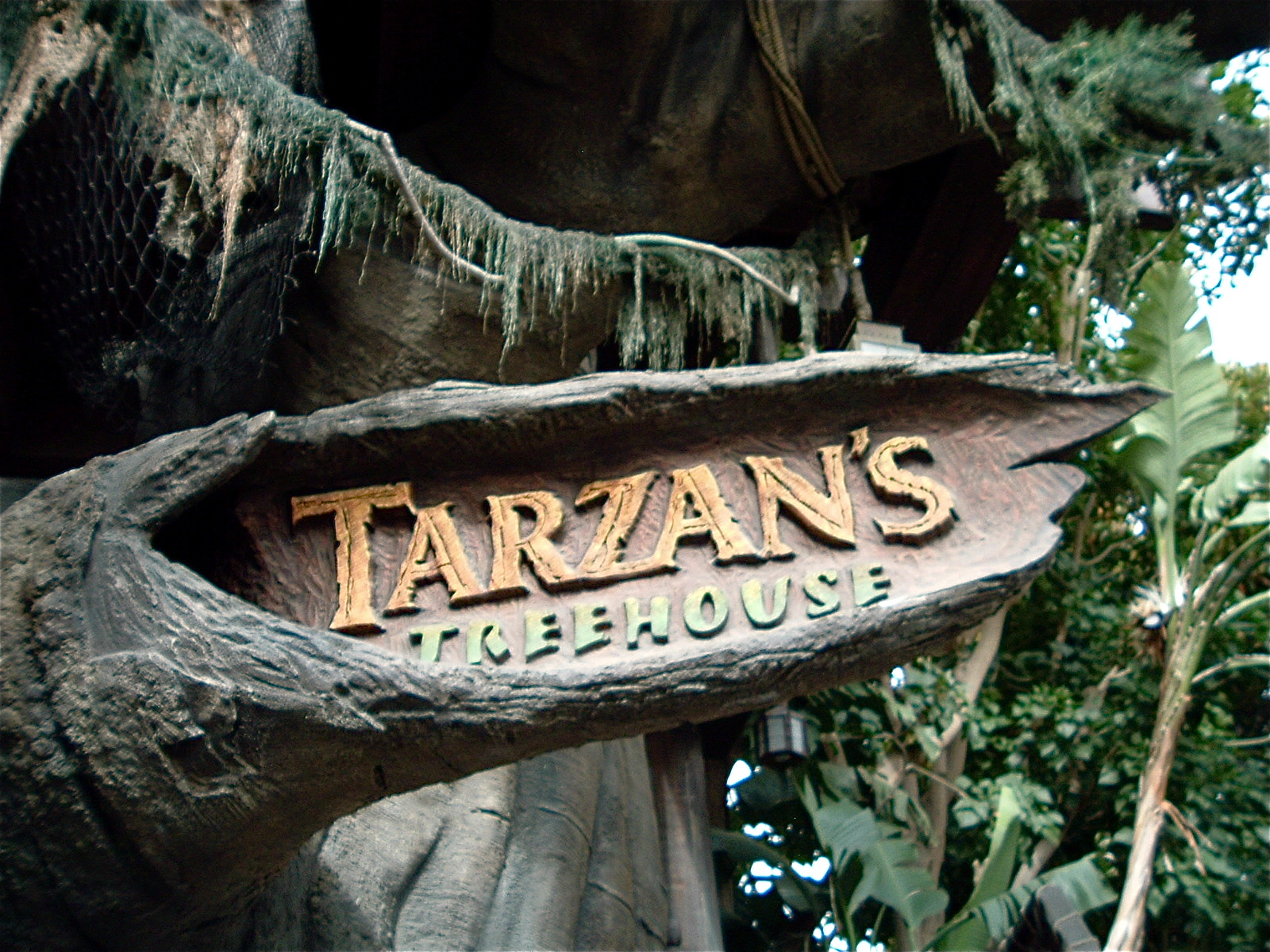
- Tarzan's Treehouse entrance sign as it appeared at Disneyland

Disneyland
- Area: Adventureland
- Status: Closed
- Opening date: June 23, 1999
- Closing date: September 7, 2021
- Replaced: Swiss Family Treehouse
- Replaced by: Adventureland Treehouse

Hong Kong Disneyland
- Area: Adventureland
- Status: Operating
- Opening date: September 12, 2005

Ride statistics
- Theme: Tarzan

Tarzan's Treehouse is a treetop walk-through attraction at Hong Kong Disneyland and formerly at Disneyland in California. It is based on Disney Animation's 1999 film Tarzan.

== Disneyland version ==
In March 1999, Disneyland closed its version of the Swiss Family Treehouse, and Imagineers (specifically Tony Baxter) re-themed the attraction to coincide with the soon-to-be released Tarzan film. The giant artificial tree received a comprehensive makeover, including beefing up the main tree structure, 6,000 replacement vinyl leaves, a suspension bridge from a new entrance via a new neighboring tree, and a variety of hands-on interactive features. The tree was 80 feet (24 m) tall, weighed 150 short tons (140 t), and contained a total of 300,000 vinyl leaves.

On June 23, 1999, Tarzan's Treehouse opened to park guests, just as Disney Animation's Tarzan premiered in movie theaters. Tributes to the Swiss Family Treehouse were featured on in the attraction including the "Mind Thy Head" sign and the "Swisskapolka", which could be heard playing on a vintage gramophone.

In November 2019, a wooden plank of the bridge into Tarzan's Treehouse snapped prompting the attraction to close for a short period for repairs.

In September 2021, the attraction closed for refurbishment, and demolition of the bridge and entrance tree began in April 2022. The treehouse reopened on November 10, 2023, as Adventureland Treehouse—Inspired by Walt Disney's Swiss Family Robinson.

== Hong Kong Disneyland version ==
When Hong Kong Disneyland opened on September 12, 2005, it included Tarzan's Treehouse built on Tarzan's Island. Rafts near Festival of the Lion King are used to ferry passengers to and from the island, which is encircled by the Rivers of Adventure. This is a similar arrangement to Disneyland's Tom Sawyer Island.

== Gallery ==
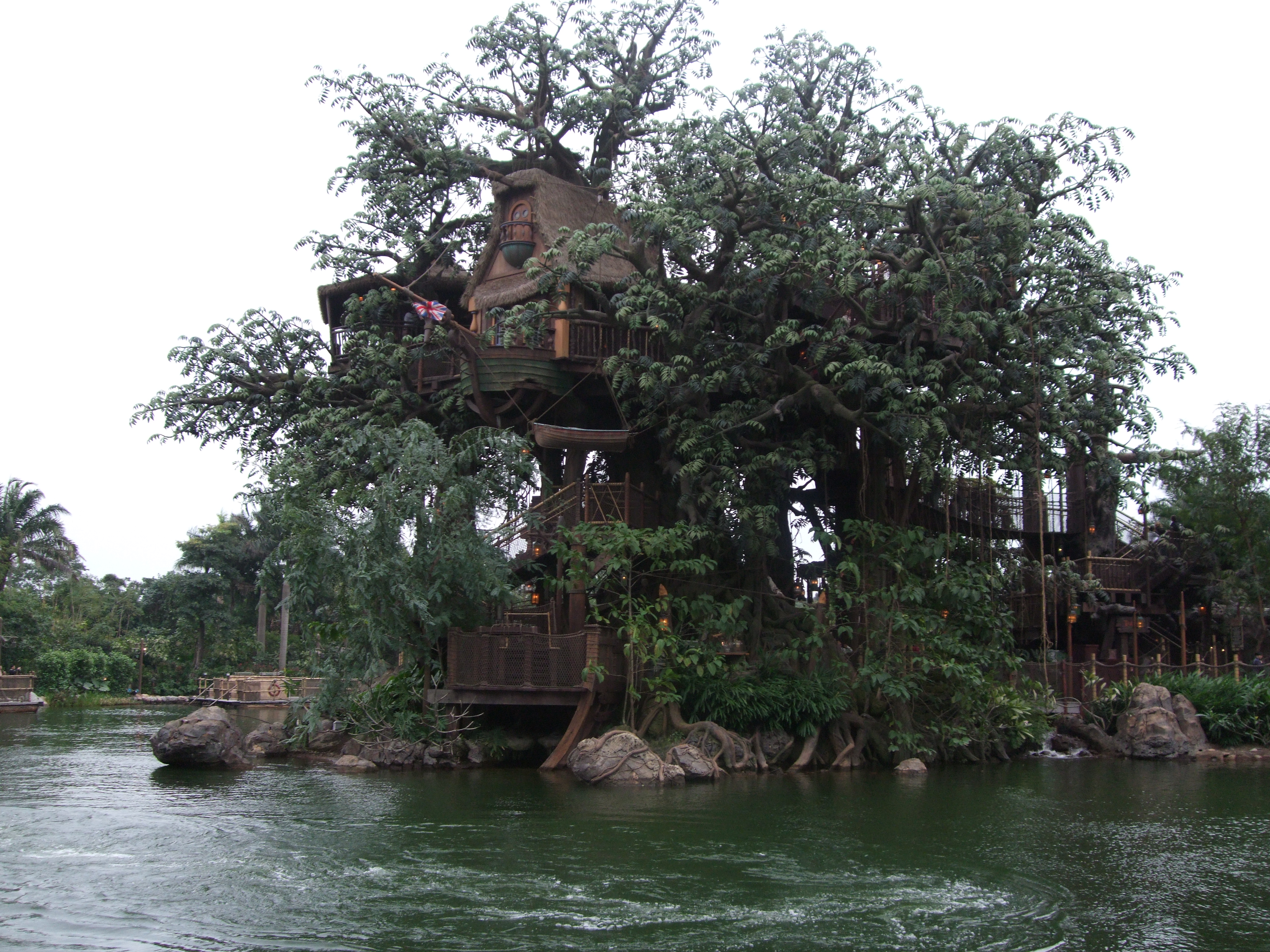
Tarzan's Treehouse at Hong Kong Disneyland

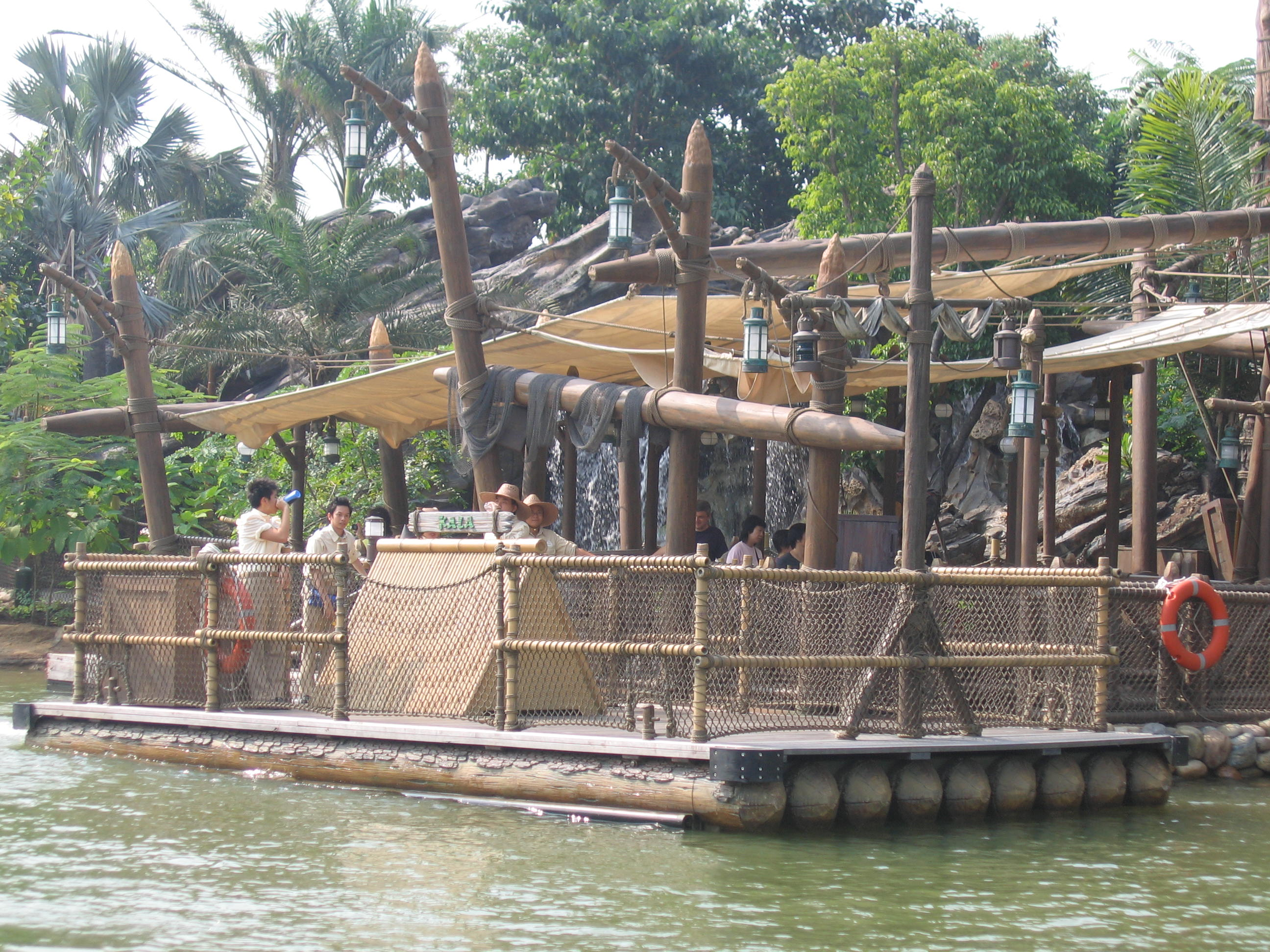
The raft to Tarzan's Treehouse
