= Jailbirds (1991 film) =

- Genre: Comedy
- Teleplay by: Craig Heller; Guy Shulman; Marcia Midkiff
- Story by: Marcia Midkiff
- Directed by: Burt Brinckerhoff
- Starring: Phylicia Rashad; Dyan Cannon; Dakin Matthews
- Theme music composer: Ken Harrison
- Country of origin: United States
- Original language: English

Production
- Executive producers: Aaron Spelling; E. Duke Vincent
- Producer: James L. Conway
- Cinematography: Gordon Lonsdale
- Editor: Bob Bring
- Running time: 102 minutes
- Production company: Spelling Entertainment

Original release
- Release: May 16, 1991

Jailbirds is a 1991 American TV movie directed by Burt Brinckerhoff.

== Plot ==
Two convicts, one white, one black, escape from prison while handcuffed together.

== Cast ==
- Phylicia Rashad as Janice Grant
- Dyan Cannon as Rosie Lacroix
- Dakin Matthews as Sheriff Dobbs
- David Knell as Deputy Baxter
- Ahmad Rashad as Larry Braddock
- Bethany Wright as Loretta
- Dennis Letts as Poppa
- T.E. Russell as Clemmons
- Clyde Kusatsu as Kasaki
- Maria Arita as Kelli
- Anne Haney as Haydee
- Ritch Brinkley as Beetle
