= Swiss Family Treehouse =

Walkthrough attraction at Disney parks

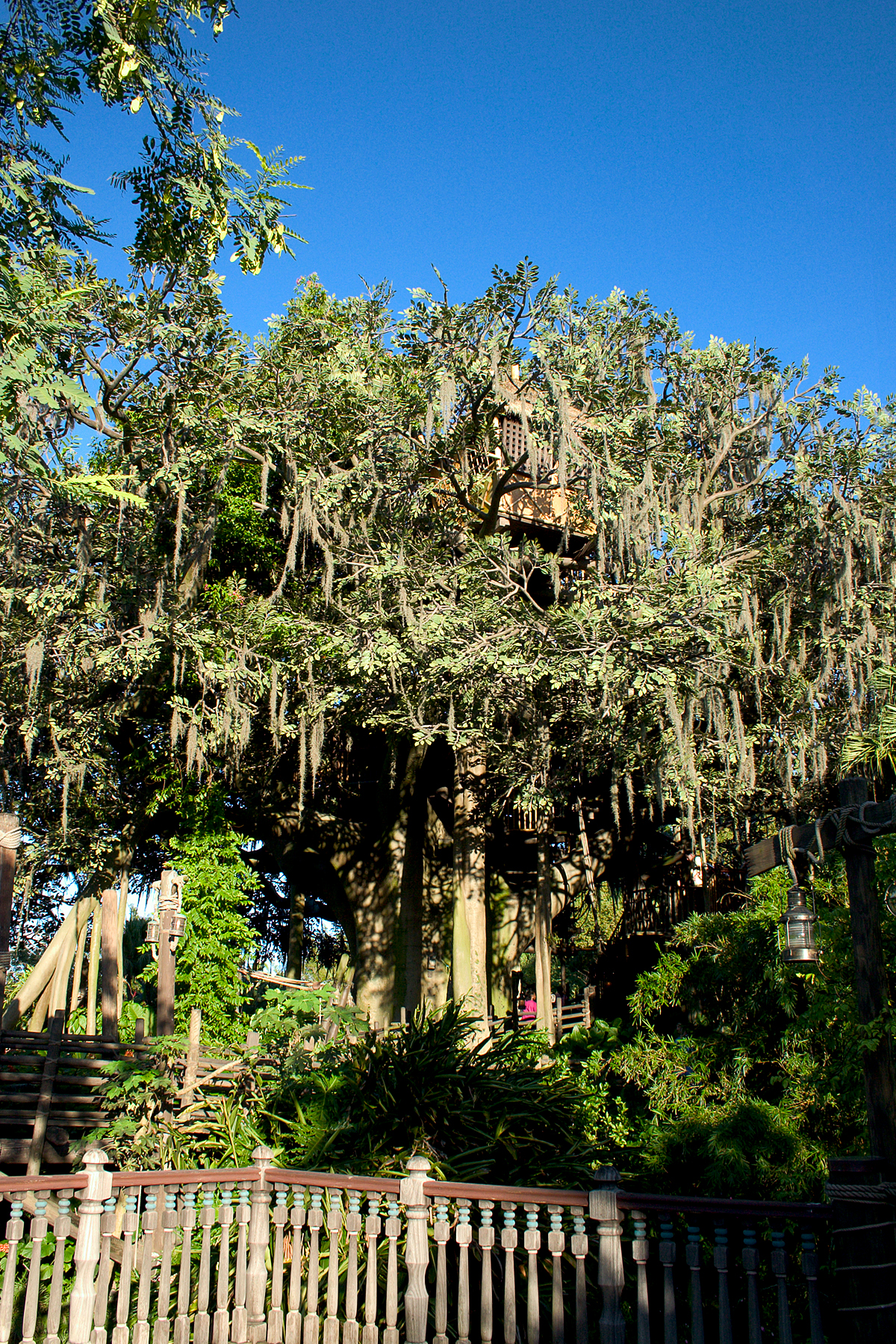
- Swiss Family Treehouse at the Magic Kingdom

Disneyland
- Area: Adventureland
- Status: Removed
- Opening date: November 18, 1962; 63 years ago
- Closing date: March 8, 1999; 27 years ago
- Replaced by: Tarzan's Treehouse (1999–2021); Adventureland Treehouse (2023–present)

Magic Kingdom
- Area: Adventureland
- Status: Operating
- Opening date: October 1, 1971; 54 years ago

Disneyland Park (Paris)
- Area: Adventureland
- Status: Operating
- Opening date: April 12, 1992; 34 years ago

Tokyo Disneyland
- Area: Adventureland
- Status: Removed
- Opening date: July 21, 1993; 33 years ago
- Closing date: April 1, 2022; 4 years ago

Ride statistics
- Designer: Walt Disney Imagineering
- Theme: Swiss Family Robinson

Swiss Family Treehouse is a walk-through attraction featured at Magic Kingdom, Disneyland Park (Paris). It was formerly located at Disneyland and Tokyo Disneyland. The attraction is centered on a large treehouse based on the 1960 Disney film Swiss Family Robinson.

== History ==
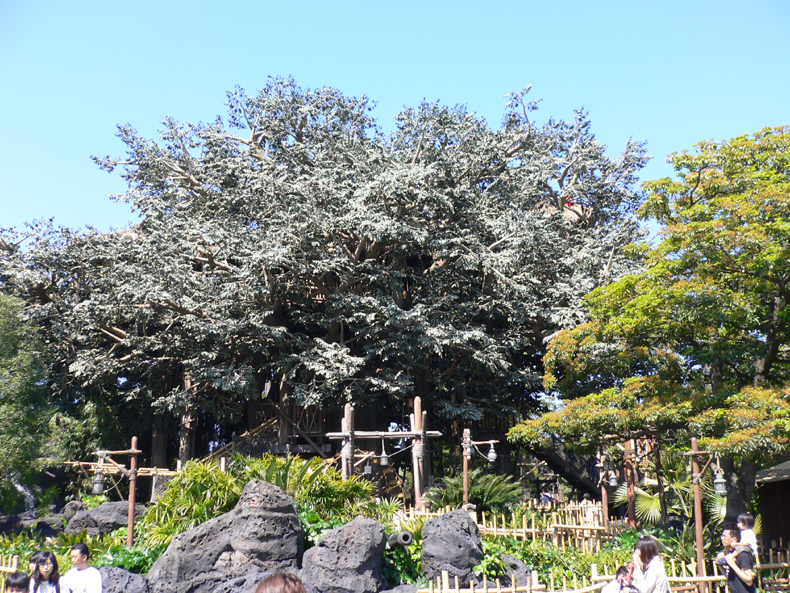
Tokyo Disneyland

The Swiss Family Treehouse opened November 18, 1962, in Adventureland at Disneyland, two years after the Disney film Swiss Family Robinson (1960). Imagineer Bill Martin worked out the treehouse's design; (Note: Martin was one of the original team gathered to create Disneyland, and the art director of Fantasyland.) Disney animator Wolfgang Reitherman, who designed the treehouse for the movie, contributed. At 70 feet (21 m) tall and 80 ft (24 m) wide, constructed of concrete and reinforced steel, the attraction weighed 150 short tons (140 t). The tree species was dubbed "Disneyodendron semperflorens grandis -- large, everblooming Disney tree."

John Mills, who played Father Robinson in the movie, and his daughter Hayley appeared at the attraction's opening. The attraction was a walk-through rather than a ride, in which visitors walked up 68 steps in the trunk of the tree through various "rooms" designed on the theme of the movie, with items and structures made to appear salvaged from a 19th-century shipwreck and desert island finds. When it opened, the attraction required a C ticket. The attraction originally opened with reddish brown leaves. However, the red leaves faded very easily in the sun and were eventually switched to green leaves sometime during the early 1960s.

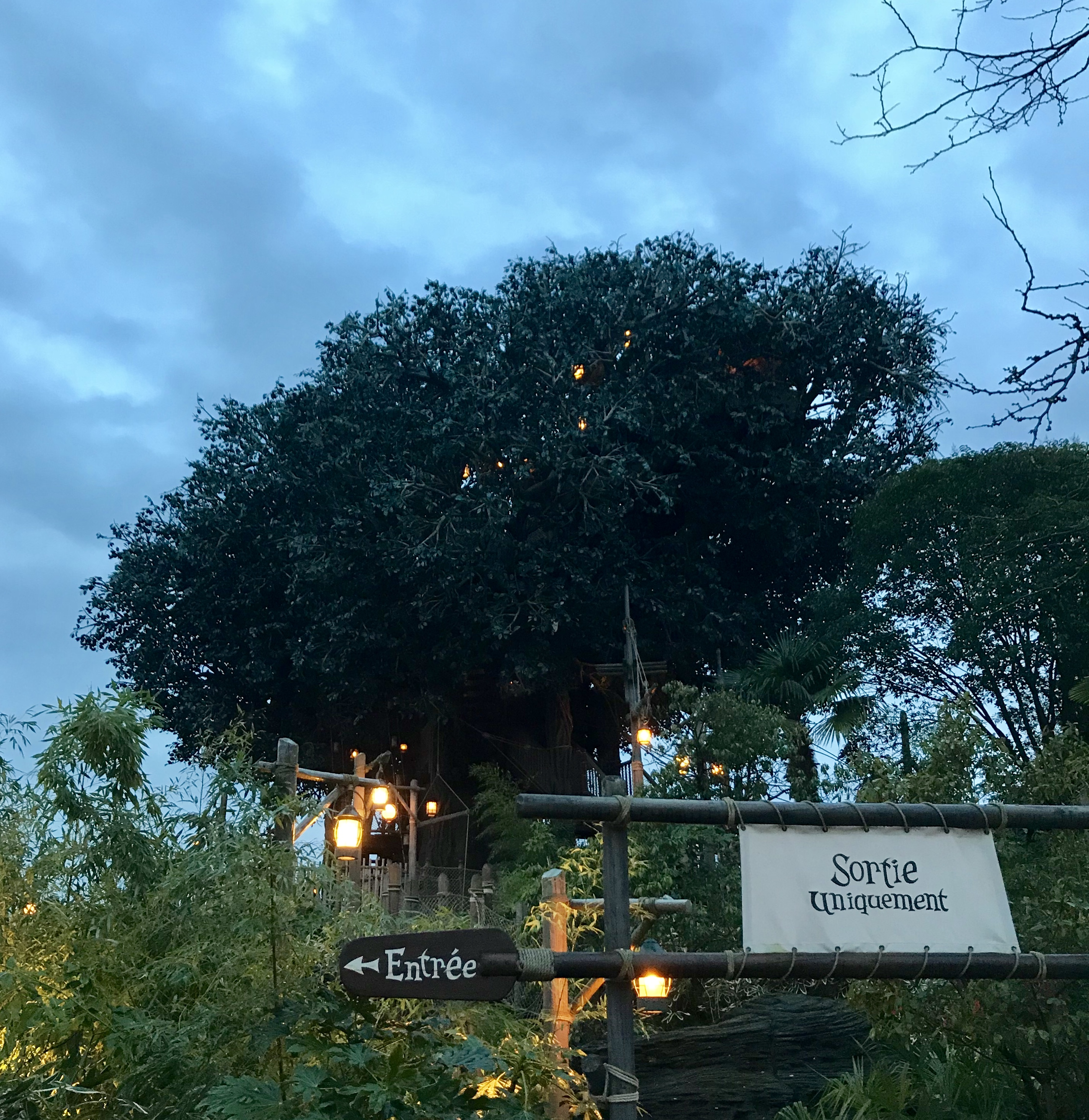
The Cabane des Robinson at Disneyland Park (Paris)

When the Magic Kingdom opened at Walt Disney World on October 1, 1971, the Swiss Family Treehouse was one of the original attractions of Adventureland. The tree, while intended to look real, is actually made up of steel, concrete, and stucco, stretching 60 feet (18 m) tall and 90 feet (27 m) wide. Similarly, when Euro Disneyland (now Disneyland Paris) opened on April 12, 1992, it featured a version of the attraction located in Adventureland, named La Cabane des Robinson. Tokyo Disneyland also has a Swiss Family Treehouse which opened in 1993, ten years after the park's debut.

In March 1999, the original attraction at Disneyland was closed due to issues with the main tree structure and former Disneyland president, Paul Pressler wanting to replace it with a gift shop. Despite this, it reopened in June of the same year as Tarzan's Treehouse, based on Disney Animation's 1999 film Tarzan. In September 2021, the attraction closed. In April 2022 it was confirmed that it would reopen with a different theme. It reopened as Adventureland Treehouse on November 10, 2023, which is inspired by Swiss Family Robinson.
