= Hollywood Women's Press Club =

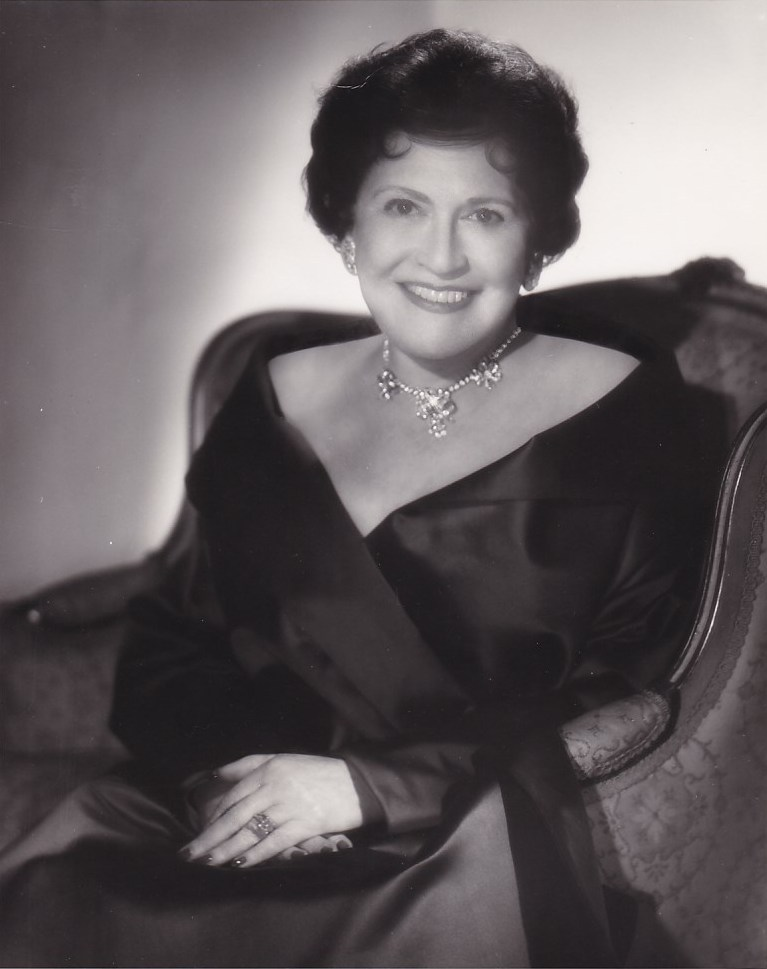
Louella Parsons

The Hollywood Women's Press Club was created in 1928 by Louella Parsons. The club was originally a luncheon club for women magazine and newspaper journalists, but in 1941 admitted publicists and subsequently screenwriters and other allied professions. The club admitted men from the late 1970s.

The club itself is well known mostly for its Golden Apple Awards, including the award for Sour Apple. The last awards were granted in 2001, and the Club is no longer active.
