= The Fox on the Fairway =

- Original language: English
- Written by: Ken Ludwig
- Genre: Comedy, farce
- Setting: The Tap Room of the Quail Valley Country Club. This year.

Premiere
- Date: October 19, 2010
- Place: Signature Theatre, Arlington, Virginia

The Fox on the Fairway is a comedy by Ken Ludwig that premiered at the Signature Theatre, Arlington, Virginia, in 2010. It concerns the goings-on at a private country club.

== Plot summary ==
Following the Tony-nominated revival of Lend Me a Tenor on Broadway, Ken Ludwig's new play, A Fox on the Fairway, debuted at the Signature Theatre in Washington, D.C., on October 19, 2010. A tribute to the great English farces of the 1930s and 1940s, A Fox on the Fairway pulls the rug out from underneath the stuffy denizens of a private country club. Filled with mistaken identities, slamming doors, and over-the-top romantic shenanigans, it is a furiously paced comedy that recalls the Marx Brothers' classics.

== Productions and reviews ==
The play premiered at the Signature Theatre, Arlington, Virginia, in October 2010. Directed by John Rando, the cast featured Jeff McCarthy, Holly Twyford and Andrew Long. The play was described by the Washington Post critic Peter Marks as "Ludwig's tribute to the great English farces of the 1930s and 1940s". Peter Marks found the plot mechanical and the play too full of "shamelessly recycled sex, sports and alcohol jokes." Paul Harris called it "a manic race to the intellectual depths propelled by a nonsensical tale of greed, love and stupidity."

The second production was presented at the George Street Playhouse, New Brunswick, New Jersey, running from March 22, 2011 (previews) to April 22. Directed by David Saint, the cast featured Amy Hohn, Michael Mastro, Peter Scolari, Mary Testa, Reggie Gowland and Lisa McCormick. This production received a more positive reaction by the critics. Michael Summers found "plenty of bright spots", although he also bemoaned a mechanical plot. Peter Filichia described it as "phenomenally funny" and thought it better than Ludwig's Lend Me a Tenor.

The third production was mounted in March, 2012 at Gulfshore Playhouse in Naples, Florida. Chris Silk in the Naples Daily News said, "Gulfshore Playhouse knocked one straight off the tee and hit a hole in one Friday. Farce 'The Fox on the Fairway,' which mixes golf, romance and fashion keeps the audience in stitches. Pitching wedges, drivers, putters and nine irons – golf was never so much fun."

A production was mounted in May 2012 at The Aurora Theatre, a professional theatre in Lawrenceville, Georgia. Bert Osborne in the Atlanta Journal-Constitution said, "Aurora’s 'Fairway' stays the course most amusingly"
