= Isabelle de Montolieu =

Swiss novelist and translator

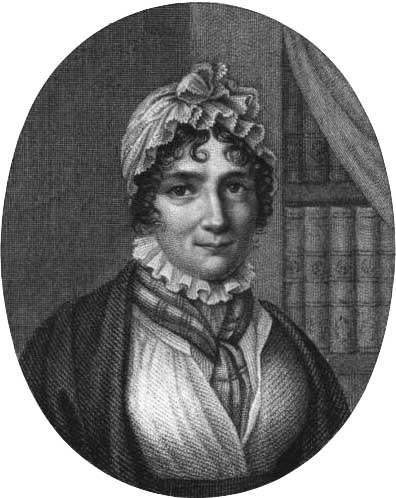
Portrait of Isabelle de Montolieu (1751–1832)

Isabelle de Montolieu (1751–1832) was a Swiss novelist and translator. She wrote in and translated to the French language. Montolieu penned a few original novels and over 100 volumes of translations. She wrote the first French translation of Jane Austen's Sense and Sensibility (Raison et Sensibilité, ou Les Deux Manières d'Aimer) and Persuasion (La Famille Elliot, ou L'Ancienne Inclination).

One of her translations to French, Johann David Wyss's German-language The Swiss Family Robinson (Le Robinson suisse, ou, Journal d'un père de famille, naufragé avec ses enfans), was adapted and expanded by her with original episodes more than once. Montolieu's French version is the literal source of still frequently reprinted English translations; for example William H. G. Kingston's 1879 version, one of the most popular in English over the years, is actually a translation of Montolieu's French adaptation.

Her first novel, Caroline de Lichtfield, ou Mémoires d'une Famille Prussienne, was an influential instant best-seller in the 1780s and stayed in print until the mid-19th century.
