= The Swiss Family Robinson =

1812 novel by Johann David Wyss

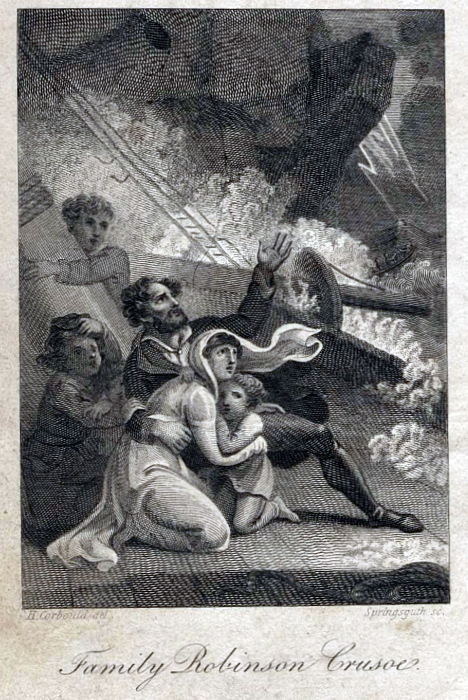
- Frontispiece to the first English translation of The Swiss Family Robinson, 1816
- Author: Johann David Wyss
- Original title: Der Schweizerische Robinson
- Translator: William Godwin and Mary Jane Clairmont; William Henry Giles Kingston
- Illustrator: Johann Emmanuel Wyss
- Language: German
- Genre: Adventure fiction Robinsonade
- Set in: East Indies, early 19th century
- Publisher: Orell Füssli
- Publication date: 1812 (1st volume); 1813 (2nd volume); 1826 (3rd volume); 1827 (4th volume)
- Publication place: Switzerland
- Media type: Print (Hardcover and paperback)
- Pages: 333 + 407 + 395 + 448
- Dewey Decimal: 833.6
- LC Class: PZ7.W996 S
- Text: The Swiss Family Robinson at Wikisource

The Swiss Family Robinson (German: Der Schweizerische Robinson, "The Swiss Robinson") is a novel by the Swiss author Johann David Wyss, first published in 1812, about a Swiss family of immigrants whose ship en route to Port Jackson, Australia goes off course and is shipwrecked in the East Indies. The ship's crew is lost, but the family and several domestic animals survive. They make their way to shore, where they build a settlement, undergoing several adventures before being rescued; some refuse rescue and remain on the island.

The book is the most successful of a large number of "Robinsonade" novels that were written in response to the success of Daniel Defoe's Robinson Crusoe (1719). It has gone through a large number of versions and adaptations.

== History ==
Written by Swiss writer Johann David Wyss, edited by his son Johann Rudolf Wyss, and illustrated by another son, Johann Emmanuel Wyss, the novel was intended to teach his four sons about family values, good farming, the uses of the natural world, and self-reliance. Wyss's attitude toward its education is in line with the teachings of Jean-Jacques Rousseau, and many chapters involve Christian-oriented moral lessons such as frugality, husbandry, acceptance, and cooperation.

Wyss presents adventures as lessons in natural history and physical science. This resembles other educational books for young ones published about the same time. These include Charlotte Turner Smith's Rural Walks: in Dialogues intended for the use of Young Persons (1795), Rambles Farther: A continuation of Rural Walks (1796), and A Natural History of Birds, intended chiefly for young persons (1807). But Wyss's novel is also modeled after Daniel Defoe's Robinson Crusoe, an adventure story about a shipwrecked sailor first published in 1719.

The book presents a geographically impossible array of large mammals and plants that probably could never have existed together on a single island, for the children's education, nourishment, clothing, and convenience.

The first edition was published in two volumes in Zurich in 1812 and 1813 by Orell Füssli under the full title: Der Schweizerische Robinson oder der schiffbrüchige Schweizer-Prediger und seine Familie. The second volume lacked a proper ending, concluding with the father wondering if they would ever meet another human. A postscript reported that an English ship later found them but left with only their journal. The second edition, in which the original author was no longer mentioned, appeared in 1821, followed by two continuation volumes in 1826 and 1827. The continuation introduced a shipwrecked English girl, rescued by one of the boys; he returns to England with her, while the family stays, and the island becomes the colony of “New Switzerland.”

An 1814 French adaptation by Isabelle de Montolieu and 1824 continuation (from chapter 37), Le Robinson suisse, ou, Journal d'un père de famille, naufragé avec ses enfants, added further adventures of Fritz, Ernest, Jack, and Franz.

The first English edition was published in 1814 by Juvenile Library in two volumes as The Family Robinson Crusoe, or, Journal of a Father Shipwrecked, with his Wife and Children, on an Uninhabited Island. The translation is attributed to William Godwin and was published by his wife, Mary Jane Clairmont; however, the authorship of the translation has been questioned. The translation is described as “from the German of M. Wiss,” although it includes some of Montolieu’s additions. This edition was republished in an expanded form in 1816, Public Domain at archive.org, also reprinted by Penguin Classics. The better-known title The Swiss Family Robinson was used for the first time in 1818.

Since then, there have been many versions of the story with episodes added, changed, or deleted. Perhaps the best-known English version is by William H. G. Kingston, first published in 1879. It is translated from the German "with the omission of the long sententious lectures found in the original." Despite this claim, other sources indicate that this edition is based on Montolieu’s 1816 version. Around the same year, an abridged version of 112 pages by "I. F. M." was published, which told the story entirely in words of only one syllable (excepting some proper nouns, e.g. Robinson).

Other English editions that claim to include the whole of the Wyss-Montolieu narrative are by W. H. Davenport Adams (1869–1910) and Mrs. H. B. Paull (1879). As Carpenter and Prichard write in The Oxford Companion to Children's Literature (Oxford, 1995), "with all the expansions and contractions over the past two centuries (this includes a long history of abridgments, condensations, Christianizing, and Disney products), Wyss's original narrative has long since been obscured."

Although movie and television adaptations typically name the family "Robinson", it is not a Swiss name. The German title translates as The Swiss Robinson which identifies the novel as part of the Robinsonade genre, rather than a story about a family named Robinson.

== Plot ==
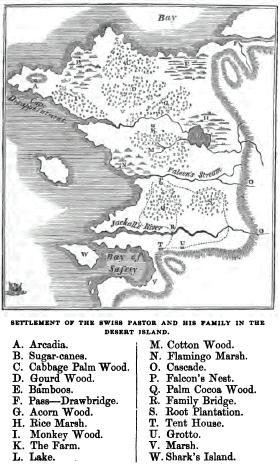
The Map of "New Switzerland"

The novel opens with a Swiss family in the hold of a sailing ship, weathering a great storm. The ship's crew evacuates without them, so William, Elizabeth, and their four sons (Fritz, Ernest, Jack, and Francis) are left to survive alone. As the ship tosses about, William prays that God will spare them.

The ship survives the night, and the family finds itself within sight of a tropical desert island. The following day, they decide to get to the island they can see beyond the reef. With much effort, they construct a vessel out of tubs. After they fill the tubs with food, ammunition, and other items of value they can safely carry, they row toward the island. Two dogs from the ship, Turk and Juno, swim beside them. The ship's cargo of livestock (including a cow, a donkey, two goats, six sheep, a ram, a pig, chickens, ducks, geese, and pigeons), guns and powder, carpentry tools, books, a disassembled pinnace and provisions have survived.

Upon reaching the island, the family set up a makeshift camp. William knows that they must prepare for a long time on the island and his thoughts are as much on provisions for the future as on their immediate wants. William and his oldest son Fritz spend the next day exploring the island which contains an assortment of animals found in other countries.

The family spends the next few days securing themselves against hunger. William and Fritz make several trips to the ship to bring everything useful from the vessel ashore where Fritz manages to slay a shark. The domesticated animals on the ship are towed back to the island. There is also a great store of firearms and ammunition, hammocks for sleeping, carpenter's tools, lumber, cooking utensils, silverware, and dishes. Initially, they construct a treehouse. As time passes and after Elizabeth is injured climbing the stairs down from it, they settle in a more permanent dwelling in part of a cave. Fritz rescues a young Englishwoman named Jenny Montrose, who was shipwrecked elsewhere on their island.

The book covers more than ten years. William and the older boys explore various environments and develop homes and gardens at various sites about the island. Ultimately, the father wonders if they will ever see the rest of humanity again. Eventually, a British ship that is in search of Jenny Montrose anchors near the island and is discovered by the family. The captain is given the journal containing the story of their life on the island, which is eventually published. Several family members continue to live tranquilly on their island, while several return to Europe with the British.

== Characters ==
The principal characters of the book (including Isabelle de Montolieu's adaptations and continuation) are:

- William (unnamed in the original) – The patriarch of the family. He is the narrator of the story and leads the family. He knows an enormous amount of information on almost everything the family comes across, demonstrating bravery and self-reliance. The German text calls him a Schweizer-Prediger (Swiss preacher), but this detail is absent from English and French translations.
- Elizabeth (unnamed in the original) – The loving mother of the family. She is intelligent and resourceful, arming herself even before leaving the ship with a "magic bag" filled with supplies, including sewing materials and seeds for food crops. She is also a remarkably versatile cook, taking on anything from porcupine soup to roast penguins.
- Fritz – The oldest of the four boys, he is 15. Fritz is intelligent but impetuous. He is the strongest and accompanies his father on many quests.
- Ernest (German: Ernst) – The second oldest of the boys is 13. Ernest is the most intelligent, but a less physically active boy, often described by his father as "indolent". Like Fritz, however, he comes to be an excellent shot.
- Jakob "Jack" – The third oldest of the boys, 11 years old. He is thoughtless, bold, energetic, and the quickest in the group.
- Francis (German: Franz) - The youngest of the boys, he is eight years old when the story opens. He usually stays home with his mother.
- Jenny Montrose (also called Emily in some editions) - A young English girl who is shipwrecked on the island and comes to live with the family. Her character was introduced in the 1826 and 1827 continuations.

In the novel, the family is not called "Robinson" as their surname is not mentioned; the intention of the title is to compare them to Robinson Crusoe. However, in 1900, Jules Verne published The Castaways of the Flag (alternatively known as Second Fatherland), where he revisits the original shipwreck. In this sequel, of the family's final years on the original island, the family is called Zermatt (which is, as "Robinson", not a Swiss name – however, "Zermatten" is).

=== Pets ===
- Turk (German: Türk) – The family's English dog.
- Juno (German: Bill) – The family's Danish dog.
- Grizzle - The family's donkey that is swallowed by a boa constrictor.
- Beauty and Grace - Two bullfrogs that become pets of the family.
- Nip (also called Knips or Nips in some editions; called Knips in the German) – An orphan monkey adopted by the family after their dogs Turk and Juno have killed his mother. The family uses him to do taste-testing on poisonous fruits.
- Fangs (German: Zähne) – A jackal that is tamed by the family.
- Hurricane - An ostrich that is tamed by the family and serves as a mode of transportation.
- Lightfoot - An onager that is tamed by the family. She has a foal named Swift.
- Parrot - An unnamed parrot that was mentioned to be the family's companion.
- Storm - An unspecified buffalo that is tamed by the family to pull heavy items.

== Other adaptations ==
The novels, in one form or another, have also been adapted numerous times, sometimes changing location and time period:

=== Book sequels ===
- Le Robinson suisse, ou, Journal d'un père de famille, naufragé avec ses enfants (1824) by Isabelle de Montolieu, new edition of the novel with further adventures.
- Willis the Pilot: a sequel to The Swiss family Robinson; or, Adventures of an emigrant family wrecked on an unknown coast of the Pacific Ocean (1858) has been attributed to Johann Wyss or to Johanna Spyri, author of Heidi.
- Second Fatherland (Seconde patrie, 1900), by Jules Verne takes up the story at the point where Wyss's tale left off. It was first published in English in two volumes, Their Island Home and Castaways of the Flag, and later in a single volume as Castaways of the Flag.
- Return to Robinson Island (2015), by T. J. Hoisington, based on the original 1812 Swiss Family Robinson novel.

=== Audio adaptations ===
In 1963, the novel was dramatized by the Tale Spinners for Children series (United Artists Records UAC 11059) performed by the Famous Theatre Company.

=== Film versions ===
- Perils of the Wild (1925 serial film)
- Swiss Family Robinson (1940 film)
- Swiss Cheese Family Robinson (Mighty Mouse short, 1947)
- Swiss Family Robinson (1960 Walt Disney live-action film)
- Lost in Space (1998, inspired by the 1965–1968 American TV series which was inspired by the book)

=== Made-for-TV movies ===
- Swiss Family Robinson: Lost in the Jungle (1957) — Unaired pilot for a hypothetical series, released in DVD only in 2000.
- Swiss Family Robinson (1958) — Starring Laraine Day, Walter Pidgeon, Dennis Hopper and Patty Duke.
- The Swiss Family Robinson (1973) – Animated adaptation.
- The Swiss Family Robinson (1975) — Pilot to the American series of the same year.
- Beverly Hills Family Robinson (1998)
- The New Swiss Family Robinson (1998) — Starring Jane Seymour, James Keach and David Carradine.
- Stranded (2002)

=== Television series ===
- English Family Robinson (1957) — British series, believed to be lost.
- Lost in Space (1965–1968) — A science fiction adaptation in which the Robinsons are a family of explorers whose spacecraft goes off course.
- Festival of Family Classics: "Swiss Family Robinson" (1973) — Episode 14 of the Rankin/Bass animated series.
- Swiss Family Robinson (1974) — Canadian series starring Chris Wiggins.
- The Swiss Family Robinson (1975) — American series starring Martin Milner.
- The Swiss Family Robinson: Flone of the Mysterious Island (1981) — A Japanese anime series.
- The Jetsons: "The Swiss Family Jetson" (1986) — Episode 22 of the second season of the Hanna-Barbera animated series, modeled after Johann Wyss's book.
- The Adventures of Swiss Family Robinson (1998) — New Zealand series starring Richard Thomas.
- Lost in Space (2018–2021) — A Netflix adaptation of the 1965 Lost in Space.
- Swiss Family Robinson (TBA) — A Disney+ adaptation currently in development.

=== Direct-to-video films ===
- Swiss Family Robinson (1996)

=== Comic book series ===
- Swiss Family Robinson (1947) — Classics Illustrated adaptation of the original novel
- Space Family Robinson (1962–1984) — science fiction adaptation
- Swiss Family Mouse n' Sons (c. 1962) — straight adaptation with the Disney characters playing the roles

=== Stage adaptations ===
- Swiss Family Robinson written by Jerry Montoya and performed at B Street Theatre in Sacramento, California, in 2009.

=== Video game ===
- Swiss Family Robinson by Tom Snyder Productions for the Apple II and Commodore 64, published in 1984 under the Windham Classics label. The player takes the role of Fritz, the eldest brother.

=== Parody ===
- The New Swiss Family Robinson by Owen Wister (1882). Harvard Lampoon

== See also ==
- The Admirable Crichton
- Cast Away
- The Coral Island
- Lost in Space
- Masterman Ready, or the Wreck of the Pacific
- Robinson Crusoe
