= Swiss Psalm =

National anthem of Switzerland

Schweizerpsalm; Cantique suisse; Salmo svizzero; Psalm svizzer
English: Swiss Psalm
- German sheet music
- National anthem of Switzerland
- Also known as: "Trittst im Morgenrot daher..." (English: "Appearing at Dawn...")
- Lyrics: Leonhard Widmer (German); Charles Chatelanat (French); Camillo Valsangiacomo (Italian); Flurin Camathias (Romansch), 1840
- Music: Alberich Zwyssig, 1835, 1841
- Adopted: 1961
- Readopted: 1981
- Preceded by: "Rufst du, mein Vaterland"

Audio sample
- "Swiss Psalm" Instrumental: file; help

The Swiss Psalm (German: Schweizerpsalm [ˈʃvaɪtsərˌpsalm]; (Note: Also known by the opening line "Trittst im Morgenrot daher...".) French: Cantique suisse [kɑ̃tik sɥis]; Italian: Salmo svizzero [ˈsalmo ˈzvittsero]; Romansh: Psalm Svizzer [ˈ(p)salm ˈʒviːtser]) is the national anthem of Switzerland.

It was composed in 1841, by Alberich Zwyssig (1808–1854). Since then, it has been frequently sung at patriotic events. The Federal Council declined, however, on numerous occasions to accept the psalm as the official Swiss national anthem. This was because the council wanted the people to express their say on what they wanted as a national anthem. From 1961 to 1981, it provisionally replaced "Rufst du, mein Vaterland" ("When You Call, My Country"; French "Ô monts indépendants"; Italian "Ci chiami o patria", Romansh "E clomas, tger paeis"), the anthem by Johann Rudolf Wyss (1743–1818) that was set to the melody of "God Save the King". On 1 April 1981, the Swiss Psalm was declared the official Swiss national anthem.

In 2014, the Schweizerische Gemeinnützige Gesellschaft organized a public competition and unofficial vote to change the lyrics of the national anthem.

== History ==
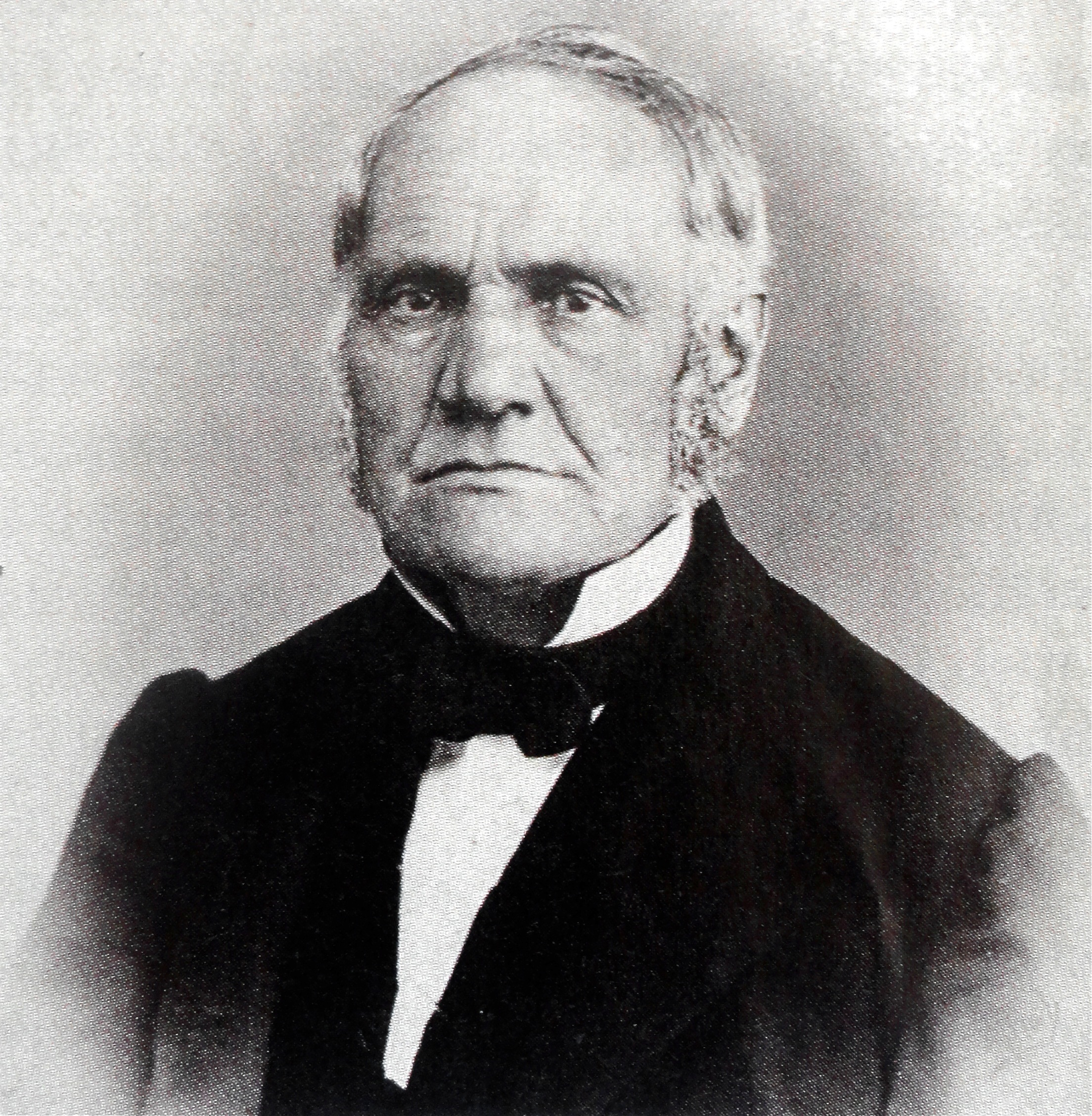
Leonhard Widmer, whose 1840 poem formed the basis of the anthem

The German-language patriotic song "Rufst du, mein Vaterland" (French "Ô monts indépendants", Italian "Ci chiami o patria", Romansh "E clomas, tger paeis"), composed in 1811 by Johann Rudolf Wyss (1743–1818), was used as the de facto national anthem from about 1850. The setting of the hymn to the British tune of "God Save the King" led to confusing situations when both countries' anthems were played. Therefore, it was replaced with another tune in 1961.

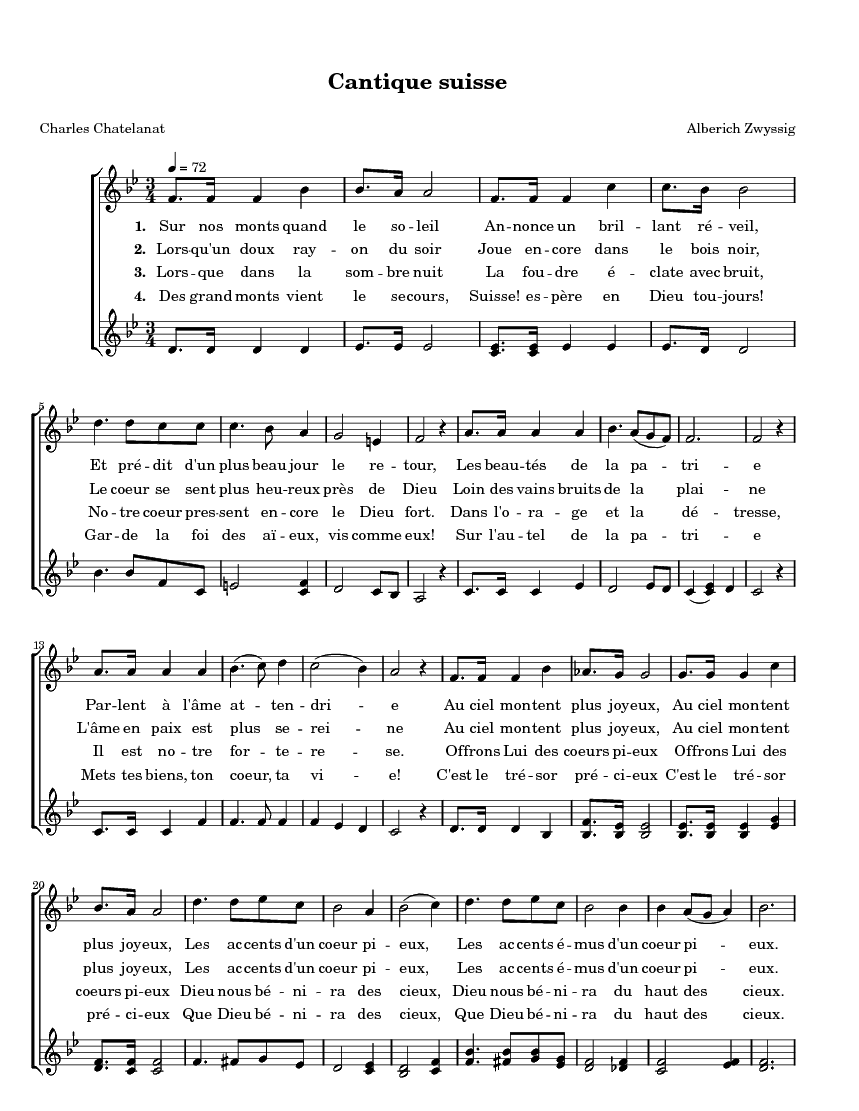
French sheet music

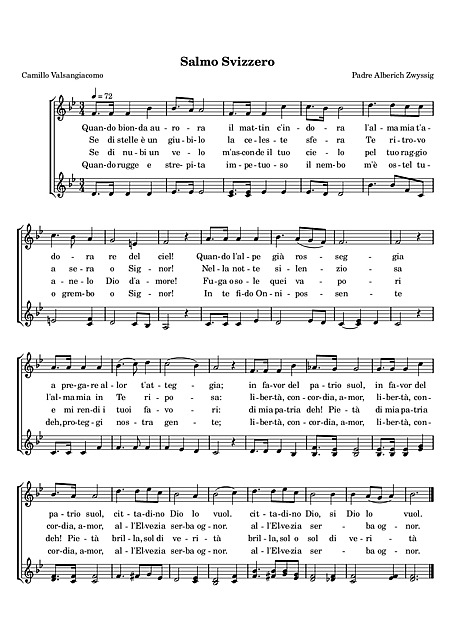
Italian sheet music

The Swiss Psalm was composed in 1841 by Alberich Zwyssig (1808–1854). Zwyssig used a tune he had composed in 1835 and slightly altered the words of a poem written in 1840 by Leonhard Widmer (1809–1867).

In the second half of the 19th century, the song became popular and was frequently sung at patriotic celebrations. Between 1894 and 1953, there were repeated suggestions for it to be adopted as official national anthem. In this, it was in competition with "Rufst du, mein Vaterland", a patriotic song that was widely seen as the de facto national anthem but was never given official status.

The Swiss Psalm temporarily became the national anthem in 1961. After a trial period of three years, the Swiss tune was adopted indefinitely in 1965. The statute could not be challenged until ten years later but did not totally exclude the possibility of an ultimate change. A competition was set up in 1979 to search for a successor to the anthem. Despite many submissions, none of the others seemed to express the Swiss sentiment. The Swiss anthem finally got its definitive statutory status in April 1981, the Federal Council maintaining that it was purely a Swiss song suitably dignified and solemn. The popularity of the song has not been established. At least, it has been shown with several vox pops taken that many people do not know it at all, and only a small percentage can recite it all.

In 1986, "Roulez tambours!" ("Roll the drums!") by Henri-Frédéric Amiel was proposed by the Swiss National Alliance.

In the late 1990s the Fondation Pro CH 98 tried to promote a new anthem composed by the Argovian Christian Daniel Jakob.

In 2014, the Société suisse d'utilité publique started a public competition to find new lyrics for the national anthem. The instruction was to take inspiration from the preamble of the Federal Constitution of Switzerland. The jury received 208 proposals; it selected six of them and translated them in the four national languages of Switzerland. In March 2015, the six selected proposals were released on-line (with videos in four languages) and opened to public vote (until May 2015). The top three vote-getters were selected for a second on-line ballot between June and August. In September 2015, a televised final selected one set of lyrics. Finally, the Société suisse d'utilité publique will propose the winning lyrics to the federal authorities. As soon as the new hymn text is known enough, the Swiss Parliament and the electorate will be asked to determine it. As of 2017, the new lyrics have not been officially adopted. A version of the winning lyrics was also made by combining the four national languages of Switzerland. As 500,000 Swiss abroad and residents in Switzerland are native English speakers, the new hymn text has been translated not only into the four official Swiss languages but also into English. More information and the scores of the hymn can be found at: .

== Lyrics ==
1938 instrumental
1938 orchestral version (one stanza)

1961 instrumental
Instrumental rendition by the Swiss Army Central Band, 1961 (one stanza)

U.S. Navy Band version
Instrumental rendition by the United States Navy Band, circa 1995 (one stanza)

MIDI version
2022 MIDI version

German vocal
Official German vocal, 2014

French vocal
Official French vocal, 2014

Italian vocal
Official Italian vocal, 2014

Romansh vocal
Official Romansh vocal, 2014

Because Switzerland has four national languages, the lyrics of the original German song were adapted into the other three national languages: French, Italian and Romansh.

German original

I
Trittst im Morgenrot daher,
Seh’ ich dich im Strahlenmeer,
Dich, du Hocherhabener, Herrlicher!
Wenn der Alpenfirn sich rötet,
Betet, freie Schweizer, betet,
𝄆 Eure fromme Seele ahnt... 𝄇
Gott im hehren Vaterland!
Gott, den Herrn im hehren Vaterland!

II
Kommst im Abendglühn daher,
Find ich dich im Sternenheer,
Dich, du Menschenfreundlicher, Liebender!
In des Himmels lichten Räumen
Kann ich froh und selig träumen;
𝄆 Denn die fromme Seele ahnt 𝄇
Gott im hehren Vaterland!
Gott, den Herrn, im hehren Vaterland!

III
Ziehst im Nebelflor daher,
Such ich dich im Wolkenmeer,
Dich, du Unergründlicher, Ewiger!
Aus dem grauen Luftgebilde
Bricht die Sonne klar und milde,
𝄆 Und die fromme Seele ahnt 𝄇
Gott im hehren Vaterland!
Gott, den Herrn, im hehren Vaterland!

IV
Fährst im wilden Sturm daher,
Bist du selbst uns Hort und Wehr,
Du, allmächtig Waltender, Rettender!
In Gewitternacht und Grauen
Lasst uns kindlich ihm vertrauen!
𝄆 Ja, die fromme Seele ahnt 𝄇
Gott im hehren Vaterland!
Gott, den Herrn, im hehren Vaterland!

French lyrics

I
Sur nos monts, quand le soleil
Annonce un brillant réveil,
Et prédit d'un plus beau jour le retour,
Les beautés de la patrie
Parlent à l'âme attendrie;
𝄆 Au ciel montent plus joyeux 𝄇
Les accents d'un cœur pieux,
Les accents émus d'un cœur pieux.

II
Lorsqu'un doux rayon du soir
Joue encore dans le bois noir,
Le cœur se sent plus heureux près de Dieu
Loin des vain bruits de la plaine
L'âme en paix est plus sereine;
𝄆 Au ciel montent plus joyeux, 𝄇
Les accents d'un cœur pieux,
Les accents émus d'un cœur pieux.

III
Lorsque dans la sombre nuit
La foudre éclate avec bruit,
Notre cœur pressent encore le Dieu fort.
Dans l'orage et la détresse,
Il est notre forteresse.
𝄆 Offrons-lui de cœurs pieux 𝄇
Dieu nous bénira des cieux,
Dieu nous bénira du haut des cieux.

IV
Des grand monts vient le secours,
Suisse! espère en Dieu toujours!
Garde la foi des aïeux, vis comme eux!
Sur l'autel de la patrie
Met tes biens, ton cœur, ta vie!
𝄆 C'est le trésor précieux 𝄇
Que Dieu nous bénira des cieux,
Que Dieu nous bénira du haut des cieux.

Italian lyrics

I
Quando bionda aurora
il mattin c'indora
l'alma mia t'adora re del ciel!
Quando l'alpe già rosseggia
a pregare allor t'atteggia;
𝄆 in favor del patrio suol, 𝄇
cittadino Dio lo vuol,
cittadino Dio, si Dio lo vuol.

II
Se di stelle è un giubilo
la celeste sfera
Te ritrovo a sera o Signor!
Nella notte silenziosa
l'alma mia in Te riposa:
𝄆 libertà, concordia, amor, 𝄇
𝄆 all'Elvezia serba ognor. 𝄇

III
Se di nubi un velo
m'asconde il tuo cielo
pel tuo raggio anelo Dio d'amore!
Fuga o sole quei vapori
e mi rendi i tuoi favori:
𝄆 di mia patria deh! Pietà 𝄇
brilla, o sol di verità,
brilla sol, o sol di verità!

IV
Quando rugge e strepita
impetuoso il nembo
m'è ostel tuo grembo o Signor!
In te fido Onnipossente
deh, proteggi nostra gente;
𝄆 Libertà, concordia, amor, 𝄇
𝄆 all'Elvezia serba ognor. 𝄇

Romansh lyrics

I
En l'aurora la damaun
ta salida il carstgaun,
spiert etern dominatur, Tutpussent!
Cur ch'ils munts straglischan sura,
ura liber Svizzer, ura.
𝄆 Mia olma senta ferm, 𝄇
𝄆 Dieu en tschiel, il bab etern. 𝄇

II
Er la saira en splendur
da las stailas en l'azur
tai chattain nus, creatur, Tutpussent!
Cur ch'il firmament sclerescha
en noss cors fidanza crescha.
𝄆 Mia olma senta ferm, 𝄇
𝄆 Dieu en tschiel, il bab etern. 𝄇

III
Ti a nus es er preschent
en il stgir dal firmament,
ti inperscrutabel spiert, Tutpussent!
Tschiel e terra t'obedeschan
vents e nivels secundeschan.
𝄆 Mia olma senta ferm, 𝄇
𝄆 Dieu en tschiel, il bab etern. 𝄇
IV
Cur la furia da l'orcan
fa tremblar il cor uman
alur das ti a nus vigur, Tutpussent!
Ed en temporal sgarschaivel
stas ti franc a nus fidaivel.
𝄆 Mia olma senta ferm, 𝄇
𝄆 Dieu en tschiel, Il bab etern. 𝄇

=== English translations ===
German lyrics

I
You come along in the dawn,
I see you in the sea of rays,
You, you exalted, glorious one!
When the Alpine snow turns red,
Pray, free Swiss, pray,
𝄆 Your pious soul suspects... 𝄇
God in the noble fatherland!
God the Lord in the noble fatherland!

II
You come along in the evening glow,
I find you in the starry army,
You, you philanthropist, lover!
In the bright spaces of heaven
Can I dream happily and happily;
𝄆 For the pious soul suspects 𝄇
God in the noble fatherland!
God the Lord in the noble fatherland!

III
You move along in the mist,
I'm looking for you in the sea of clouds,
You, you unfathomable, eternal one!
From the gray air structure
The sun breaks clear and mild,
𝄆 And the pious soul suspects 𝄇
God in the noble fatherland!
God the Lord in the noble fatherland!

IV
You drive along in a wild storm,
You yourself are our refuge and defense,
You, all-powerful ruler, savior!
In thunderstorm night and horror
Let us childlike trust in him!
𝄆 Yes, the pious soul suspects 𝄇
God in the noble fatherland!
God the Lord in the noble fatherland!

French lyrics

I
On our mountains, when the sun
Announces a bright awakening,
And predicted the return of a prettier day,
The homeland's beauties
Speak to the tender soul;
𝄆 To heaven, rise more joyfully, 𝄇
The accents of a pious heart,
The moved accents of a pious heart.

II
When a gentle evening ray of sunshine
Still plays in the black wood,
The heart feels happier with God,
Far from the vain sounds of the plain
A soul at peace is more serene,
𝄆 To heaven, rise more joyfully, 𝄇
The accents of a pious heart,
The moved accents of a pious heart.

III
When in the dark night
Lightning erupts with noise,
Our heart still feels God's strength
Through storm and distress,
He is our fortress.
𝄆 Let us offer him our pious hearts, 𝄇
God will bless us from the heavens,
God will bless us from the top of the heavens.

IV
From the great mountains comes help,
Switzerland! Always trust in God!
Keep your ancestors' faith, live like they did
On the homeland's altar,
Place your belongings, your heart, your life!
𝄆 This is the precious treasure, 𝄇
God will bless us from the heavens,
God will bless us from the top of the heavens.

Italian lyrics

I
When, with the blond aurora
the morning makes us bright
my soul adores thee, king of the skies!
When the alp is already turning red
it directs you to pray;
𝄆 in favour of the fatherland, 𝄇
Citizen! God wants it.
Citizen! God, yes, God, wants it.

II
If, made up of stars, a jubilation
is the celestial sphere
I find thee in the evening, O Lord!
In the silent night
my soul rests in thee:
𝄆 freedom, harmony, love, 𝄇
𝄆 for Helvetia it always keeps. 𝄇

III
If a veil of clouds
hides your sky from me
for your ray I yearn, God of love!
Flee, O sun, those vapors
and give me back thy favors:
of my country, oh! Have mercy
on my country, oh! Mercy
𝄆 shines, oh sun of truth! 𝄇

IV
When the storm roars and thunders
the impetuous storm
is my shelter, oh Lord!
In thee, faithful Almighty
ah, protect our people;
𝄆 Freedom, harmony, love, 𝄇
𝄆 for Helvetia always. 𝄇

Romansh lyrics

I
In the dawn of the morning
the earthly being rises,
eternal spirit, ruler, Almighty!
When the mountains shine above,
now free Swiss, now.
𝄆 My soul feels strong, 𝄇
𝄆 God in heaven, the eternal Father. 𝄇

II
Also in the evening in splendor
of the stars in the azure
we find you, Creator, Almighty!
When the firmament brightens
in our hearts faith grows.
𝄆 My soul feels strong, 𝄇
𝄆 God in heaven, the eternal Father. 𝄇

III
You are also present to us
in the darkness of the firmament,
you unfathomable spirit, Almighty!
Heaven and earth obey you,
winds and snowflakes follow you.
𝄆 My soul feels strong, 𝄇
𝄆 God in heaven, the eternal Father. 𝄇

IV
When the fury of the hurricane
makes the human heart tremble
then give us strength, Almighty!
And in the dreadful storm
you stay true to us trustworthy.
𝄆 My soul feels strong, 𝄇
𝄆 God in heaven, the eternal Father. 𝄇

=== IPA transcriptions ===
German IPA (Note: See Help:IPA/German, German phonology and Swiss German.)

[trɪt͡st ɪm ˈmɔrɡn̩ˌroːt daˈheːr]
[seː ɪç dɪç ɪm ˈʃtraːlən meːr]
[dɪç duː ˈhoːx ɛrˈhaːbn̩ər ˈhɛrlɪçər]
[vɛn deːr ˈalpn̩fɪrn sɪç ˈrøːtət]
[ˈbeːtət ˈfraɪ̯ɛ ˈʃvaɪ̯t͡sər ˈbeːtət]
[ˈɔʏ̯rɛ ˈfrɔmɛ ˈseːlɛ aːnt]
[ˈɔʏ̯rɛ ˈfrɔmɛ ˈseːlɛ aːnt]
[ɡɔt ɪm ˈheːrən ˈfaːtərˌland]
[ɡɔt dɛn hɛrn ɪm ˈheːrən ˈfaːtərˌland]

[kɔmst ɪm ˈaːbn̩dˌɡlyːn daˈheːr]
[fɪnt ɪç dɪç ɪm ˈʃtɛrnənheːr]
[dɪç duː ˈmɛnʃn̩ˌfrɔʏ̯ndlɪçˌheːr ˈliːbn̩dər]
[ɪn dɛs ˈhɪml̩s ˈlɪçtn̩ ˈrɔʏ̯mən]
[kan ɪç froː ʊnd ˈseːlɪç ˈtrɔʏ̯mən]
𝄆 [dɛn diː ˈfrɔmɛ ˈseːlɛ aːnt] 𝄇
[ɡɔt ɪm ˈheːrən ˈfaːtərˌland]
[ɡɔt dɛn hɛrn ɪm ˈheːrən ˈfaːtərˌland]

[t͡siːst ɪm ˈneːbl̩floːr daˈheːr]
[suːx ɪç dɪç ɪm ˈvɔlkn̩ˌmeːr]
[dɪç duː ʊnɛrˈɡrʏndlɪçər ˈeːvɪɡər]
[aʊ̯s dɛm ˈɡraʊ̯ən ˈlʊftɡəˌbɪldə]
[brɪçt diː ˈsɔnɛ klaːr ʊnd ˈmɪldə]
𝄆 [ʊnd diː ˈfrɔmɛ ˈseːlɛ aːnt] 𝄇
[ɡɔt ɪm ˈheːrən ˈfaːtərˌland]
[ɡɔt dɛn hɛrn ɪm ˈheːrən ˈfaːtərˌland]

[fɛːrst ɪm ˈvɪldn̩ ʃtʊrm daˈheːr]
[bɪst duː sɛlpst ʊns hɔrt ʊnd veːr]
[duː alˈmɛçtɪç ˈvaltn̩dər ˈrɛtn̩dər]
[ɪn ɡəˈvɪtərˌnaxt ʊnd ˈɡraʊ̯ən]
[last ʊns ˈkɪndlɪç ɪm fɛrˈtraʊ̯ən]
𝄆 [jaː diː ˈfrɔmɛ ˈseːlɛ aːnt] 𝄇
[ɡɔt ɪm ˈheːrən ˈfaːtərˌland]
[ɡɔt dɛn hɛrn ɪm ˈheːrən ˈfaːtərˌland]

French IPA (Note: See Help:IPA/French, French phonology and Swiss French.)

[syʁ no mɔ̃ kɑ̃ lə sɔ.lɛj]
[a.nɔ̃s œ̃ bʁi.jɑ̃ ʁe.vɛj]
[ˈet pʁe.di d‿œ̃ ply bo ʒuʁ lə ʁə.tuʁ]
[le bo.te də la pa.tʁi(ə)]
[paʁl a l‿am a.tɑ̃.dʁi(ə)]
[o sjɛl mɔ̃.t(ə) ply ʒwa.jø]
[o sjɛl mɔ̃.t(ə) ply ʒwa.jø]
[le ak.sɑ̃ d‿œ̃ kœʁ pjø]
[le ak.sɑ̃ e.my d‿œ̃ kœʁ pjø]

[lɔʁ.sk‿œ̃ du ʁɛ.jɔ̃ dy swaʁ]
[ʒu ɑ̃.kɔʁ dɑ̃ lə bwa nwaʁ]
[lə kœʁ sə sɑ̃ ply œ.ʁø pʁɛ də djø]
[lwɛ̃ de vɛ̃ bʁɥi d(ə) la plɛn]
[l‿am ɑ̃ pɛ ɛ ply s(ə).ʁɛn]
[o sjɛl mɔ̃.t(ə) ply ʒwa.jø]
[o sjɛl mɔ̃.t(ə) ply ʒwa.jø]
[le ak.sɑ̃ d‿œ̃ kœʁ pjø]
[le ak.sɑ̃ e.my d‿œ̃ kœʁ pjø]

[lɔʁ.sk(ə) dɑ̃ la sɔ̃.bʁə nɥi]
[la fudʁ e.klat a.vɛk bʁɥi]
[nɔ.tʁə kœʁ pʁɛ.sɑ̃ ɑ̃.kɔʁ lə djø fɔʁ]
[dɑ̃ l‿ɔ.ʁaʒ e la de.tʁɛs]
[il ɛ nɔ.tʁə fɔʁ.tə.ʁɛs]
[ɔ.fʁɔ̃.lɥi d(ə) kœʁ pjø]
[ɔ.fʁɔ̃.lɥi d(ə) kœʁ pjø]
[djø nu be.ni.ʁa de sjø]
[djø nu be.ni.ʁa dy o de sjø]

[de ɡʁɑ̃ mɔ̃ vjɑ̃ lə s(ə).kuʁ]
[sɥis ɛs.pɛʁ ɑ̃ djø tu.ʒuʁ]
[ɡaʁ.d(ə) la fwa de a.jø vi kɔm ø]
[syʁ l‿o.tɛl də la pa.tʁi]
[mɛ te bjɛ̃ tɔ̃ kœʁ ta vi]
[s‿ɛ lə tʁe.zɔʁ pʁe.sjø]
[s‿ɛ lə tʁe.zɔʁ pʁe.sjø]
[kə djø nu be.ni.ʁa de sjø]
[kə djø nu be.ni.ʁa dy o de sjø]

Italian IPA (Note: See Help:IPA/Italian, Italian phonology and Swiss Italian.)

[ˈkwan.do ˈbjon.d(a)‿au̯ˈrɔːra]
[il matˈtin t͡ʃinˈdɔːra]
[ˈlal.ma ˈmiːa taˈdɔːra ˈrɛ del ˈt͡ʃel]
[ˈkwan.do ˈlal.pe ˈd͡ʒa rosˈsed.d͡ʒa]
[a preˈɡaːre alˈlor tatˈted.d͡ʒa]
[iɱ faˈvor del ˈpaːtrjo ˈswɔl]
[iɱ faˈvor del ˈpaːtrjo ˈswɔl]
[t͡ʃit.taˈdiːno ˈdiːo lo ˈvwɔl]
[t͡ʃit.taˈdiːno ˈdiːo si ˈdiːo lo ˈvwɔl]
