= Variations on "America" =

1892 organ composition by Charles Ives

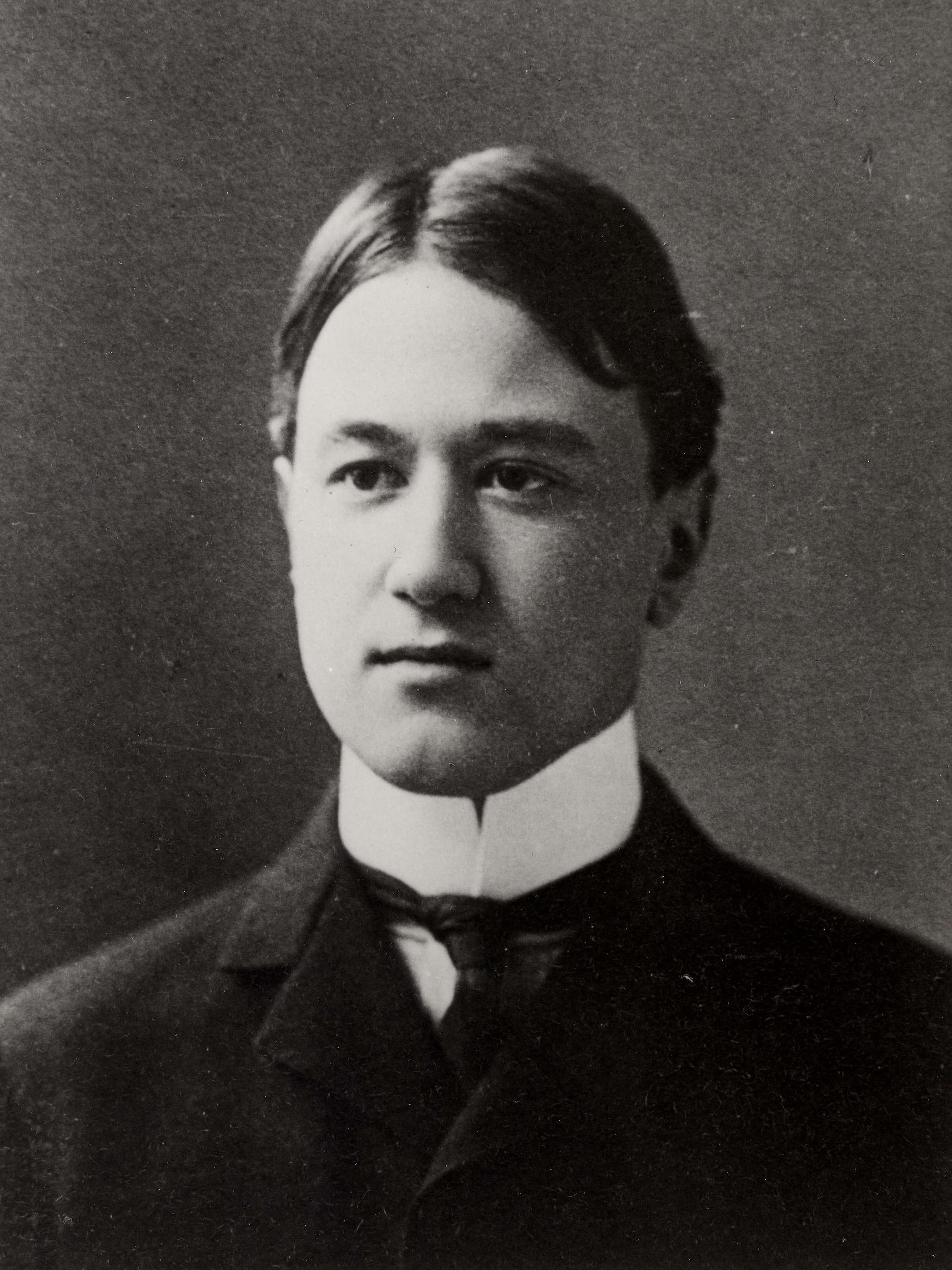
Charles Ives' graduation portrait from Yale University, c. June 1898

Variations on "America" is a composition for organ by the American composer Charles Ives first performed in 1892 for an Independence Day celebration.

== Composition ==
Composed in 1891 when Ives was seventeen, it is an arrangement of a traditional tune, known as "America (My Country, 'Tis of Thee)" (words by Samuel Francis Smith), and was at the time the de facto anthem of the United States. The tune is also widely recognised in Thomas Arne's orchestration as the British National Anthem, "God Save the King", and in the former anthems of Russia ("The Prayer of Russians", from 1816 to 1833), Switzerland ("Rufst du, mein Vaterland", until 1961), and Germany ("Heil dir im Siegerkranz", from 1871 to 1918), as well as being the current national anthem of Liechtenstein ("Oben am jungen Rhein") and the royal anthem of Norway, "Kongesangen".

Ives prepared it for a Fourth of July celebration in 1892 at the Methodist church where he was organist in Brewster, New York. He performed it for the first time on February 17, 1892, and made revisions to the work until 1894. Although the piece is considered challenging even by modern concert organists, he spoke of playing the pedal work in the final variation as being "almost as much fun as playing baseball".

It went unpublished until 1949, when the organist E. Power Biggs rediscovered it, and prepared an edition for publication. He incorporated it into his repertoire, and it became a regularly performed piece by American organists. In 1962 it was orchestrated by William Schuman, and premiered in this version by the New York Philharmonic under Andre Kostelanetz in 1964. The Schuman orchestration formed the basis of a wind band version by William E. Rhoads, published in 1968.

== Structure ==
The variations are as follows:

1. Introduction and Theme
2. Variation I
3. Variation II
4. Interlude I
5. Variation III
6. Variation IV
7. Interlude II
8. Variation V
9. Coda

The interludes are Ives' first notated use of bitonality: the first combines F major for the right hand and D♭ major for the left hand and pedals, whilst the second combines A♭ major and F major.

Ives' biographer Jan Swafford notes that whilst it might be tempting to hear Variations on "America" as a satire, the probability is that Ives meant the work as a sincere exercise in variations for organ. He adds that whilst Ives was capable of musical jokes, they are usually considerably broader than here. Ives was not deaf to its comic potential however: he later noted that his father "didn't let me do it much, as it made the boys laugh" in church.

== Notable recordings ==
=== Organ ===
- E. Power Biggs – E. Power Biggs' Greatest Hits (1969), CBS
- Gerd Zacher – Between Organ and Barrel Organ (1970), Wergo
- Virgil Fox – The Entertainer (1974), RCA
- George C. Baker – Organ Works of American Composers (1976), Solstice Music
- Simon Preston – Variations on America: Organ Spectacular (1990), Argo
- Aaron Robinson – Symphonic Dances (2008), MAI
- Arturo Sacchetti – Organ Music in America (2008), ARTS

=== Schuman orchestration ===
- Morton Gould & Chicago Symphony Orchestra – Charles Ives: Symphony No. 1 (1966), RCA Victor
- Eugene Ormandy & Philadelphia Orchestra – Charles Ives: Symphony No. 1 (1968), Columbia
- Zubin Mehta & Los Angeles Philharmonic – The Fourth of July! (1976), London Records
- Arthur Fiedler & Boston Pops – Fiedler Encores (1978), Decca
- Leonard Slatkin & St. Louis Symphony Orchestra – The American Album (1991), Victor
- José Serebrier & Bournemouth Symphony Orchestra – William Schuman: Violin Concerto (2001), Naxos
- Kurt Masur & New York Philharmonic – Brahms / Reger / Ives (2006), TELDEC
