= Johann David Wyss =

Writer of the Swiss Family Robinson (1743–1818)

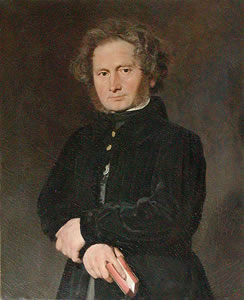
- Born: 28 May 1743; Bern, Old Swiss Confederacy
- Died: 11 January 1818 (aged 74); Bern, Swiss Confederation
- Occupation: Author
- Children: Johann Rudolf Wyss (son)
- Writing career
- Notable work: The Swiss Family Robinson (1812)

Johann David Wyss (German: [ˈjoːhan ˈdaːvɪt ˈviːs]; 28 May 1743 – 11 January 1818) was a Swiss author, best remembered for his book The Swiss Family Robinson (Der schweizerische Robinson) (1812).

== Life ==
He was born and died in Bern. It is said that he was inspired by Daniel Defoe's Robinson Crusoe, but wanted to write a story from which his own children would learn, as the father in the story taught important lessons to his children. The Swiss Family Robinson was first published in German in 1812, then translated into English two years later. The book was edited by his son, Johann Rudolf Wyss, a scholar known for writing the Swiss national anthem, Rufst du, mein Vaterland. Another of Wyss's sons, Johann Emmanuel Wyss, illustrated the book. Johann David Wyss died in 1818 at the age of 74.

=== Style ===
Wyss has been described as an author whose style was "firmly Christian and moral in tone". There are also many underlying tones of Christianity throughout the book, particularly with regard to many of the characters and their moral philosophies.

== Influence ==
Jules Verne reportedly declared that The Swiss Family Robinson was one of his favorite books, so much so that he was inspired to write a sequel, The Castaways of the Flag (1900), nearly a century after Wyss's death.
