= My Country, 'Tis of Thee =

American patriotic song

My Country, 'tis of Thee
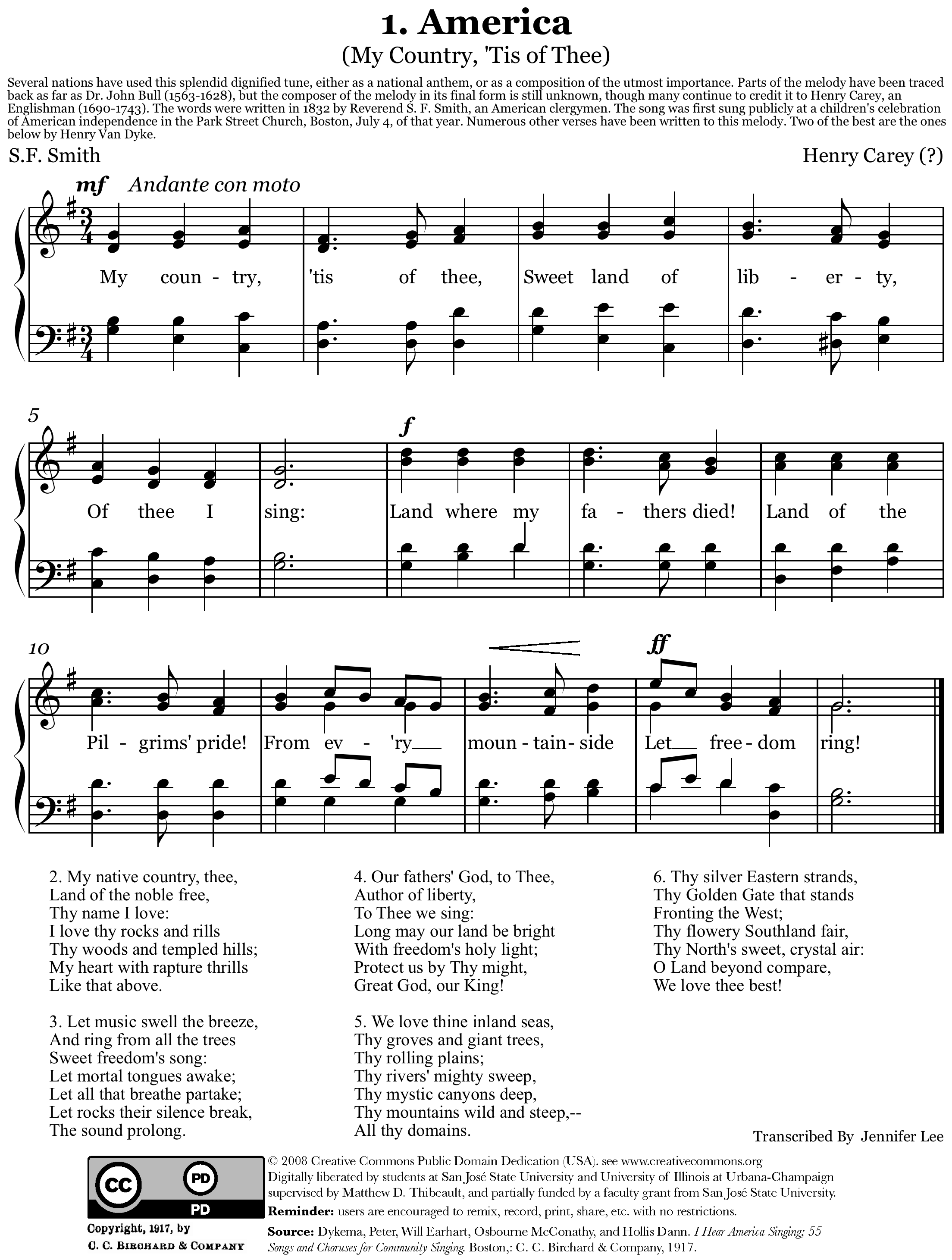
- Sheet music
- Unofficial national anthem of the United States of America
- Also known as: "America"
- Lyrics: Samuel Francis Smith, 1831
- Music: Composer unknown; derived from “God Save the King”
- Published: 1832 by Charles Bradlee
- Adopted: July 4, 1831 (de facto)
- Relinquished: March 3, 1931
- Succeeded by: "The Star Spangled Banner"

Audio sample
- Vocalists with concert band accompaniment, United States Air Force Heritage of America Band, 2002: file; help

"My Country, 'Tis of Thee", also known as "America", is an American patriotic song whose lyrics were written by Samuel Francis Smith. The song served as one of the de facto national anthems of the United States (along with songs like "Hail, Columbia") before the adoption of "The Star-Spangled Banner" as the official U.S. national anthem in 1931. The melody is adapted from the de facto national anthem of the United Kingdom, "God Save the King".

== History ==
Samuel Francis Smith wrote the lyrics to "America" in 1831 while a student at the Andover Theological Seminary in Andover, Massachusetts. The use of the same melody as the British royal anthem is a contrafactum, for it reworks this symbol of British monarchy to make a statement about American democracy.

Composer Lowell Mason had requested that Smith translate or provide new lyrics for a collection of German songs, among them one written to this melody. Smith gave Mason the lyrics he had written, and the song was first performed in public on July 4, 1831, at a children's Independence Day celebration at Park Street Church in Boston. The first publication of "America" was in 1832.

== Lyrics ==
My country, 'tis of thee,
Sweet land of liberty,
Of thee I sing:
Land where my fathers died,
Land of the pilgrims' pride,
From every mountainside
Let freedom ring!

My native country, thee,
Land of the noble free,
Thy name I love;
I love thy rocks and rills,
Thy woods and templed hills;
My heart with rapture thrills
Like that above.

No more shall tyrants here
With haughty steps appear,
And soldier bands;
No more shall tyrants tread
Above the patriot dead—
No more our blood be shed
By alien hands.

Let music swell the breeze,
And ring from all the trees
Sweet freedom's song:
Let mortal tongues awake,
Let all that breathe partake;
Let rocks their silence break,
The sound prolong.

Our fathers’ God, to Thee,
Author of liberty,
To Thee we sing;
Long may our land be bright
With freedom’s holy light;
Protect us by Thy might,
Great God, our King.

An abolitionist version was written, by A. G. Duncan, 1843, with lyrics mentioning white and black races. For Washington's Centennial celebration, another verse was added to the original version.

== Notable performances ==
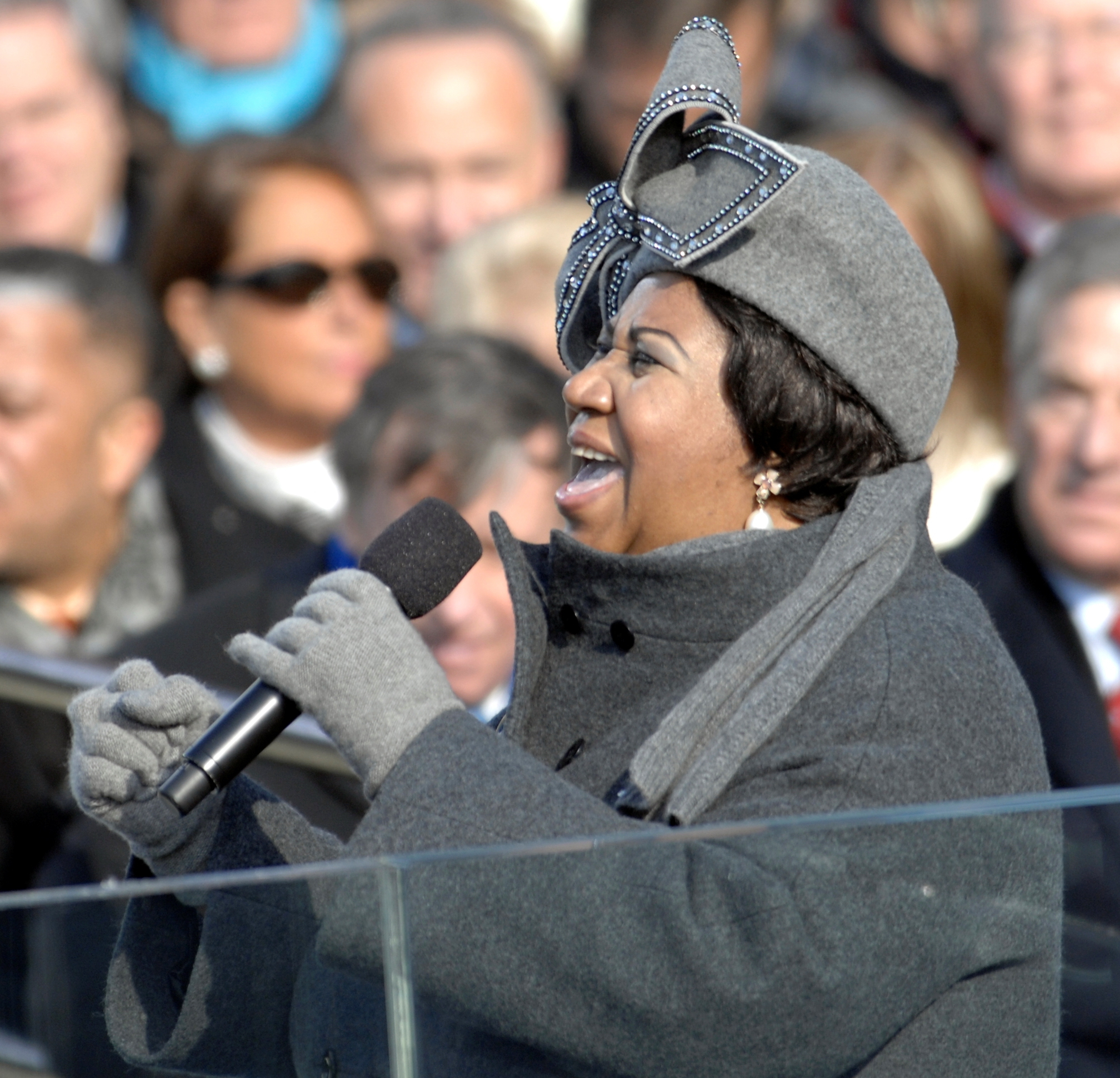
Aretha Franklin singing "My Country, 'Tis Of Thee" at the first inauguration of Barack Obama (January 20, 2009)

Marian Anderson performed the song at the Lincoln Memorial on Easter Sunday, April 9, 1939. Anderson, an African American singer, had been forbidden to perform at the DAR Constitution Hall due to its whites-only policy. After a national outcry, and with support from Eleanor Roosevelt, the concert was held on the steps of the memorial, and attracted a crowd of more than 75,000 in addition to a national radio audience of millions.

The 90-second newsreel report of Anderson's concert featuring "My Country, 'Tis of Thee," as distributed in 1939.

Martin Luther King Jr. recited the first verse of the song toward the end of his famous "I Have a Dream" speech at the Lincoln Memorial during the March on Washington for Jobs and Freedom on August 28, 1963.

On January 20, 2009, Aretha Franklin sang the song at the first inauguration of Barack Obama. Kelly Clarkson sang it at his second inauguration.

== See also ==
Other texts set to the same music:

- "Chom Rat Chong Charoen"
- "E Ola Ke Aliʻi Ke Akua"
- "Heil dir im Siegerkranz"
- "Heil unserm König, Heil!"
- "Gott segne Sachsenland"
- "Kongesangen"
- "Oben am jungen Rhein"
- "The Prayer of Russians"
- "Rufst du, mein Vaterland"

Organ variations by Charles Ives:

- Variations on "America"

== Bibliography ==
- Collins, Ace (2003). Songs Sung, Red, White, and Blue: The Stories Behind America's Best-Loved Patriotic Songs. HarperResource. ISBN 0060513047.
- Music, David M.; Richardson, Paul A. (2008). I Will Sing the Wondrous Story: A History of Baptist Hymnody in North America. Macon, Georgia: Mercer University Press. ISBN 978-0865549487.
