= God Save the King =

National anthem of the United Kingdom

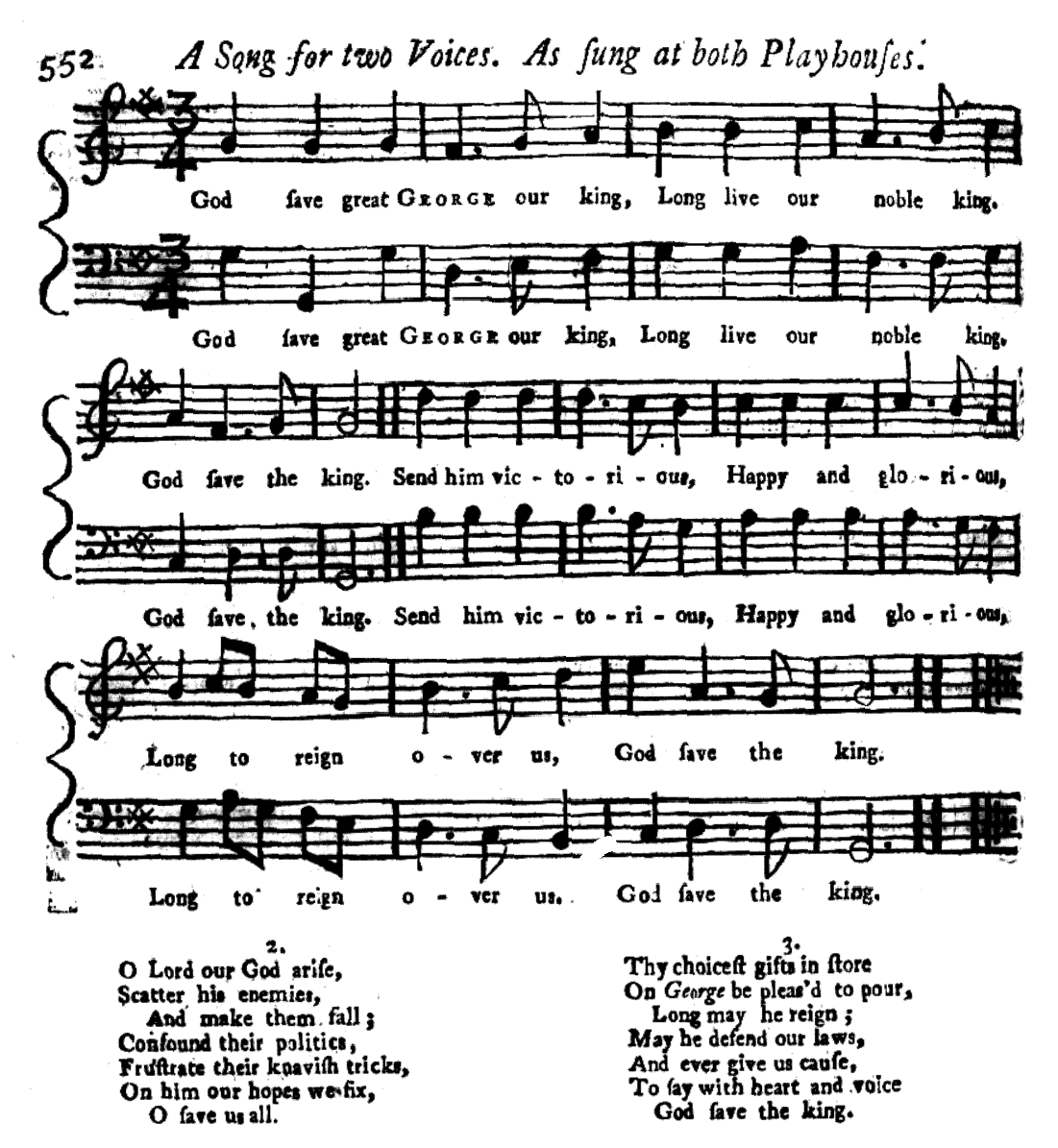
- Publication of an early version in The Gentleman's Magazine, October 1745. The title, on the contents page, is given as "God save our lord the king: A new song set for two voices".
- National and royal anthem of the United Kingdom and some other Commonwealth realms (Note: A national anthem of New Zealand and the royal anthem of Australia, The Bahamas, Belize, Canada, Grenada and Saint Vincent and the Grenadines)
- Also known as: "God Save the Queen" (when the monarch is female)
- Music: Composer unknown
- Adopted: September 28, 1745; 281 years ago (Kingdom of Great Britain)

Audio sample
- "God Save the King", performed by the United States Navy Band in B-flat major: file; help

"God Save the King" (known as "God Save the Queen" when the monarch is female) is the national anthem of the United Kingdom. It is one of the two national anthems of New Zealand and the royal anthem of the Isle of Man, Australia, Canada and some other Commonwealth realms. The author of the song is unknown and it may originate as a plainchant, but an attribution to the composer John Bull has sometimes been made.

Beyond its first verse, which is consistent, "God Save the King" has many historic and extant versions. Since its first publication, different verses have been added and taken away and, even today, different publications include various selections of verses in various orders. In general, only one verse is sung. Sometimes two verses are sung and, on certain occasions, three.

In countries not part of the British Empire, the tune of "God Save the King" has provided the basis for various patriotic songs, ones generally connected with royal ceremony. The melody is used for the national anthem of Liechtenstein, "Oben am jungen Rhein"; the royal anthem of Norway, "Kongesangen"; and the American patriotic song "My Country, 'Tis of Thee" (also known as "America"). The melody was also used for the national anthem "Heil dir im Siegerkranz" ("Hail to thee in the Victor's Crown") of the Kingdom of Prussia from 1795 until 1918; as the anthem of the German Emperor from 1871 to 1918; as "The Prayer of Russians", the imperial anthem of the Russian Empire, from 1816 to 1833; and as the national anthem of Switzerland, "Rufst du, mein Vaterland", from the 1840s until 1961.

== History ==
In The Oxford Companion to Music, Percy Scholes points out the similarities to an early plainsong melody, although the rhythm is very distinctly that of a galliard, and he gives examples of several such dance tunes that bear a striking resemblance to "God Save the King". Scholes quotes a keyboard piece by John Bull (1619) which has some similarities to the modern tune, depending on the placing of accidentals which at that time were unwritten in certain cases and left to the discretion of the player (see musica ficta). He also points to several pieces by Henry Purcell, one of which includes the opening notes of the modern tune, setting the words "God Save the King". Nineteenth-century scholars and commentators mention the widespread belief that an old Scots carol, "Remember O Thou Man", was the source of the tune.

The first published version that resembles the present song appeared in 1744, with no title but the heading "For two voices", in an anthology originally named Harmonia Britannia but changed after only a few copies had been printed to Thesaurus Musicus. When the Jacobite pretender Charles Edward Stuart led the 1745 rising, the song spread among those loyal to King George II. The tune published in The Gentleman's Magazine in 1745 departs from that used today at several points, one as early as the first bar, but is otherwise clearly a strong relative of the contemporary anthem. It was recorded as being sung in London theatres in 1745, with, for example, Thomas Arne writing a setting of the tune for the Drury Lane Theatre.

Scholes' analysis includes mention of "untenable" and "doubtful" claims, as well as "an American misattribution". Some of these are:

- James Oswald was a possible author of the Thesaurus Musicus, so may have played a part in the history of the song, but is not a strong enough candidate to be cited as the composer of the tune.
- Henry Carey: Scholes refutes this attribution: first on the grounds that Carey himself never made such a claim; second, when the claim was made by Carey's son (in 1795), it was in support of a request for a pension from the British Government; and third, the younger Carey claimed that his father, who died in 1743, had written parts of the song in 1745. It has also been claimed that the work was first publicly performed by Carey during a dinner in 1740 in honour of Admiral Edward Vernon, who had captured the Spanish harbour of Porto Bello (then in the Viceroyalty of New Granada, now in Panama) during the War of Jenkins' Ear.

Scholes recommends the attribution "traditional" or "traditional; earliest known version by John Bull (1562–1628)". The English Hymnal (musical editor Ralph Vaughan Williams) gives no attribution, stating merely "17th or 18th cent."

== Use in the United Kingdom ==
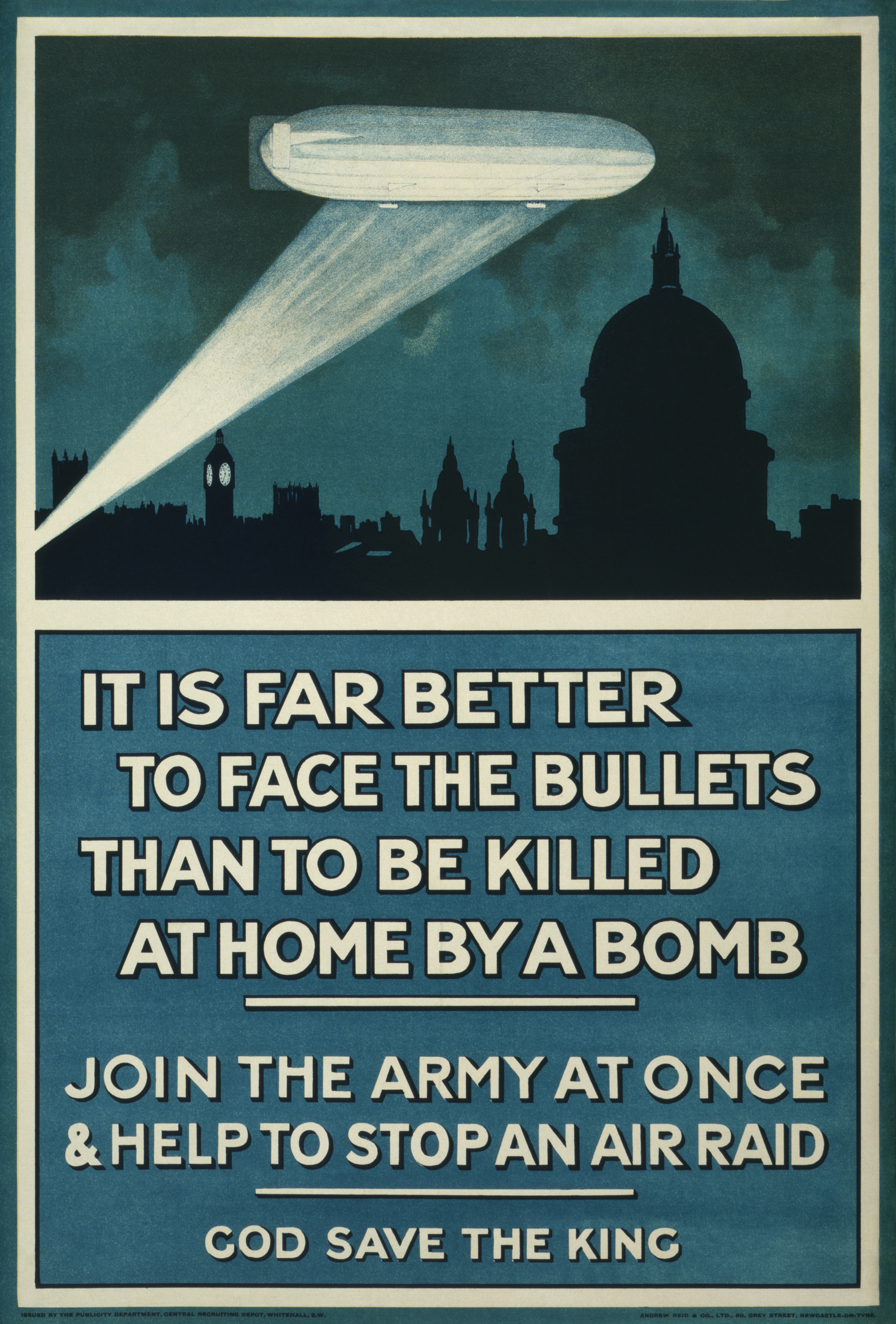
The phrase "God Save the King" in use as a rallying cry to the support of the monarch and the UK's forces during the First World War

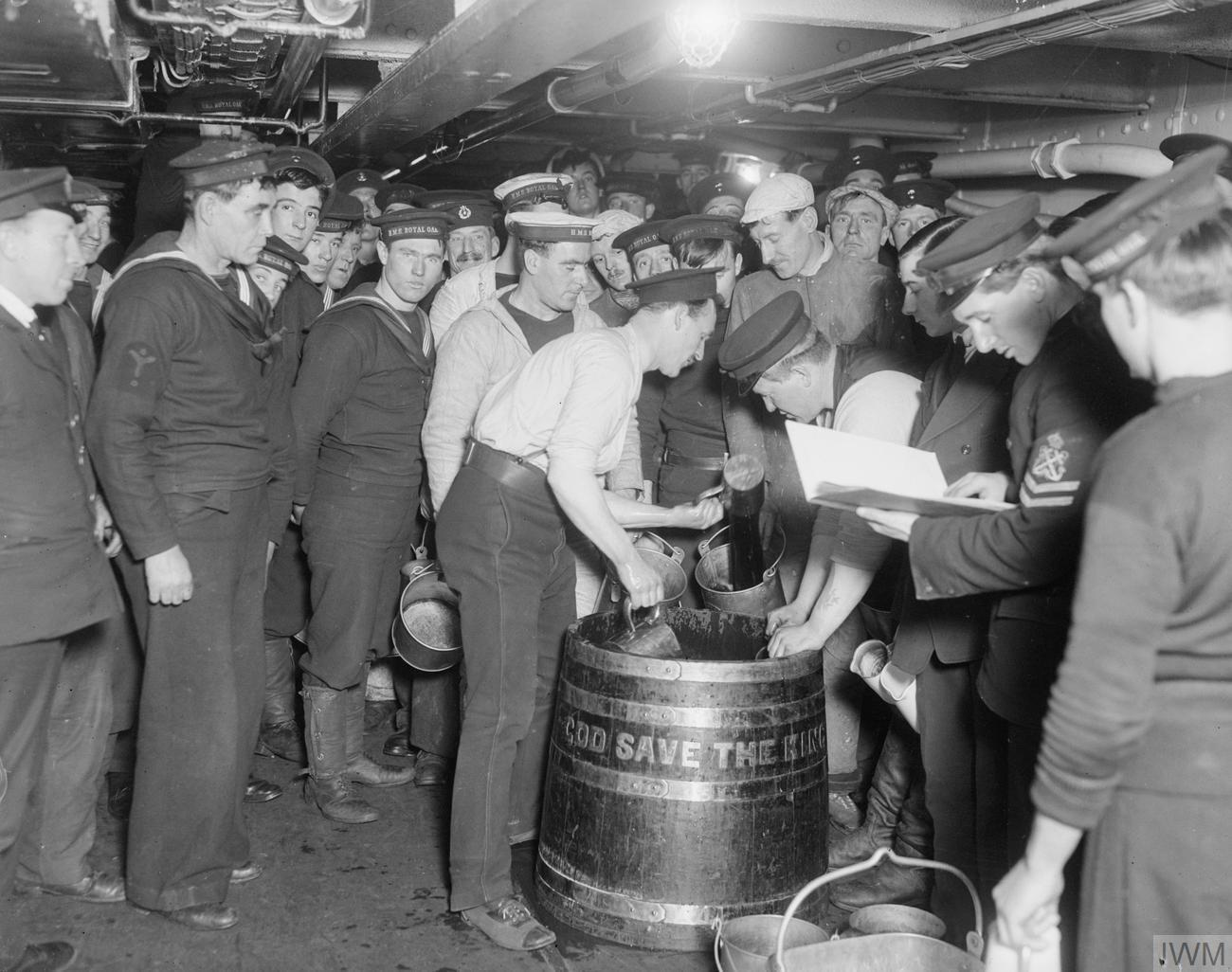
Royal Marines and bluejackets aboard HMS Royal Oak being served their rum rations from a rum tub inscribed with "God save the King" (1916)

Like many aspects of British constitutional life, "God Save the King" derives its official status from custom and use, not from royal proclamation or act of Parliament. The variation in the UK of the lyrics to "God Save the King" is the oldest among those currently used, and forms the basis on which all other versions used throughout the Commonwealth are formed; though, again, the words have varied over time.

England has no official national anthem of its own; "God Save the King" is treated as the English national anthem when England is represented at sporting events (though there are some exceptions to this rule, such as cricket where "Jerusalem" is used). There is a movement to establish an English national anthem, with William Blake's and Hubert Parry's "Jerusalem" and Edward Elgar's "Land of Hope and Glory" among the top contenders. Wales has a de facto national anthem, "Hen Wlad Fy Nhadau" (Land of my Fathers) while Scotland uses unofficial anthems ("Scotland the Brave" was traditionally used until the 1990s; since then, "Flower of Scotland" is more commonly used), these anthems are used formally at state and national ceremonies as well as international sporting events such as football and rugby union matches. On all occasions in Northern Ireland, "God Save the King" is still used as the official anthem.

In 2001, it was claimed that the phrase "No surrender" was occasionally sung in the bridge before "Send her victorious" by England football fans at matches.

Since 2003, "God Save the King", considered an all-inclusive anthem for Great Britain and Northern Ireland, as well as other countries within the Commonwealth, has been dropped from the Commonwealth Games. Northern Irish athletes receive their gold medals to the tune of the "Londonderry Air", popularly known as "Danny Boy". In 2006, English winners heard Elgar's "Pomp and Circumstance March No. 1", usually known as "Land of Hope and Glory", but after a poll conducted by the Commonwealth Games Council for England prior to the 2010 Games, "Jerusalem" was adopted as England's new Commonwealth Games anthem. In sports in which the UK competes as one nation, most notably as Great Britain at the Olympics, the anthem is used to represent anyone or any team that comes from the United Kingdom.

=== Lyrics in the UK ===
First verse sung at the Royal Exchange in 2022

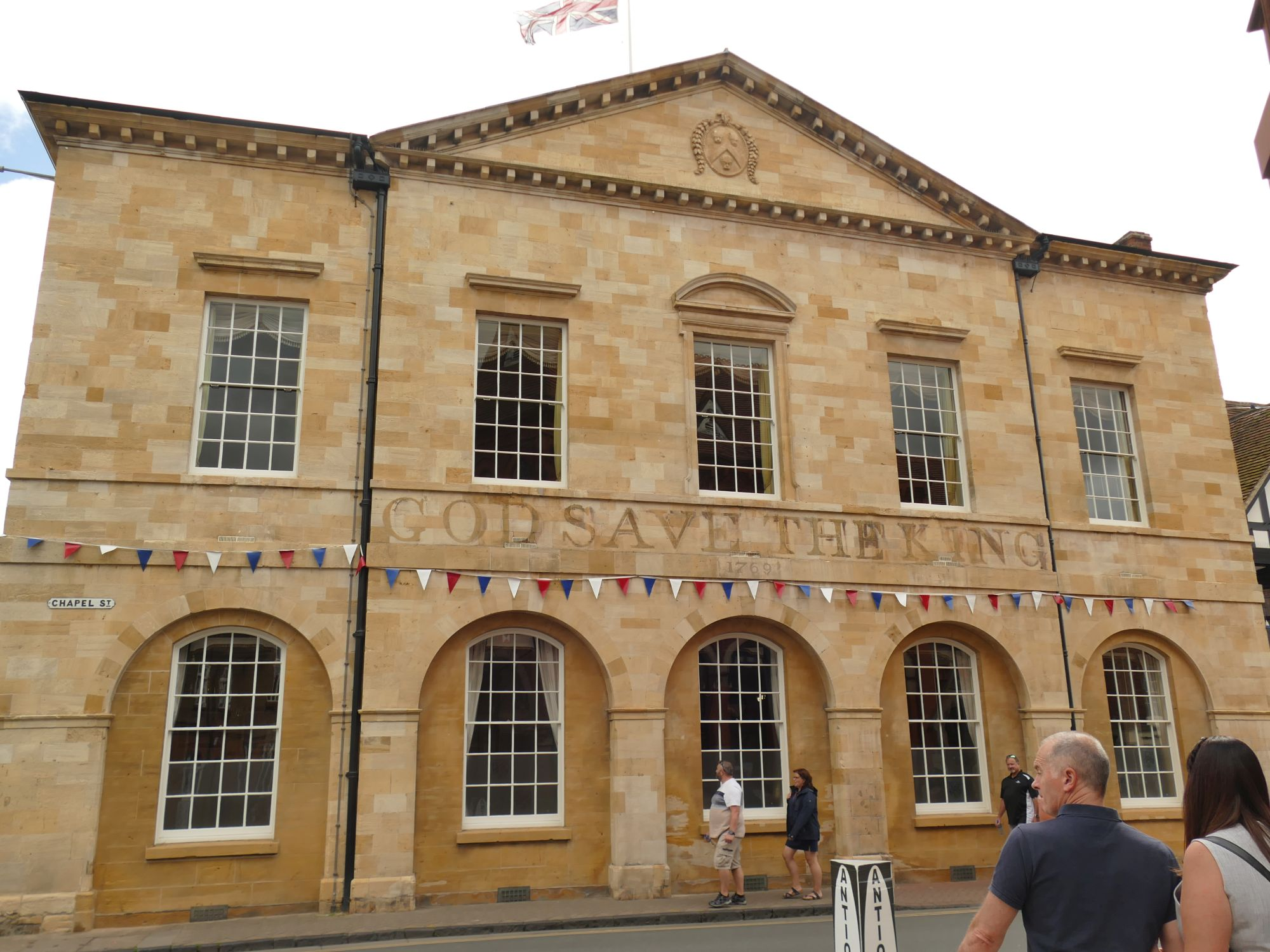
Stratford-upon-Avon Town Hall (built 1767), bearing the painted slogan, "God Save the King"

The phrase "God Save the King" is much older than the song, appearing, for instance, several times in the King James Bible. A text based on the 1st Book of Kings Chapter 1: verses 38–40, "And all the people rejoic'd, and said: God save the King! Long live the King! May the King live for ever, Amen", has been sung and proclaimed at every coronation since that of King Edgar in 973. Scholes says that as early as 1545, "God Save the King" was a watchword of the Royal Navy, with the response being "Long to reign over us". He also notes that the prayer read in churches on anniversaries of the Gunpowder Plot includes words which might have formed part of the basis for the former standard verse "Scatter our enemies...assuage their malice and confound their devices".

In 1745, The Gentleman's Magazine published "God save our lord the king: A new song set for two voices", describing it "As sung at both Playhouses" (the Theatres Royal at Drury Lane and Covent Garden). Traditionally, the first performance was thought to have been in 1745, when it was sung in support of King George II after his defeat at the Battle of Prestonpans by the army of Charles Edward Stuart, son of James Francis Edward Stuart, the Jacobite claimant to the British throne.

It is sometimes claimed that, ironically, the song was originally sung in support of the Jacobite cause: the word "send" in the line "Send him victorious" could imply that the king was absent. However, the Oxford English Dictionary cites examples of "[God] send (a person) safe, victorious, etc." meaning "God grant that he may be safe, etc.". There are also examples of early 18th-century drinking glasses which are inscribed with a version of the words and were apparently intended for drinking the health of King James II and VII.

Scholes acknowledges these possibilities but argues that the same words were probably being used by both Jacobite and Hanoverian supporters and directed at their respective kings.

In 1902, the musician William Hayman Cummings, quoting mid-18th-century correspondence between Charles Burney and Sir Joseph Banks, suggested that the words had been based on a Latin verse composed for King James II at the Chapel Royal.

O Deus optime!
Salvum nunc facito
Regem nostrum;
Sit laeta victoria,
Comes et gloria,
Salvum iam facito,
Tu dominum.

O most excellent God
Save our King now;
May joyous victory and glory
Be his companions,
Save our lord now.

==== Standard version in the United Kingdom ====
"God Save the King" performed with each of its three verses (originally released on a Victor Record phonograph c. 1910)

As the reigning monarch is currently Charles III, the male version of the anthem is used.

When the current monarch is male

God save our gracious King!
Long live our noble King!
God save the King!
Send him victorious,
Happy and glorious,
Long to reign over us,
God save the King!

Thy choicest gifts in store,
On him be pleased to pour;
Long may he reign.
May he defend our laws,
And ever give us cause,
To sing with heart and voice,
God save the King!

When the monarch of the time is female, "King" is replaced with "Queen" and all masculine pronouns are replaced with their feminine equivalents.

There is no definitive version of the lyrics. However, the version consisting of the two above verses has the best claim to be regarded as the "standard" British version as referenced on the Royal Family website. The song with an additional verse appears not only in the 1745 Gentleman's Magazine, but also in publications such as The Book of English Songs: From the Sixteenth to the Nineteenth Century (1851), National Hymns: How They Are Written and How They Are Not Written (1861), Household Book of Poetry (1882), and Hymns Ancient and Modern, Revised Version (1982).

The same version with appears in publications including Scouting for Boys (1908), and on the Royal Family website.

In the UK, the first verse is typically sung alone, even on official occasions, although the second verse is sometimes sung in addition on certain occasions such as during the opening ceremonies of the 2012 Summer Olympics, 2012 Summer Paralympics, and the 2022 Commonwealth Games and usually at the Last Night of the Proms. The second verse was also sung during the coronation of King Charles III and Queen Camilla.

==== Standard version of the music ====
"God Save the Queen" sung by the public at St Giles' Fair, Oxford, 2007

The standard version of the melody and its key of G major are still those of the originally published version, although the start of the anthem is often signalled by an introductory timpani roll of two bars length. The bass line of the standard version differs little from the second voice part shown in the original, and there is a standard version in four-part harmony for choirs. The first three lines (six bars of music) are soft, ending with a short crescendo into "Send him victorious", and then is another crescendo at "over us:" into the final words "God save the King".

In the early-20th century, there existed a military band version in the higher key of B♭, because it was easier for brass instruments to play in that key, though it had the disadvantage of being more difficult to sing; however, now most bands play it in the correct key of concert G.

Since 1953, the anthem is sometimes preceded by a fanfare composed by Gordon Jacob for the coronation of Elizabeth II.

===== O Lord Our God Arise =====
An additional stanza sung second was previously considered part of the standard lyrics in the UK:

O Lord our God arise
Scatter his enemies
And make them fall
Confound their politics
Frustrate their knavish tricks
On thee our hopes we fix
God save us all

These lyrics appeared in some works of literature prior the coronation of Queen Elizabeth II, but only the version mentioned in the Standard Version in the United Kingdom was used at her Coronation, and ever since on all official occasions when two stanzas have been sung.

There have been several attempts to rewrite the words. In the 19th century, there was some lively debate about the national anthem as verse two was considered by some to be slightly offensive in its use of the phrase "scatter her enemies". Some thought it placed better emphasis on the respective power of Parliament and the Crown to change "her enemies" to "our enemies"; others questioned the theology and proposed "thine enemies" instead. Sydney G. R. Coles wrote a completely new version, as did Canon F. K. Harford.

According to Alan Michie's The Crown and the People, which was published in 1952, after the death of King George VI but before the coronation of Queen Elizabeth II, when the first General Assembly of the United Nations was held in London in January 1946, the King, in honour of the occasion, "ordered the belligerent imperious second stanza of 'God Save the King' to be rewritten to bring it more into the spirit of the brotherhood of nations."

===== William Hickson's alternative version =====
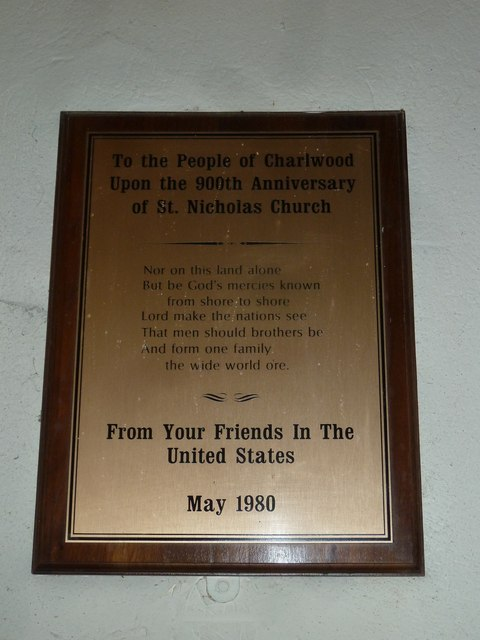
The fourth Hickson verse (with "o'er" misspelled as "o're") on a British-American friendship plaque in St Nicholas' Church, Charlwood, Surrey

In 1836, William Edward Hickson wrote an alternative version, of which the first, third and fourth verses gained some currency when they were appended to the national anthem in The English Hymnal (1906). His fourth verse was sung after the traditional first verse at Queen Elizabeth II's Golden Jubilee National Service of Thanksgiving in 2002, and during the raising of the Union Flag during the 2008 Summer Paralympics closing ceremony, in which London took Paralympic flag from Beijing to host the 2012 Summer games. This verse is currently used as the final verse by the Church of Scotland.

God bless our native land!
May Heav'n's protecting hand
Still guard our shore:
May peace his power extend,
Foe be transformed to friend,
And Britain's rights depend
On war no more.

O Lord, our monarch bless
With strength and righteousness:
Long may he reign:
His heart inspire and move
With wisdom from above;
And in a nation's love
His throne maintain.

May just and righteous laws
Uphold the public cause,
And bless our Isle:
Home of the brave and free,
Thou land of Liberty,
We pray that still on thee
Kind Heav'n may smile.

Not in this land alone,
But be God's mercies known
From shore to shore:
Lord make the nations see
That men should brothers be,
And form one family
The wide world o'er.

===== Samuel Reynolds Hole's alternative version =====
To mark the celebration of the Diamond Jubilee of Queen Victoria, a modified version of the second verse was written by the Dean of Rochester, the Very Reverend Samuel Reynolds Hole. A four-part harmony setting was then made by Frederick Bridge, and published by Novello.

O Lord Our God Arise,
Scatter her enemies,
Make wars to cease;
Keep us from plague and dearth,
Turn thou our woes to mirth;
And over all the earth
Let there be peace.

The Musical Times commented: "There are some conservative minds who may regret the banishment of the 'knavish tricks' and aggressive spirit of the discarded verse, but it must be admitted that Dean Hole's lines are more consonant with the sentiment of modern Christianity." Others reactions were more negative, one report describing the setting as "unwarrantable liberties...worthy of the severest reprobation", with "too much of a Peace Society flavour about it...If we go about pleading for peace, other nations will get it into their heads that we are afraid of fighting." Perhaps unsurprisingly, Hole's version failed to replace the existing verse permanently.

===== Official peace version =====
A less militaristic version of the song, titled "Official peace version, 1919", was first published in the hymn book Songs of Praise in 1925. This was "official" in the sense that it was approved by the British Privy Council in 1919. However, despite being reproduced in some other hymn books, it is largely unknown today.

God save our gracious King!
Long live our noble King!
God save the King!
Send him victorious
Happy and glorious
Long to reign over us
God save the King!

One realm of races four (Note: Referring to the English, Irish/Northern Irish, Scots and Welsh.)
Blest more and ever more
God save our land!
Home of the brave and free
Set in the silver sea
True nurse of chivalry
God save our land!

Of many a race and birth
From utmost ends of earth
God save us all!
Bid strife and hatred cease
Bid hope and joy increase
Spread universal peace
God save us all!

==== Historic Jacobite and anti-Jacobite alternative verses ====
Around 1745 anti-Jacobite sentiment was captured in a verse appended to the song, with a prayer for the success of Field Marshal George Wade's army then assembling at Newcastle. These words attained some short-term use, although they did not appear in the published version in the October 1745 Gentleman's Magazine. This verse was first documented as an occasional addition to the original anthem by Richard Clark in 1814, and was also mentioned in a later article on the song, published by the Gentleman's Magazine in October 1836. Therein, it is presented as an "additional verse... though being of temporary application only... stored in the memory of an old friend... who was born in the very year 1745, and was thus the associate of those who heard it first sung", the lyrics given being:

Lord, grant that Marshal Wade
May by thy mighty aid
Victory bring;
May he sedition hush,
and like a torrent rush
Rebellious Scots to crush!
God save the King!

The 1836 article and other sources make it clear that this verse was quickly abandoned after 1745 (Wade was replaced as Commander-in-Chief within a year following the Jacobite invasion of England), and it was certainly not used when the song became accepted as the British national anthem in the 1780s and 1790s. It was included as an integral part of the song in the Oxford Book of Eighteenth-Century Verse of 1926, although erroneously referencing the "fourth verse" to the Gentleman's Magazine article of 1745.

On the opposing side, Jacobite beliefs were demonstrated in an alternative verse used during the same period:

God bless the prince, I pray,
God bless the prince, I pray,
Charlie I mean;
That Scotland we may see
Freed from vile Presbyt'ry,
Both George and his Feckie,
Ever so, Amen.

In May 1800, following an attempt to assassinate King George III at the Theatre Royal, Drury Lane, in London, the playwright Richard Sheridan immediately composed an additional verse, which was sung from the stage the same night:

From every latent foe
From the assassin's blow
God save the King
O'er him Thine arm extend
For Britain's sake defend
Our father, king, and friend
God save the King!

Various other attempts were made during the eighteenth and nineteenth centuries to add verses to commemorate particular royal or national events. For example, according to Fitzroy Maclean, when Jacobite forces bypassed Wade's force and reached Derby, but then retreated and when their garrison at Carlisle Castle surrendered to a second government army led by King George's son, the Duke of Cumberland, another verse was added. Other short-lived verses were notably anti-French, such as the following, quoted in the book Handel by Edward J. Dent:

From France and Pretender
Great Britain defend her,
Foes let them fall;
From foreign slavery,
Priests and their knavery,
And Popish Reverie,
God save us all.

However, none of these additional verses survived into the 20th century. Updated "full" versions including additional verses have been published more recently, including the standard three verses, Hickson's fourth verse, Sheridan's verse and the Marshal Wade verse.

==== Historic republican alternative ====
A version from 1794 composed by the American republican and French citizen Joel Barlow celebrated the power of the guillotine to liberate:

God save the Guillotine
Till England's King and Queen
Her power shall prove:
Till each appointed knob
Affords a clipping job
Let no vile halter rob
The Guillotine

France, let thy trumpet sound –
Tell all the world around
How Capet fell;
And when great George's poll
Shall in the basket roll,
Let mercy then control
The Guillotine

When all the sceptre'd crew
Have paid their Homage, due
The Guillotine
Let Freedom's flag advance
Till all the world, like France
O'er tyrants' graves shall dance
And peace begin.

=== Performance in the UK ===
The style most commonly heard in official performances was proposed as the "proper interpretation" by King George V, who considered himself something of an expert (in view of the number of times he had heard it). An Army Order was duly issued in 1933, which laid down regulations for tempo, dynamics and orchestration. This included instructions such as that the opening "six bars will be played quietly by the reed band with horns and basses in a single phrase. Cornets and side-drum are to be added at the little scale-passage leading into the second half of the tune, and the full brass enters for the last eight bars". The official tempo for the opening section is a metronome setting of 60, with the second part played in a broader manner, at a metronome setting of 52. In recent years the prescribed sombre-paced introduction is often played at a faster and livelier tempo.

Until the latter part of the 20th century, theatre and concert goers were expected to stand while the anthem was played after the conclusion of a show. In cinemas this brought a tendency for audiences to rush out while the end credits played to avoid this formality. (This can be seen in the 1972 Dad's Army episode "A Soldier's Farewell".)

The anthem continues to be played at some traditional events such as Wimbledon, Royal Variety Performance, the Edinburgh Tattoo, Royal Ascot, Henley Royal Regatta and The Proms as well as at royal events.

The anthem was traditionally played at close-down on the BBC, and with the introduction of commercial television to the UK this practice was adopted by some ITV companies (with the notable exceptions of Granada, Thames Television, Central Television, Border Television and Yorkshire Television). BBC Two also never played the anthem at close-down, and ITV dropped the practice in the late 1980s when the network switched to 24 hour broadcasting, but it continued on BBC One until 8 November 1997 (thereafter BBC One began to simulcast with BBC News after end of programmes). The tradition is carried on, however, by BBC Radio 4, which plays the anthem each night as a transition piece between the end of the Radio 4 broadcasting and the move to BBC World Service. BBC Radio 4 and BBC Radio 2 also play the National Anthem just before the 0700 and 0800 news bulletins on the actual and official birthdays of the King and the birthdays of senior members of the Royal Family. On 17 January 2022 GB News started playing the anthem at 05:59 every morning at the beginning of the day's programming.

The UK's national anthem usually prefaces the royal Christmas message (although in 2007 it appeared at the end, taken from a recording of the 1957 television broadcast), and important royal announcements, such as of royal deaths, when it is played in a slower, sombre arrangement.

=== Other British anthems ===
Frequently, when an anthem is needed for one of the constituent countries of the United Kingdom – at an international sporting event, for instance – an alternative song is used:

- England generally uses "God Save the King", but "Jerusalem", "Rule, Britannia!" and "Land of Hope and Glory" have also been used.
  - At international test cricket matches, England has, since 2004, used "Jerusalem" as the anthem.
  - At international rugby league matches, England uses "God Save the King" and also "Jerusalem".
  - At international rugby union and football matches, England uses "God Save the King".
  - At the Commonwealth Games, Team England uses "Jerusalem" as their victory anthem.
- Scotland uses "Flower of Scotland" as their anthem for most sporting occasions.
- Wales uses "Hen Wlad Fy Nhadau" ("Land of My Fathers") for governmental ceremonies and sporting occasions. At official occasions, especially those with royal connections, "God Save the King" is also played.
- Northern Ireland uses "God Save the King" as its national anthem. However, many Irish nationalists feel unrepresented by the British anthem and seek an alternative. Northern Ireland also uses the "Londonderry Air" as its victory anthem at the Commonwealth Games. When sung, the "Londonderry Air" has the lyrics to "Danny Boy". At international rugby union matches, where Northern Irish players compete alongside those from the Republic of Ireland as part of an All-Ireland team, "Ireland's Call" is used.
- The British and Irish Lions rugby union tour of 2005 used the song "The Power of Four", but this experiment has not been repeated.

The London 2012 Olympics Opening Ceremony provided a conscious use of three of the four anthems listed above; the ceremony began with a rendition of the first verse of "Jerusalem", before a choir in Northern Ireland sang "Danny Boy" and a choir in Edinburgh performed part of "Flower of Scotland". Notably, Wales was represented by the hymn "Bread of Heaven", not "Hen Wlad Fy Nhadhau".

In April 2007 there was an early day motion, number 1319, to the British Parliament to propose that there should be a separate England anthem: "That this House ... believes that all English sporting associations should adopt an appropriate song that English sportsmen and women, and the English public, would favour when competing as England". An amendment (EDM 1319A3) was proposed by Evan Harris of the Liberal Democrats that the song "should have a bit more oomph than God Save The Queen and should also not involve God."

For more information see also:

- National anthem of England
- National anthem of Scotland
- Hen Wlad Fy Nhadau
- National anthem of Northern Ireland

=== Use in media ===
On 3 November 2016, Andrew Rosindell, a Conservative Party MP, argued in an early day motion for a return to the broadcasting of the national anthem at the end of BBC One transmissions each day (the practice had been dropped in 1997, due to BBC One adopting 24-hour broadcasting by simulcasting BBC News 24 overnight, rendering closedown obsolete), to commemorate the Brexit vote and Britain's subsequent withdrawing from the European Union. At the evening of the same day, BBC Two's Newsnight programme ended its nightly broadcast with host of that night, Kirsty Wark, saying that they were "incredibly happy to oblige" Rosindell's request, and then played a clip of the Sex Pistols' similarly named song, much to Rosindell's discontent.

Since 18 January 2022, GB News has played the national anthem at the start of live programming every day.

== Use in other Commonwealth countries ==
"God Save the King" was exported around the world via the expansion of the British Empire, serving as each country's national anthem. Throughout the Empire's evolution into the Commonwealth of Nations, the song declined in use in most states which became independent. In New Zealand, it remains one of the official national anthems.

=== Antigua and Barbuda ===
Contrary to popular belief, "God Save The King" is not the royal anthem of Antigua and Barbuda in practice or officially. As of August 2025, there is no legislation in Antigua and Barbuda establishing a royal anthem, and during a royal visit in 2017, members of the royal family were greeted by the de facto national anthem "Fair Antigua, We Salute Thee". The Governor-General is also greeted by "Fair Antigua, We Salute Thee" in all formal circumstances.

=== Australia ===
In Australia "God Save the King" was declared as the royal anthem on 27 October 2022, replacing the previous declaration of "God Save the Queen" as the royal anthem on 19 April 1984. It declares that the song is to be played when the monarch or a member of the royal family is present. The Australian Government also advises that when the King is in Australia, the royal anthem is played at the beginning of an event and the national anthem, "Advance Australia Fair", is to be played at the end.

Prior to 1974, "God Save the Queen" was the national anthem of Australia. It was replaced that year with "Advance Australia Fair" by the Labor Whitlam government. Following the elevation of the Liberal Fraser government, "God Save the Queen" was restored as the national anthem in 1976 alongside three other "national songs". A plebiscite held in 1977 preferred "Advance Australia Fair" as the exclusive "national song", to exist alongside the national anthem of "God Save the Queen". The subsequent Labor Hawke government later advised the proclamation of "Advance Australia Fair" as the national anthem in 1984, with "God Save the Queen" redesignated as the royal anthem.

=== Belize ===
"God Save the King" is the royal anthem of Belize. The viceregal salute to the Belizean governor-general is composed of the first verse of "God Save the King" and the chorus of national anthem, "Land of the Free".

=== Canada ===
Percival Price performs "O Canada" and "God Save the King" on the Peace Tower Carillon, 1927.

By convention "God Save the King" (French: Dieu Sauve le Roi, Dieu Sauve la Reine when a Queen) is the royal anthem of Canada. It is sometimes played or sung together with the national anthem, "O Canada", at private and public events organised by groups such as the Government of Canada, the Royal Canadian Legion, police services and loyal groups. The governor general and provincial lieutenant governors are accorded the "Viceregal Salute", comprising the first three lines of "God Save the King", followed by the first and last lines of "O Canada".

"God Save the King" has been sung in Canada since the late 1700s and by the mid-20th century was, along with "O Canada", one of the country's two de facto national anthems, the first and last verses of the standard British version being used. By-laws and practices governing the use of either song during public events in municipalities varied; in Toronto, "God Save the King" was employed, while in Montreal it was "O Canada". Prime Minister Lester B. Pearson in 1964 said one song would have to be chosen as the country's national anthem and, three years later, he advised Governor General Georges Vanier to appoint the Special Joint Committee of the Senate and House of Commons on the National and Royal Anthems. Within two months, on 12 April 1967, the committee presented its conclusion that "God Save the Queen" (as this was during the reign of Queen Elizabeth II), whose music and lyrics were found to be in the public domain, should be designated as the royal anthem of Canada and "O Canada" as the national anthem, one verse from each, in both official languages, to be adopted by parliament. The group was then charged with establishing official lyrics for each song; for "God Save the Queen", the English words were those inherited from the United Kingdom and the French words were taken from those that had been adopted in 1952 for the coronation of Elizabeth II. When the bill pronouncing "O Canada" as the national anthem was put through parliament, the joint committee's earlier recommendations regarding "God Save the Queen" were not included.

The Department of National Defence and the Canadian Forces regulates that "God Save the King" be played as a salute to the monarch of Canada and other members of the Canadian royal family, though it may also be used as a hymn or prayer. The words are not to be sung when the song is played as a military royal salute and is abbreviated to the first three lines, while arms are being presented. Elizabeth II stipulated that the arrangement in G major by Lieutenant Colonel Basil H. Brown be used in Canada. The authorised version to be played by pipe bands is Mallorca.

==== Lyrics in Canada ====
"God Save the King" has been translated into French, but this translation does not fit the music and cannot be sung. Nevertheless, this translation has been adapted into a bilingual version that can be sung when the monarch is male, and has been sung during public ceremonies, such as the National Remembrance Day Ceremony at the National War Memorial in Ottawa:

Dieu sauve notre Roi,
Notre gracieux Roi,
Vive le Roi!
Send him victorious,
Happy and glorious;
Long to reign over us,
God save the King!

A special singable one-verse adaptation is used when a singable French version is required, such as when royalty is present at an official occasion:

Dieu sauve notre Roi!
Notre gracieux Roi!
Vive le Roi!
Rends-lui victorieux,
Heureux et glorieux,
Que soit long son règne sur nous,
Vive le Roi!

There is a special Canadian verse in English which was once commonly sung in addition to the two standing verses:

Our loved Dominion bless
With peace and happiness
From shore to shore;
And let our Empire be
Loyal, united, free,
True to herself and Thee
For evermore.

=== Channel Islands ===
"God Save the King" is used by both Bailiwicks of the Channel Islands as an alternative to their respective national anthems. Its use case and popular version is generally similar to how it is used in the United Kingdom. However, the anthem has been translated in Jèrriais:

Dgieu sauve not' Duc,
Longue vie à not' Duc,
Dgieu sauve la Rei!
Rends-la victorieuse
Jouaiyeuse et glorieuse;
Qu'on règne sus nous heûtheuse –
Dgieu sauve la Rei!

Tes dons les pus précieux,
Sus yi vèrse des cieux,
Dgieu sauve la Rei!
Qu'on défende nous louais
Et d'un tchoeu et d'eune vouaix
Jé chantons à janmais
Dgieu sauve la Rei!

The meaning is broadly similar to the first paragraph of the English version, except for the first two lines which say "God save our Duke" and "Long live our Duke".

=== New Zealand ===
New Zealand inherited "God Save the King" as its anthem, which served as the sole national anthem until 1977, when "God Defend New Zealand" was introduced as a second. Since then, "God Save the King" is most often only played when the sovereign, governor-general or other member of the Royal Family is present, or on some occasions such as Anzac Day. The Māori-language version was written by Edward Marsh Williams under the title, "E te atua tohungia te kuini".

There is a special New Zealand verse in English which was once commonly sung to replace the second and third verses:

Not on this land alone
But be God's mercies known
From shore to shore.
Lord, make the nations see
That we in liberty
Should form one family
The wide world o'er.

==== Lyrics in Māori ====
All verses of "God Save the King" have been translated into the Māori language. The three verses is shown below:

Me tohu e te Atua
To matou Kīngi pai:
Kia ora ia
Meinga kia maia ia,
Kia hari nui, kia koa,
Kia kingi tonu ia,
Tau tini noa.

Ko ona hoa whawhai,
Kia kore maia mai,
Kia whati noa.
Me whakaruru mai
A ratou hui e koe;
To matou Kīngi pai
Tau tini noa.

Nga tino mea papai,
Me tuku mai e koe
Māna katoa.
Ko ia kira kuini roa,
Hei take mo te koa,
E mapu ai te reo
Kia ora ia.

=== Rhodesia ===
When Rhodesia issued its Unilateral Declaration of Independence from the UK on 11 November 1965, it did so while still maintaining loyalty to Queen Elizabeth II as the Rhodesian head of state, despite the non-recognition of the Rhodesian government by the United Kingdom and the United Nations; "God Save the Queen" therefore remained the Rhodesian national anthem. This was supposed to demonstrate the continued allegiance of the Rhodesian people to the monarch, but the retention in Rhodesia of a song so associated with the UK while the two countries were at loggerheads regarding its constitutional status caused Rhodesian state occasions to have "a faintly ironic tone", in the words of The Times. Nevertheless, "God Save the Queen" remained Rhodesia's national anthem until March 1970, when it formally declared itself a republic. "Rise, O Voices of Rhodesia" was adopted in its stead in 1974 and remained in use until the country returned to the UK's control in December 1979. Since the internationally recognised independence of the Republic of Zimbabwe in April 1980, "God Save the King" has had no official status there.

=== Saint Vincent and the Grenadines ===
"God Save the King" is the royal anthem of Saint Vincent and the Grenadines. It is played on royal and vice-regal occasions. The Vice-Regal Salute to the governor general is composed of the chorus of "God Save the King" and followed by that of the National Anthem, "Saint Vincent, Land so Beautiful".

All proclamations in Saint Vincent and the Grenadines end with the phrase: "God Save the King".

=== South Africa ===
"God Save the King" (Afrikaans: God Red die Koning, God Red die Koningin when a Queen) was a co-national anthem of South Africa from 1938 until 1957, when it was formally replaced by "Die Stem van Suid-Afrika" as the sole national anthem. The latter served as a sort of de facto co-national anthem alongside the former until 1938.

== Use elsewhere ==
The melody has often been used, with lyrics slightly or significantly altered, for royal or national anthems of other countries.

During the 19th century, it was used officially in Sweden, (Note: See Bevare Gud vår kung.) and in Iceland. (Note: Where it was set to Íslands minni ("To Iceland", better known as Eldgamla Ísafold), a poem by Bjarni Thorarensen.) It was also in official usage for brief periods in Imperial Russia, (Note: See Molitva russkikh.) in Greece, Siam (Note: See Chom Rat Chong Charoen.) and in the Kingdom of Hawaii. It remains as the royal anthem of Norway ("Gud sign vår Konge god").

In Germany, it was used by the kingdoms of Prussia, Hanover, Saxony, Württemberg and Bavaria, and was adopted as anthem of the German emperor ("Heil dir im Siegerkranz") after unification in 1871; however, it lacked the support necessary to become the official anthem of the empire. It remains as the national anthem of Liechtenstein, and was used by Switzerland until 1961 ("Rufst du, mein Vaterland").

In Latvia, it was used by Latvians for the patriotic song "Dievs, svētī Kurzemi/Vidzemi!" ("God bless Kurzeme/Vidzeme!", depending on the region it was used in) in the 19th century.

== Musical adaptations ==
=== Composers ===
About 140 composers have used the tune in their compositions.

Ludwig van Beethoven composed a set of seven piano variations in the key of C major to the theme of "God Save the King", catalogued as WoO 78 (1802–1803). He also quotes it in his orchestral work Wellington's Victory. It is also the first song arranged in the collection WoO 157.

Muzio Clementi used the theme to "God Save the King" in his Symphony No. 3 in G major, often called the "Great National Symphony", catalogued as WoO 34. Clementi paid a high tribute to his adopted homeland (the United Kingdom) where he grew up and stayed most of his lifetime. He based the symphony (about 1816–1824) on "God Save the King", which is hinted at earlier in the work, not least in the second movement, and announced by the trombones in the finale.

Johann Christian Bach composed a set of variations on "God Save the King" for the finale to his sixth keyboard concerto (Op. 1) written c. 1763.

Joseph Haydn was impressed by the use of "God Save the King" as a national anthem during his visit to London in 1794, and on his return to Austria composed a different tune, "Gott erhalte Franz den Kaiser" ("God Save Emperor Francis"), for the birthday of the last Holy Roman Emperor and Roman-German King, Francis II, which became the basis for the anthem of the later Austrian Empire, and ultimately for the German national anthem.

Franz Liszt wrote a piano paraphrase on the anthem (S.259 in the official catalogue, c. 1841).

Johann Strauss I quoted "God Save the Queen" in full at the end of his waltz "Huldigung der Königin Victoria von Grossbritannien" (Homage to Queen Victoria of Great Britain), Op. 103, where he also quoted "Rule, Britannia!" in full at the beginning of the piece.

Siegfried August Mahlmann in the early 19th century wrote alternate lyrics to adapt the hymn for the Kingdom of Saxony, as "Gott segne Sachsenland" ("God Bless Saxony").

Christian Heinrich Rinck wrote two sets of variations on the anthem: the last movement of his Piano Trio, Op. 34, No. 1 (1815) is a set of five variations and a concluding coda; and Theme (Andante) and (12) Variations in C major on "Heil dir im Siegerkranz" (God Save the King), Op. 55.

Heinrich Marschner used the anthem in his "Grande Ouverture solennelle", Op. 78 (1842).

Gaetano Donizetti used this anthem in his opera "Roberto Devereux".

Joachim Raff used this anthem in his Jubelouverture, Op. 103 (1864) dedicated to Adolf, Duke of Nassau, on the 25th anniversary of his reign.

Gioachino Rossini used this anthem in the last scene of his Il viaggio a Reims, when all the characters, coming from many different European countries, sing a song which recalls their own homeland. Lord Sidney, bass, sings "Della real pianta" on the notes of "God Save the King". Samuel Ramey used to interpolate a spectacular virtuoso cadenza at the end of the song.

Fernando Sor used the anthem in his 12 Studies, Op. 6: No. 10 in C major in the section marked 'Maestoso.'

Arthur Sullivan quotes the anthem at the end of his ballet Victoria and Merrie England.

Claude Debussy opens with a brief introduction of "God Save the King" in one of his Preludes, Hommage à S. Pickwick Esq. P.P.M.P.C.. The piece draws its inspiration from the main character of the Charles Dickens novel The Pickwick Papers.

Niccolò Paganini wrote a set of highly virtuosic variations on "God Save the King" as his Op. 9.

Max Reger wrote Variations and Fugue on 'Heil dir im Siegerkranz' (God Save the King) for organ in 1901 after the death of Queen Victoria. It does not have an opus number.

A week before the Coronation Ode was due to be premiered at the June 1902 "Coronation Gala Concert" at Covent Garden (it was cancelled, owing to the King's illness), Sir Edward Elgar introduced an arrangement of "Land of Hope and Glory" as a solo song performed by Clara Butt at a "Coronation Concert" at the Albert Hall. Novello seized upon the prevailing patriotism and requested that Elgar arrange the National Anthem as an appropriate opening for a concert performed in front of the Court and numerous British and foreign dignitaries. This version for orchestra and chorus, which is enlivened by use of a cappella and marcato effects, was also performed at the opening of the British Empire Exhibition at Wembley on St. George's Day, 1924, and recorded under the composer's baton in 1928, with the London Symphony Orchestra and the Philharmonic Choir. Elgar also used the first verse of the anthem as the climax of a short "Civic Procession and Anthem", written to accompany the mayoral procession at the opening of the Hereford Music Festival on 4 September 1927. This premiere performance was recorded, and is today available on CD; the score was lost following the festival, and Elgar reconstructed it by ear from the recording.

Carl Maria von Weber uses the "God Save the King" theme at the end of his "Jubel Overture".

Giuseppe Verdi included "God Save the Queen" in his "Inno delle nazioni" (Hymn of the Nations), composed for the London 1862 International Exhibition.

Benjamin Britten arranged "God Save the Queen" in 1961 for the Leeds Festival. This version has been programmed several times at the Last Night of the Proms.

Charles Ives wrote Variations on "America" for organ in 1891 at age seventeen. It included a polytonal section in three simultaneous keys, though this was omitted from performances at his father's request, because "it made the boys laugh out loud". Ives was fond of the rapid pedal line in the final variation, which he said was "almost as much fun as playing baseball". The piece was not published until 1949; the final version includes an introduction, seven variations and a polytonal interlude. The piece was adapted for orchestra in 1963 by William Schuman. This version became popular during the bicentennial celebrations, and is often heard at pops concerts.

Muthuswami Dikshitar (1776–1835), one of the musical trinity in South Indian classical (Carnatic) music composed some Sanskrit pieces set to Western tunes. These are in the raga Sankarabharanam and are referred to as "nottu swaras". Among these, the composition "Santatam Pahimam Sangita Shyamale" is set to the tune of "God Save the Queen".

Sigismond Thalberg (1812–1871), Swiss composer and one of the most famous virtuoso pianists of the 19th century, wrote a fantasia on "God Save the Queen".

Johan Nepomuk Hummel (1778–1837) wrote Variations on God Save the King in D major, Op. 10 and quoted the tune briefly in his Freudenfest-Ouverture in D major, S 148.

Jan Ladislav Dussek wrote a set of theme with 5 variations for piano on God Save the King.

Adolphe Blanc wrote a set of variations for piano six hands on this theme.

Adrien-François Servais (1807–66) and Joseph Ghys (1801–48) wrote Variations brillantes et concertantes sur l'air "God Save the King", Op. 38, for violin and cello and performed it in London and St Petersburg.

Georges Onslow (1784–1853) used the tune in his String Quartet No. 7 in G minor, Op. 9, second movement.

Hans Huber used the melody ("Rufst du, mein Vaterland") in the first movement of his Symphony no 3 in C minor, Op. 118 ("Heroic").

Ferdinando Carulli used the melody in Fantaisie sur un air national anglais, for recorder & guitar, Op. 102.

Louis Drouet composed "Variations on the air God save the King" for flute and piano.

Gordon Jacob wrote a choral arrangement of "God Save the Queen" with a trumpet fanfare introduction, for the coronation of Queen Elizabeth II in 1953.

=== Rock adaptations ===
Jimi Hendrix played an impromptu version of "God Save the Queen" to open his set at the Isle of Wight Festival 1970. Just before walking onto the stage, he asked "How does it [the anthem] go again?". Hendrix gave the same sort of distortion and improvisation of "God Save the Queen", as he had done with "The Star-Spangled Banner" at the Woodstock Festival in 1969.

Queen recorded an instrumental version of "God Save the Queen" for their 1975 album A Night at the Opera. Guitarist Brian May adapted the melody using layers of overdubbed electric guitars, a technique he also used on many other Queen songs. This recorded version was played at the end of every Queen concert from the end of 1974 to 1986, while the members of the band took their bows. On Queen's Magic Tour in 1986, vocalist Freddie Mercury would leave the stage shortly before the end of the show, and return wearing a crown and cloak as "God Save the Queen" played. On 3 June 2002, during the Queen's Golden Jubilee, May performed the anthem on his Red Special electric guitar for Party at the Palace from the roof of Buckingham Palace. Footage of this performance appears on a DVD that was included 30th Anniversary edition of A Night at the Opera.

In 1977, the Sex Pistols recorded a song titled "God Save the Queen" in open reference to the national anthem and the Queen's Silver Jubilee celebrations that year, with the song intending to stand for sympathy for the working class and resentment of the monarchy. They were banned from many venues, censored by mainstream media, and reached number 2 on the official UK singles charts and number 1 on the NME chart.

A version of "God Save the Queen" by the ska band Madness features the melody of the song played on kazoos. It was included on the compilation album The Business – the Definitive Singles Collection.

=== Computer music ===
The anthem was the first piece of music played on a computer, and the first computer music to be recorded.

Musical notes were first generated by a computer programmed by Alan Turing at the Computing Machine Laboratory of the University of Manchester in 1948. The first music proper, a performance of the National Anthem was programmed by Christopher Strachey on the Mark II Manchester Electronic Computer at same venue, in 1951. Later that year, short extracts of three pieces, the first being the National Anthem, were recorded there by a BBC outside broadcasting unit: the other pieces being "Baa Baa Black Sheep" and "In the Mood". Researchers at the University of Canterbury, Christchurch restored the acetate master disc in 2016 and the results may be heard on SoundCloud.

== Reception ==
The philosopher and reformer Jeremy Bentham praised "God Save the King" in 1796: "the melody recommending itself by beauty to the most polished ears, and by its simplicity to the rudest ear. A song of this complexion, implanted by the habit of half a century in the mass of popular sentiment, can not be refused a place in the inventory of the national blessings." Ludwig van Beethoven wrote "I have to show the English a little of what a blessing 'God Save the King' is".

=== Calls for a new national anthem(s) ===
There have been calls within the UK for a new national anthem, whether it be for the United Kingdom itself, Britain or England (which all currently use "God Save the King"). There are many reasons people cite for wishing for a new national anthem, such as: from a secular standpoint, claims of "God Save the King" being long outdated and irrelevant in the 21st century, rejection of odes to promoting war and imperialism and rejection of praising the monarchy from a republican perspective. A further reason is that England has no anthem of its own for sporting contests and the like, whereas Scotland, Northern Ireland and Wales have unofficial anthems—"Flower of Scotland", "Londonderry Air" and "Hen Wlad Fy Nhadau"—while England tends to use "God Save the King" exclusively and also unofficially.

== See also ==
- List of British anthems, for regional anthems used in the United Kingdom, crown dependencies and British overseas territories
