= Johann Rudolf Wyss =

Swiss author, writer and folklorist

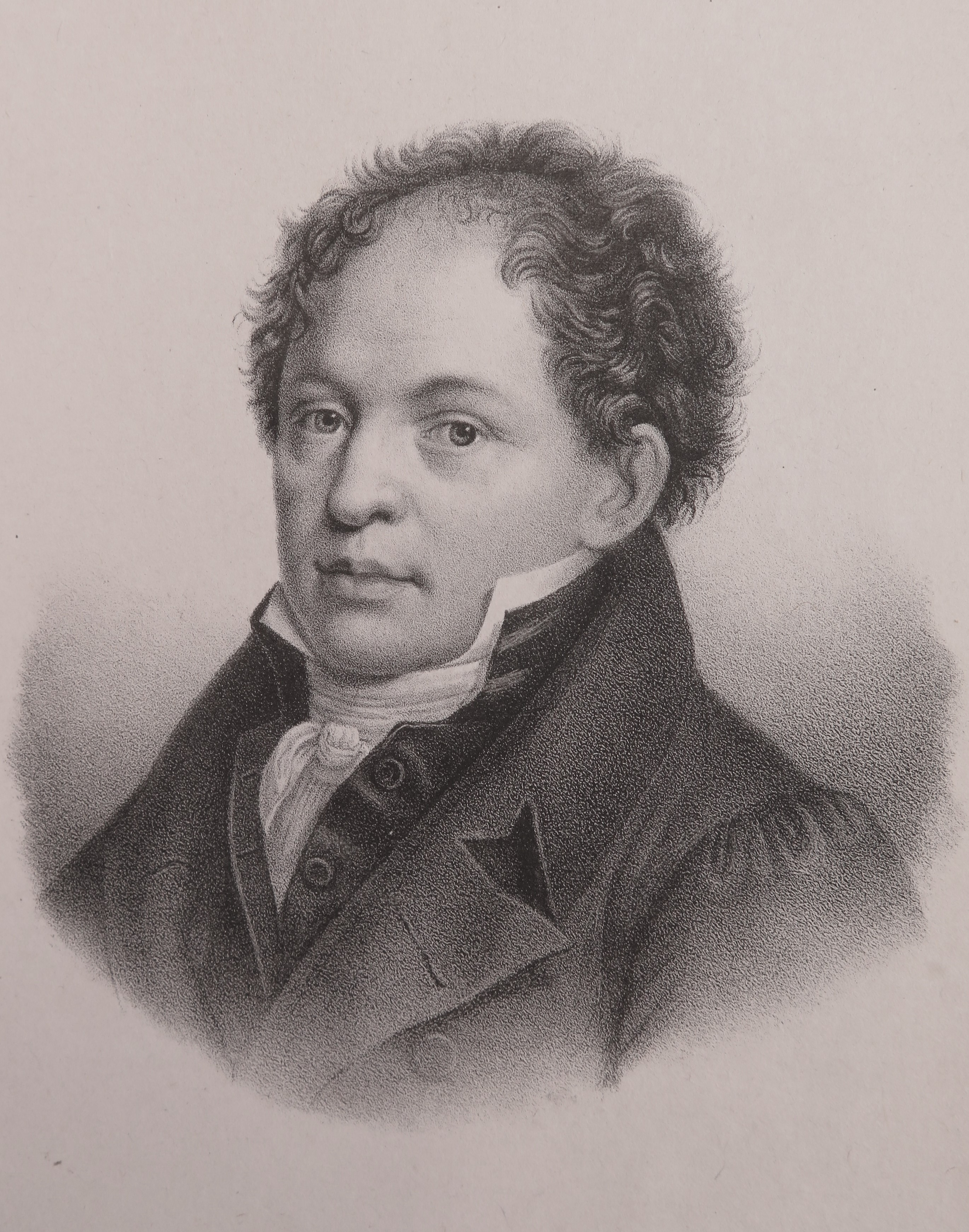
- Lithograph of Wyss, published in 1868
- Born: 4 March 1782
- Died: 21 March 1830 (aged 48); Bern, Swiss Confederation
- Occupations: Author, writer, folklorist
- Relatives: Johann David Wyss (father)
- Writing career
- Notable works: Lyrics to Rufst du, mein Vaterland (1811); Editing The Swiss Family Robinson (1812)

Johann Rudolf Wyss (German pronunciation: [ˈjoːhan ˈruːdɔlf ˈviːs]; 4 March 1782 – 21 March 1830) was a Swiss author, writer, and folklorist who wrote the words to the former, unofficial Swiss national anthem Rufst Du, mein Vaterland in 1811, and also edited the novel The Swiss Family Robinson, written by his father Johann David Wyss, published in 1812.

== Biography ==
In 1805, Wyss became the professor of philosophy at Bern's academy. He later became the chief librarian of Bern's city library. Together with Gottlieb Jakob Kuhn, he edited the periodical Alpenrosen. He died in Bern.

== Works ==
- Vorlesungen über das höchste Gut ("Lectures on the highest good", 2 vols., Tübingen, 1811)
- Idyllen, Volkssagen, Legend und Erzählungen aus der Schweiz ("Idylls, folk tales, legends, and stories from Switzerland", 3 vols., 1815–22; partly translated into French in Mme. de Montolieu's Châteaux suisses, 1816)
- Reise im Berner Oberland ("Travels in the Bern highlands", 1808; French translation, Voyage dans l'Oberland bernois, 2 vols., Bern, 1817)
