= Oben am jungen Rhein =

National anthem of Liechtenstein

English: High on the young Rhine
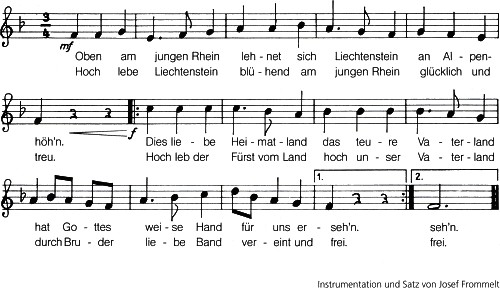
- National anthem of Liechtenstein
- Lyrics: Jakob Josef Jauch, 1850s
- Music: Derived from "God Save the King"
- Adopted: c. 1870 (official 1920; modified in 1963)

Audio sample
- U.S. Navy Band instrumental version (one verse): file; help

"Oben am jungen Rhein" (Note: German pronunciation: [ˈoːbən am ˈjʊŋən ˈʁaɪn]; lit. "High on the Young Rhine") is the national anthem of Liechtenstein. Written in the 1850s, it is set to the melody of the British anthem, "God Save the King", which in the 19th century had been used for a number of anthems of German-speaking nations, including those of Prussia, Bavaria, Saxony, and Switzerland.

== History ==
The original lyrics, beginning Oberst am jungen Rhein, were written in the 1850s. The song may be grouped with the German "Rhine songs", i.e. songs that celebrate the River Rhine as part of the German national patrimony, opposing the French territorial claims on the left river bank.

The text is attributed to Jakob Josef Jauch (1802–1859). Born in Saratov, Russia to Swiss Catholic family from Uri, Jauch studied theology in Lucerne and Chur during 1828–1832, and was consecrated as priest in 1833. He served as priest in London during 1837/8–1850. During 1852–1856, he lived in Balzers, Liechtenstein, and befriended Princess Franziska, with whom he planned a model educational institution in Balzers. Due to his progressive stance, Jauch came into conflict with the church hierarchy, and the bishop of Chur ordered him to leave Liechtenstein in 1856. If the attribution of the lyrics to Jauch is correct, the composition would likely date to Jauch's time in Balzers (1852–1856).

The lyrics were not published during Jauch's lifetime. They appeared in print, as the national anthem of Liechtenstein (Die Liechtenstein'sche National-Hymne) only after a period of oral transmission, in 1875, so that the tradition of Jauch's authorship, or the original form of his lyrics, cannot be verified. The song served as Liechtenstein's unofficial, de facto national anthem from the 1870s until its official adoption in 1920.

In 1963, the text was shortened, and reference to the "German Rhine", which had been introduced in the 1920 version, was removed. Oben am jungen Rhein is the only remaining national anthem sharing the same melody with the British "God Save the King" (since the replacement of the Swiss Rufst du, mein Vaterland in 1961).

== Lyrics ==
Usually, only the first and last stanzas are sung.

German original

Oben am jungen Rhein (Note: Originally Oberst am deutschen Rhein ('Highest on the German Rhine').)
Lehnet sich Liechtenstein
An Alpenhöh'n.
𝄆 Dies liebe Heimatland,
Das teure Vaterland (Note: Originally Im deutschen Vaterland ('In the German fatherland').)
Hat Gottes weise Hand
Für uns erseh'n. 𝄇

Wo einst St. Lucien
Frieden nach Rhätien
Hineingebracht
𝄆 Dort an dem Grenzestein
Und längs des jungen Rhein
Steht furchtlos Liechtenstein
Auf Deutschlands Wacht. 𝄇

Lieblich zur Sommerzeit
Auf hoher Alpenweid
Schwebt Himmelsruh:
𝄆 Wo frei die Gemse springt,
Kühn sich der Adler schwingt,
Der Senn das Ave singt
Der Heimat zu. 𝄇

Von grünen Felsenhöh'n
Freundlich es ist zu seh'n
Mit einem Blick:
𝄆 Wie des Rhein's Silberband
Säumet das schöne Land,
Ein kleines Vaterland
Von stillem Glück. 𝄇

Treu und fest, wenn schon klein
Im deutschen Reichsverein
Ruht Liechtenstein.
𝄆 Lichtvoll auf ew'gem Grund
Einig und kerngesund
In Sturm und Nacht dem Bund
Leuchtstern zu sein. 𝄇

Theilt nicht des Fürsten Herz
Väterlich Freud' und Schmerz
Mit Kindern hier?
𝄆 Nicht ihn erhält das Land —
So reichet ihm die Hand,
In unserm Vaterland
Vater und Zier! 𝄇

Hoch lebe Liechtenstein,
Blühend am jungen Rhein, (Note: Originally Blühend am deutschen Rhein ('Blossoming on the German Rhine).)
Glücklich und treu. (Note: Originally Glücklich und frei! ('Fortunate and free!').)
𝄆 Hoch leb' der Fürst vom Land,
Hoch unser Vaterland,
Durch Bruderliebe Band
Vereint und frei. 𝄇

IPA transcription (Note: See Help:IPA/German and German phonology.)

[ˈoː.bən am ˈjʊŋ.ən raɪ̯n |]
[ˈleː.nət zɪç ˈlɪç.tən.ˌʃtaɪ̯n |]
[an ˈal.pən.ˌhøːn ‖]
𝄆 [diːs ˈliː.bə ˈhaɪ̯.maːt.ˌlant |]
[das ˈtɔʏ̯.rə ˈfaː.tɐ.ˌlant |]
[hat ˈɡɔ.təs ˈvaɪ̯.zə hant]
[ˈfyːɐ̯ ʊns ɛɐ̯.ˈzeːn ‖] 𝄇

[voː aɪ̯nst zaŋkt ˈly.si̯ã |]
[ˈfriː.dən naːx ˈrɛː.ti̯ən |]
[hɪ.ˈnaɪ̯ŋ.gə.ˌbraxt ‖]
𝄆 [dɔɐ̯t an deːm ˈgrɛn.t͡sə.ˌʃtaɪ̯n |]
[ʊnt lɛŋs dɛs ˈjʊŋ.ən raɪ̯n |]
[ʃteːt ˈfʊɐ̯çt.loːs ˈlɪç.tən.ˌʃtaɪ̯n]
[aʊ̯f ˈdɔʏ̯t͡ʃ.lants vaxt ‖] 𝄇

[ˈliːp.lɪç t͡sʊɐ̯ ˈzɔ.mɐ.ˌt͡saɪ̯t |]
[aʊ̯f hoːɐ ˈal.pəɱ.ˌvaɪ̯t |]
[ʃveːpt ˈhɪ.məls.ˌruː ‖]
𝄆 [voː fraɪ̯ diː ˈgɛm.zə ʃprɪŋt |]
[kyːn zɪç deːɐ̯ ˈaːd.lɐ ʃvɪŋt |]
[deːɐ̯ zɛn das ˈaː.ve zɪŋt]
[deːɐ̯ ˈhaɪ̯.ma(ː)t t͡suː ‖] 𝄇

[fɔn ˈgryː.nən ˈfɛl.zən.ˌhøːn |]
[ˈfrɔʏ̯nt.lɪç ɛs ɪst t͡suː zeːn |]
[mɪt ˈaɪ̯.nəm blɪk ‖]
𝄆 [viː dɛs raɪ̯ns ˈzɪl.bɐ.ˌbant |]
[ˈzɔʏ̯.mət das ˈʃøː.nə lant |]
[aɪ̯n ˈklaɪ̯.nəs ˈfaː.tɐ.ˌlant]
[fɔn ˈʃtɪ.ləm glʏk ‖] 𝄇

[trɔʏ̯ ʊnt fɛst vɛn ʃoːn klaɪ̯n |]
[ɪm ˈdɔʏ̯.t͡ʃən ˈraɪ̯çs.fɛɐ̯.ˌʔaɪ̯n |]
[ruːt ˈlɪç.tən.ˌʃtaɪ̯n ‖]
𝄆 [ˈlɪçt.fɔl aʊ̯f ˈeːv.gəm grʊnt |]
[ˈaɪ̯.nɪç ʊnt ˈkɛɐ̯ŋ.gə.ˌzʊnt |]
[ɪn ʃtʊɐ̯m ʊnt naxt deːm bʊnt]
[ˈlɔʏ̯çt.ʃtɐn t͡suː zaɪ̯n ‖]

[taɪ̯lt nɪçt dɛs ˈfʏɐ̯.stən hɛɐ̯t͡s |]
[ˈfɛː.tɐ.ˌlɪç frɔʏ̯t ʊnt ʃmɛɐ̯t͡s |]
[mɪt ˈkɪn.dɐn hiːɐ̯ ‖]
𝄆 [nɪçt iːn ˈɛɐ̯.hɛlt das lant |]
[zoː ˈraɪ̯.çət iːm diː hant |]
[ɪn ˈʊn.zɐm ˈfaː.tɐ.ˌlant]
[ˈfaː.tɐ ʊnt t͡siːɐ̯ ‖] 𝄇

[hoːx ˈleː.bə ˈlɪç.tən.ˌʃtaɪ̯n |]
[ˈblyː.ənt am ˈjʊŋ.ən raɪ̯n |]
[ˈɡlʏk.lɪç ʊnt trɔʏ̯ ‖]
𝄆 [hoːx leːp deːr fʏɐ̯st fɔm lant |]
[hoːx ˈʊn.zɐ ˈfaː.tɐ.ˌlant |]
[dʊɐ̯ç ˈbruː.dɐ.ˌliː.bə bant]
[fɛɐ̯.ˈʔaɪ̯nt ʊnt fraɪ̯ ‖] 𝄇

English translation

High on the young Rhine
Lies Liechtenstein, resting
On Alpine heights.
𝄆 This beloved homeland
The dear fatherland
God's wise hand has
Chosen for us. 𝄇

Where once St. Lucius
Peace to Raetia
Brought,
𝄆 There by the border stone
And along the young Rhine
Liechtenstein stands fearless
On guard for Germany. 𝄇

Lovely in the summer
On the high Alps' meadows
Floats heavenly quietude.
𝄆 Where the chamois leaps freely,
The eagle soars boldly,
The herdsman sings the Ave
For the native land. 𝄇

From green rocky heights
It is lovely to look at
With one gaze:
𝄆 How the Rhine's silver band
Hems the beautiful land
A small fatherland
Of silent bliss. 𝄇

Loyal and firm, even if small
In the German Empire association
Rests Liechtenstein.
𝄆 Full of light on eternal ground
United and healthy
In storm and night the union
to be a shining star. 𝄇

Does the prince's heart not share
Fatherly joy and pain
With children here?
𝄆 The country is not receiving him —
So give him your hand
In our fatherland
father and ornament! 𝄇

Long live Liechtenstein,
Blossoming on the young Rhine,
Fortunate and faithful!
𝄆 Long live the Prince of the Land,
Long live our fatherland,
Through bonds of brotherly love
United and free! 𝄇

== See also ==
- God Save the King#Use elsewhere
  - "Heil dir im Siegerkranz"
  - "Rufst du, mein Vaterland"
  - "Bevare Gud vår kung"
- "Die Wacht am Rhein"
