= Saint Vincent, Land So Beautiful =

National anthem of Saint Vincent and the Grenadines

- National anthem of Saint Vincent and the Grenadines
- Lyrics: Phyllis Joyce McClean Punnett, 1967
- Music: Joel Bertram Miguel, 1967
- Adopted: 1979

Audio sample
- U.S. Navy Band instrumental version (one verse and chorus): file; help

"Saint Vincent, Land So Beautiful" is the national anthem of Saint Vincent and the Grenadines. The song was first performed in 1967 and was adopted as the national anthem upon independence from the United Kingdom in 1979. The lyrics were written by Phyllis Joyce McClean Punnett and the music by Joel Bertram Miguel.

== Lyrics ==
I
Saint Vincent, Land so beautiful
With joyful hearts we pledge to thee
Our loyalty and love and vow
To keep you ever free.

Chorus:
What e'er the future brings,
Our faith will see us through.
May peace reign from shore to shore,
And God bless and keep us true.

II
Hairoun, Our fair and blessed Isle,
Your mountains high, so clear and green,
Are home to me, though I may stray,
A haven, calm, serene.

Chorus

III
Our little sister islands are
Those gems, the lovely Grenadines,
Upon their seas and golden sands
The sunshine ever beams.

Chorus
