= Rufst du, mein Vaterland =

1848–1961 national anthem of Switzerland

English: Call'st Thou, My Fatherland?
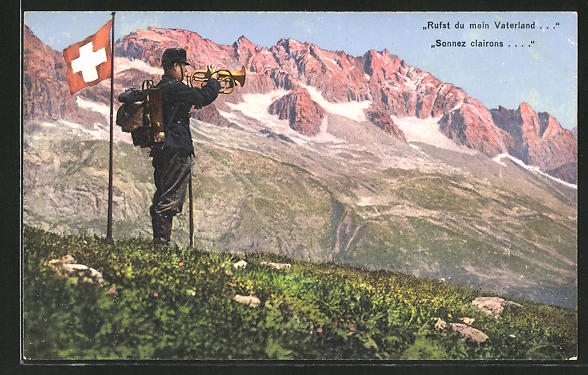
- A 1914 postcard containing the opening line
- Unofficial national anthem of Switzerland
- Also known as: Ô monts indépendants (English: Oh Independent Mountains)
- Lyrics: Johann Rudolf Wyss (Henri Roehrich), 1811 (1857)
- Music: Unknown composer (the melody of "God Save the King", 18th century)
- Adopted: c. 1848
- Relinquished: 1961
- Succeeded by: Swiss Psalm

Audio sample
- "Rufst du, mein Vaterland": file; help

"Rufst du, mein Vaterland" (Swiss Standard German: [ˈruːfst duː maɪn ˈfaːtərˌland]; "Call'st Thou, My Fatherland?") is a Swiss patriotic song. It had the status of de facto national anthem from the formation of Switzerland as a federal state in the 1840s, until 1961, when it was replaced by the Swiss Psalm.

The text was written in 1811 by Bernese philosophy professor Johann Rudolf Wyss, as a "war song for Swiss artillerymen". It is set to the tune of the British national anthem "God Save the King" (c. 1745), a tune which became widely adopted in Europe, first as the German hymn "Heil, unserm Bunde Heil" (August Niemann, 1781), somewhat later as "Heil dir im Siegerkranz" (Heinrich Harries 1790, originally with Danish lyrics, the German adaptation for use in Prussia dates to 1795), and as anthem of the United States, "My Country, 'Tis of Thee" (1831).

"Rufst du, mein Vaterland" short instrumental
The short instrumental rendition of "Rufst du, mein Vaterland".

"Rufst du, mein Vaterland" vocal
The vocal rendition of "Rufst du, mein Vaterland" performed by the Swiss Army Central Band in the 1940s.

"Rufst du, mein Vaterland" short vocal
The short vocal rendition of "Rufst du, mein Vaterland" performed by the Swiss Army Central Band in the 1940s.

In Switzerland during the 1840s and 1850s, the hymn was regularly sung at patriotic events and at political conventions. It is referred to as "the national anthem" (die Nationalhymne) in 1857, in the contest of a "serenade" performed for general Guillaume Henri Dufour. The Scottish physician John Forbes, who visited Switzerland in 1848, likewise reports that the tune of 'God Save the King' "seems to be adopted as the national anthem of the Swiss also".

As in the American "My Country, 'Tis of Thee", the lyrics replace the image of the monarch with that of the fatherland, and the promise to defend it "with heart and hand" (mit Herz und Hand), the "hand" replacing the "voice" praising the king of the original lyrics. The pact to defend the homeland militarily is made explicit in the first verse,

Rufst du, mein Vaterland? Sieh uns mit Herz und Hand; All dir geweiht! Heil dir, Helvetia! Hast noch der Söhne ja, Wie sie Sankt Jakob sah, Freudvoll zum Streit!	Do you call, my Fatherland? See us with heart and hand All devoted to you! Hail to you, Helvetia! You still has sons, Like they saw Sankt Jakob, Joyfully hasten to the battle.

The German lyrics were translated into French in 1857, as the result of a competition sponsored by the Societé de Zofingue of Geneva. The competition was won by Henri Roehrich (1837– 1913), at the time a student of philosophy, whose text is less explicitly martial than the German lyrics, beginning Ô monts indépendants / Répétez nos accents / Nos libres chants "O free mountains / echo our calls / our songs of liberty" and comparing the Rütli Oath with a Republican liberty tree.

Yet in spite of the Republican sentiment in the lyrics, the tune remained more strongly associated with royalism and conservativism, and it remained the anthem of the British, the German and the Russian empires. This fact, and the lack of association of the tune with Switzerland in particular, led to the desire to find a replacement, which came in the form of the Swiss Psalm (composed 1841), from 1961 as a provisional experiment, and since 1981 permanently.

== Lyrics ==
=== German ===
The poem by Wyss was first printed in 1811 in a collection of "war songs" (Kriegslieder), under the title of Vaterlandslied für Schweizerische Kanonier ("patriotic song for Swiss artillerymen"). The original poem as printed in 1811 had six verses. From as early as 1819, Wyss' fifth verse was lost, with two final verses added, for a total of seven verses. The first of the added verses makes reference to William Tell, and the second one invokes the rewards of peace after war (while in the original version, the final two verses compare the report of artillery and the impact of canister shot to thunder and avalanches, respectively).

The 1819 version is under the title of "war song for Swiss defenders of the fatherland" (Kriegslied für schweizerische Vaterlandsvertheidiger). It does not credit Wyss, and indicates the tune as that of "God save the king, etc." In this particular version, Wyss' reference to the Battle of St. Jakob an der Birs is replaced by reference to the Battle of Laupen, because of the immediate context of the publication, dedicated to a commemoration of this latter battle. Similarly, an 1825 variant inserts reference to the Battle of Dornach.

A version printed in 1833 in a collection of traditional and patriotic songs gives the title An das Vaterland ("To the Fatherland"), with the tune identified as that of "Heil! unserm Bunde Heil!".

The following gives the original text of the 1811 version alongside the text of the full seven verses as current in the 1830s. Abridged versions of the lyrics as used in the role of national anthem often reduce the text from seven to three verses, giving either verses 1, 2, 6 or alternatively 1, 3, 6 (as numbered below). Since the hymn never had official status, there are slight textual variants even between these surviving verses. A version printed in 1867, well after the song had become established as de facto national anthem, still gives five verses, omitting only verses 4 and 5 (as numbered below).

German lyrics (1811)	German lyrics (1833)	Literal translation	Poetic translation
Ruf'st du, mein Vaterland? Sieh' uns mit Herz und Hand; All dir geweiht! Heil, o Helvetia! Noch sind der Männer da, Wie sie Sanct Jakob sah, Freüdig zum Streit!	1. Rufst du, mein Vaterland?; Sieh uns mit Herz und Hand; All dir geweiht! Heil dir, Helvetia! Noch sind der Söhne da, Wie sie Sankt Jakob sah, Freudvoll zum Streit!	Do you call, my Fatherland? See us with heart and hand All devoted to you! Hail to you, Helvetia! You still have sons, Like they saw Sankt Jakob, Joyfully hasten to the battle.	Call'st thou, my Fatherland? See us with heart and hand Vowed to thee, all! Helvetia! hail to thee! True still thy sons shall be, Like them Saint James did see, Leap at war's call!
Ja, wo der Alpen Kreis; Nicht dich zu schützen weiß O Schweizerland! Steh'n wir, den Alpen gleich, Nie vor Gefahren bleich, Froh noch im Todesstreich, Für's Vaterland.	2. Da, wo der Alpenkreis; Nicht dich zu schützen weiss Wall dir von Gott, Stehn wir den Felsen gleich, Nie vor Gefahren bleich, Froh noch im Todesstreich, Schmerz uns ein Spott.	There where the circle of the Alps; Does not protect you, Rampart made by God, There we stand like rocks, Never turn pale, facing the danger, Happy even in the lethal stroke, Agony a jest to us.	There where no Alpen-bound; Circling thy land around, God's hand hath thrown, Steadfast we stand alike, Blenching not, mountain-like, Still, even though death should strike, Scorning to groan.
Hegst uns so mild und treu, Zeihst uns so stark und frey, O du mein Land! Lust drum, am Tag der Noth, Sey uns für dich der Tod, Wenn dir Verderben droht, Du theures Land!	3. Nährst uns so mild und treu, Hegst uns so stark und frei, Du Hochlands Brust! Sei denn im Feld der Not, Wenn Dir Verderben droht, Blut uns ein Morgenrot, Tagwerks der Lust.	You nourish us mild and true, Raise us so strong and free, You highland's bosom! So be then in the field of danger, When destruction threatens you, Blood us a dawn Labour of joy.	
Still ruht der Alpensee, Hoch an der Gletscher Schnee; — So wir im Land! Wild tobt er aufgeschreckt, Wenn ihn Gewitter deckt; — So wir, zum Kampf geweckt, Für's Vaterland!	4. Sanft wie der Alpensee, Sturmlos am Gletscherschnee; Weht unser Mut. Graus tobt der See geschreckt Wenn ihn Gewitter deckt; So wir zum Kampf erweckt: Wut wider Wut.	Gentle like the alpine lake, Stormless on the glacial snow Our courage moves. Dreadfully the lake rages, startled, When thunderstorm covers it, So do we, when awakened to the battle, Rage against rage.	
Laut wie der Donner grollt, Wenn er im Sturme rollt Durch's Alpenland! — So der Geschosse Wuth, Wenn deiner Feinde Brut; Trotzt mit verwegnem Muth, O Vaterland!
Wie der Lavinen Fall; Stürzt von der Felsen Wall; Furchtbar ins Land: Stürze Kartätschen-Saat; Rings auf der Alpen Pfad, Wenn dir ein Dränger naht, Mein Vaterland!	5. Und wie Lawinenlast; Vorstürzt mit Blitzeshast –; Grab allumher – Werf in den Alpenpfad, Wenn der Zerstörer naht, Rings sich Kartätschensaat; Todtragend schwer.	And like avalanche's load Crashes down with the speed of lightning – all around a tomb – May into the alpine path, When the destroyer advances, Canister shell's seed be thrown all around Fatally heavy.	
	6. Frei und auf ewig frei, Ruf' unser Feldgeschrei, Hall' unser Herz! Frei lebt, wer sterben kann, Frei, wer die Heldenbahn; Steigt als ein Tell hinan. Nie hinterwärts!	Free, forever free! may this be our battle cry, may this echo in our hearts! Free lives, who is ready to die, Free, who unto the hero's path ascends like Tell, Never moving backwards!	Free and for ever free! This shall our war-cry be— Heart's cry — for ever! Free lives who dreads not death, Free, who the hero's path Tell-like upmounted hath, Falteringly never!
	7. Doch, wo der Friede lacht Nach der empörten Schlacht; Drangvollem Spiel, O da viel schöner, trau'n, Fern von der Waffen Grau'n, Heimat, dein Glück zu bau'n Winkt uns das Ziel!	But where peace smiles, After the raging battles Crowding game; O, there be more beautiful in store, Far from the weapon's horror Home, to build your fortune, Be our goal!	

=== French ===
The 1857 French version by Henri Roehrich (1837– 1913) has four verses, which are not direct translations of the German text.

French lyrics	IPA transcription (Note: See Help:IPA/French, French phonology and Swiss French.)	English translation
Ô monts indépendants, Répétez nos accents, Nos libres chants. A toi patrie, Suisse chérie, Le sang, la vie De tes enfants.	[o mɔ̃ ɛ̃.de.pɑ̃.dɑ̃] [ʁe.pe.te no ak.sɑ̃] [no libʁ ʃɑ̃] [a twa pa.tʁi] [sɥis ʃe.ʁi] [lə sɑ̃ la vi] [də tɛ ɑ̃.fɑ̃]	O independent mountains, Repeat our words, our free songs. To you, fatherland, Dear Switzerland, The blood and the life of your children.
Nous voulons nous unir, Nous voulons tous mourir Pour te servir. Ô notre mère ! De nous sois fière, Sous ta bannière Tous vont partir.		We want to unite, We all are ready to die At your service O our mother! Be proud of us, Under your banner We all will leave.
Gardons avec fierté L'arbre au Grutli planté La liberté ! Que d'âge en âge, Malgré l'orage, Cet héritage Soit respecté.		Let us guard with pride The tree planted in Grütli, The freedom! From generation to generation, In spite of the storm, This heritage Is respected.
Tu soutins nos aïeux, Tu nous rendra comme eux, Victorieux ! Vers toi s'élance Notre espérance, La délivrance Viendra des cieux.		You supported him our ancestors You make us like them, Victorious! To you rushed Our hope The issue will come of heaven.

=== Italian ===
Towards the end of the 19th century, when the song's status as de facto national anthem had become fixed, it was desirable to have a singable version in Italian, the third official language of Switzerland (Romansh was not officially recognized as a separate language until 1938). An Italian version printed in a 1896 songbook for schools has two verses, a close translation of the first two versions of the German lyrics.

Italian lyrics	IPA transcription (Note: See Help:IPA/Italian, Italian phonology and Swiss Italian.)	English translation
Ci chiami, o Patria? Uniti impavidi snudiam l'acciar! Salute, Elvezia! Tuoi prodi figli, Morat, San Giacomo, non obliar.	[t͡ʃi ˈkjaːmj‿o ˈpaːtrja] [uˈniːt(i)‿imˈpaːvi.di] [znuˈdjan latˈt͡ʃar] [saˈluːt(e)‿elˈveːt͡sja] [ˈtwɔi̯ ˈprɔːdi ˈfiʎ.ʎi] [moˈra san ˈd͡ʒaːko.mo] [non oˈbljar]	Are you calling us, o fatherland? United and fearless we unsheathe the sword! Hail, Helvetia! Your brave sons, Murten, St. Jacob, do not forget!
Laddove è debole dell'Alpi l'egida che il ciel ci diè, ti farem argine dei petti indomiti: è dolce, o Elvezia, morir per te!	[ladˈdoːv(e)‿ˈɛ ˈdeːbo.le] [delˈlal.pi ˈleːd͡ʒi.da] [ke‿i̯l ˈt͡ʃel t͡ʃi ˈdjɛ] [ti faˈrem ˈar.d͡ʒi.ne] [dei̯ ˈpɛt.t(i)‿inˈdɔːmi.ti] [ˈɛ ˈdol.t͡ʃe o elˈveːt͡sja] [moˈrir per ˈtɛ]	Where is weak the Alps' aegis that heaven gave us, we'll make your bank by indomitable chests: it is sweet, o Helvetia, to die for you!
Ma quando l'Angelo di pace assidesi sui nostri allor, soletta Elvezia, l'arti e l'industrie, oh, quanto apprestano nuovo splendor!	[ma ˈkwan.do ˈlan.d͡ʒe.lo] [di ˈpaːt͡ʃe asˈsiːde.zi] [swi ˈnɔːstrj‿alˈlɔr] [soˈlɛt.ta elˈveːt͡sja] [ˈlar.tj‿e linˈduːstrje] [o ˈkwan.to apˈprɛːsta.no] [ˈnwɔːvo splenˈdor]	But when the Angel of peace sits on our laurels, lone Helvetia, your arts and your industries, oh, will prepare new splendor!

=== Romansh ===
Romansh original	English translation
E clomas, tger paeis, iglis ties unfants baleis an grevs cumbats. Nous suandagn gugent igl ties appel gugent cugl Spiert e cor valent digls antenats.	
Ma noua tg’igl rampar n’at pò betg ple tgirar, è igl Signour. Sot sia protecziun, davaint’igl pour liun, stat aint cun persvasiun per noss’onour.	
O tger paeis an flour, a tè nous dagn santour an pietad. Tè lainsa onorar igl ties cunfegn salvar, defender segl rampar la libertad.	
