= Swiss Army Central Band =

Military band that is part of the Swiss Army

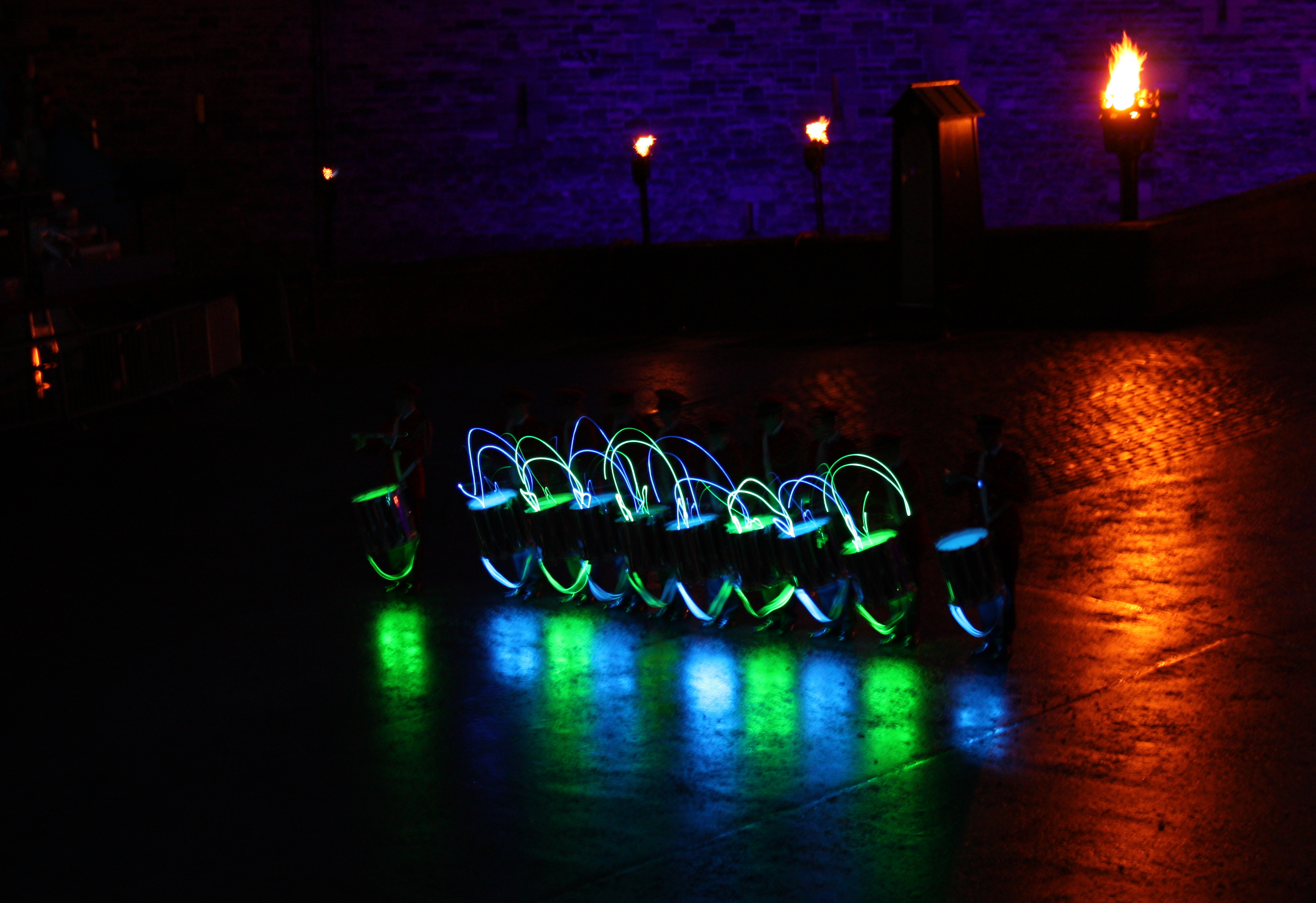
Members of the Swiss Army Central Band drumline during the 2009 Edinburgh Military Tattoo.

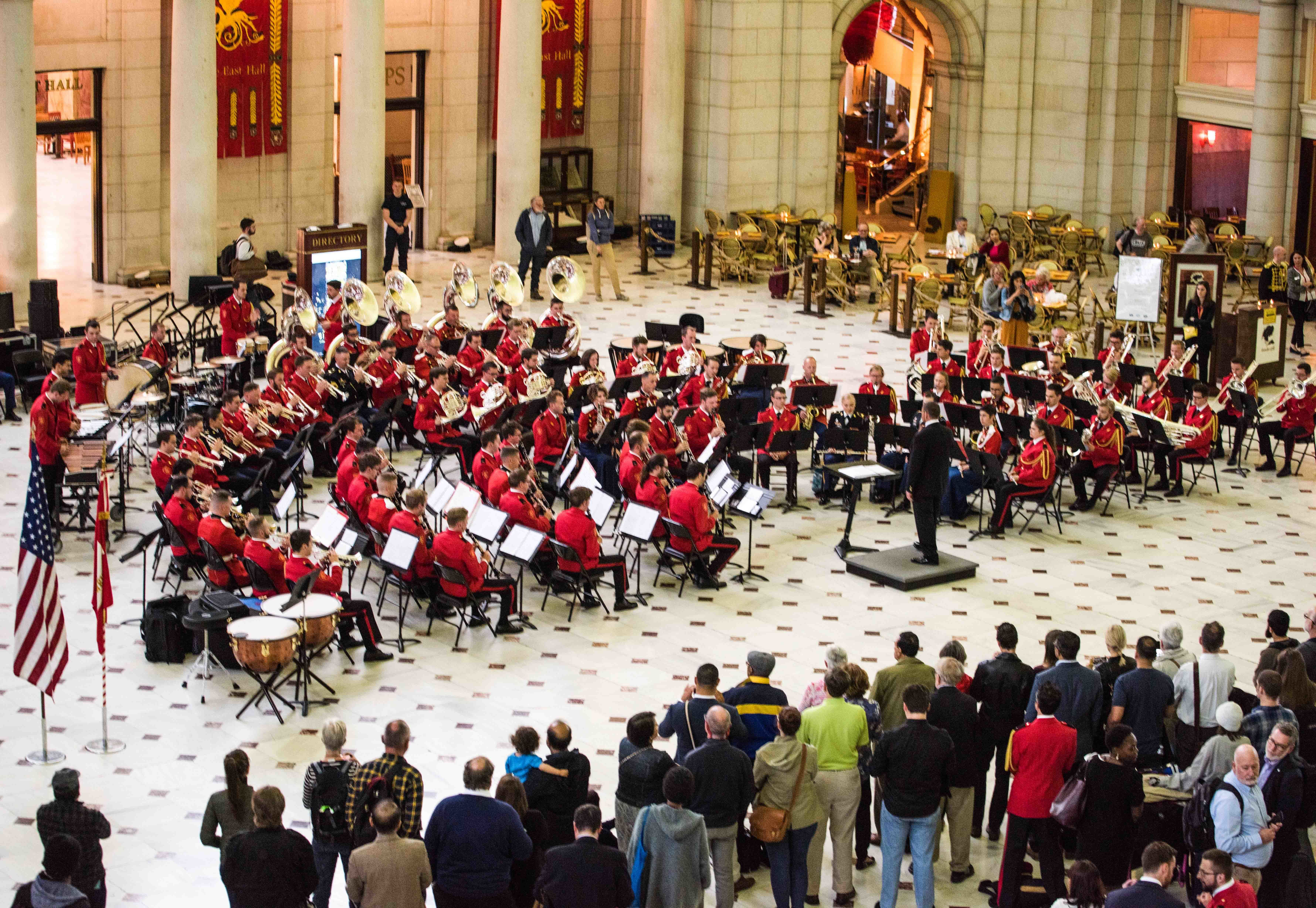
Soldiers band with the Old Guard Fife and Drum Corps and the United States Marine Band at Union Station in Washington, D.C., on 29 April 2019.

The Swiss Army Central Band (French: Musique centrale de l'armée suisse, German: Repräsentationsorchester Schweizer Armeespiel, Italian: Banda centrale dell'esercito svizzero) is a military band that is part of the Swiss Army and the representative band of the Swiss Armed Forces. It is part of the Military Music Competence Center (Kompetenzzentrum Militärmusik). It is based on mostly German and French, but also modern British influences. It consists of 80 musicians who every year send a delegation abroad to introduce Swiss Military Music to the world. In recent years, the band visited military tattoos in Argentina, Brazil, Greece, China, Finland South Korea, Singapore, New Zealand and the United States. Events around the world have included the Spasskaya Tower Military Music Festival and Tattoo, the Norwegian Military Tattoo and the Virginia International Tattoo. The band is the primary host and participant of the Basel Tattoo.

It is currently under the direction of Major Aldo Werlen and Drum Major Staff Adjutant Philipp Rütsche. Swiss international euphonium soloist Thomas Rüedi was a soloist in the band from 1996 to 2003. The band performs in its distinctive red uniform.

== See also ==
- Staff Band of the Bundeswehr
- French Republican Guard Band
- Gardemusik Wien
- Italian Army Music Band
