= Matata (disambiguation) =

Matatā is a town in New Zealand.

Matata may also refer to:

== New Zealand ==
- Mātātā, Māori name for New Zealand fernbird
- Mātātā, Māori name for Rhabdothamnus solandri, a shrub

== Other places ==
- Matata, Eswatini
- Matata, Ermera Municipality, East Timor

== Other uses ==
- Matata (band), a former African rock and funk band
- Matata (music group), a Kenyan-Norwegian music group
- Matata, a religious figure associated with the history of Adjara, a province of Georgia
- Kanzi or Matata, a bonobo featured in several studies on great ape language
- The latter part of the Swahili phrase hakuna matata (translates: no problem)

== See also ==
- Hakuna Matata (disambiguation)
  - "Hakuna Matata" (song)
  - Hakuna matata (wasp)
  - Hakuna Matata Restaurant, Disneyland Paris
- Afrika (video game), known in south-east Asia as "Hakuna Matata"
