= Hakuna Matata (disambiguation) =

"Hakuna matata" is a Swahili language phrase from East Africa, meaning "no trouble".

Hakuna Matata may also refer to:

- Hakuna matata (wasp), species of chalcid wasp from the family Eulophidae
- "Hakuna Matata" (song), 1994 song from Disney's animated film The Lion King
- Hakuna Matata Restaurant, restaurant in Disneyland Park, Paris, France
- Hakuna Matata, or Afrika (video game), 2008 video game

== See also ==
- Matata (disambiguation)
