= Indiana Jones Summer of Hidden Mysteries =

2008 Disneyland event

The "Indiana Jones Summer of Hidden Mysteries" was an event held at Disneyland by Walt Disney Creative Entertainment during the summer months of 2008. This was a promotional tie-in with the release of Indiana Jones and the Kingdom of the Crystal Skull. The summer-long event included a new show, changes to the Jungle Cruise attraction and appearances by a live actor playing Indiana Jones.

There was some controversy about the Secret of the Stone Tiger stage show playing at Aladdin's Oasis, in which Indiana Jones is seen punching a female villain. Following a news story in the Orange County Register, the show was altered to remove the punch.

== Events ==
=== The Jungle Cruise ===
The Disneyland attraction Jungle Cruise was given an Indiana Jones overlay, featuring 5 artifacts from the Indiana Jones films. The Life Preserver from the CORONADO, the Ark Crate, Henry's Umbrella, Mola Ram's Headdress, and a carving of the Crystal Skull were all "lost" in the jungle for explorers to relocate, except the Life Preserver which still remains to this day on the "Danger" dock.

=== Secret of the Stone Tiger ===
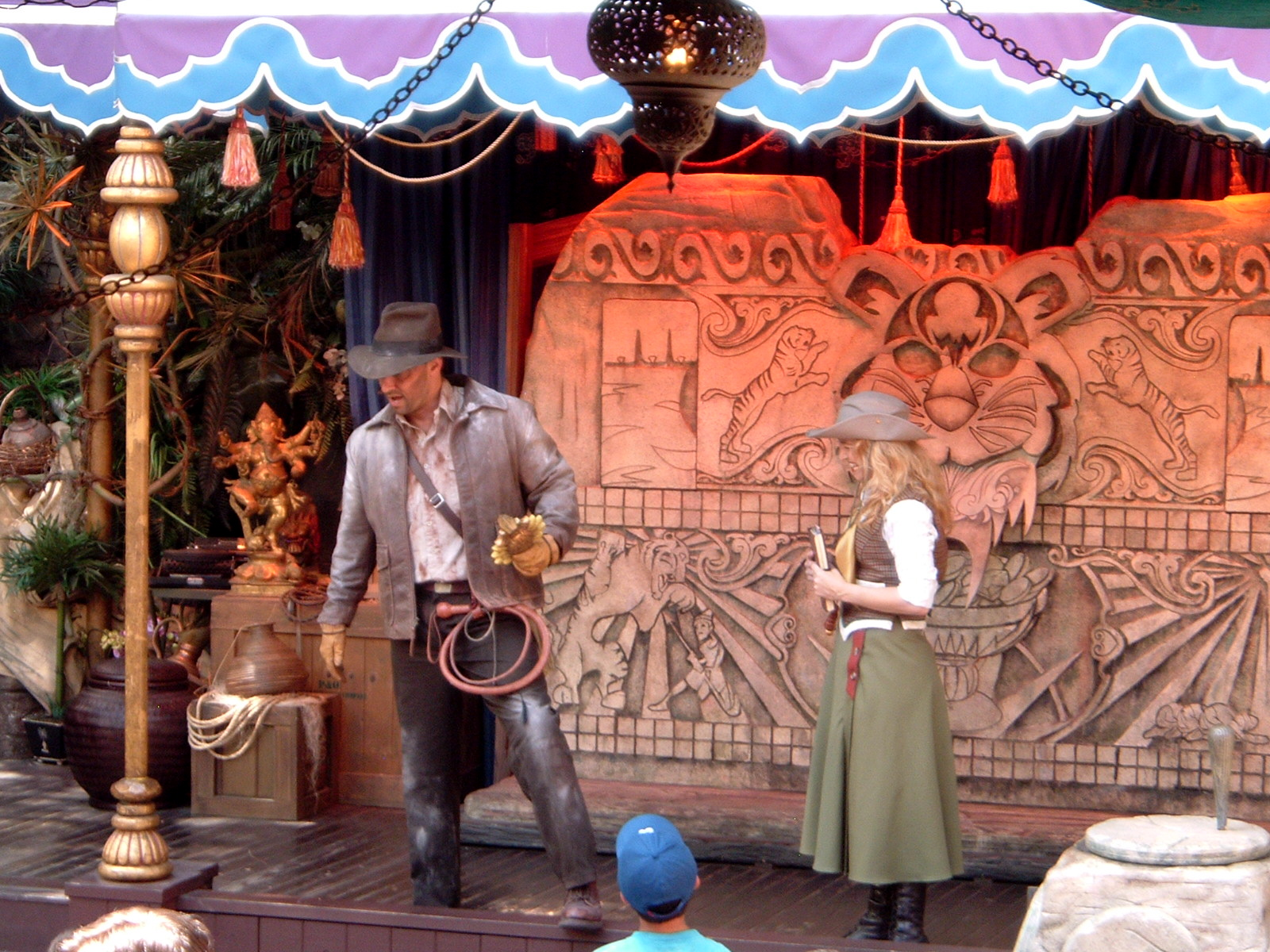

The Aladdin's Oasis storytelling show was also given an Indiana Jones overlay, becoming the Secret of the Stone Tiger stage show. The show featured a female archaeologist named Rachel Flannery, who was hot on the trail of a Golden Idol in the shape of a tigers head. This idol was said to give its owner unlimited power. In the search for the idol, Rachel follows several clues that have been left behind in Indiana Jones' journal. In her quest, she calls for several young volunteers to assist her. Children from the audience then come onto the stage and assist in the discovery of clues. After the final clue is revealed, the Stone Tiger begins to roar and Dr. Jones emerges from its mouth. Indy quickly hands the Golden Idol to Rachel as he begins to tell a tale to the children. However, Rachel fits the Golden Idol onto a staff and is overcome with its power. After a series of punches, kicks, and whip cracks, Rachel falls into the Stone Tiger's mouth. Indy quickly gathers his belongings and rushes off to locate an old map, supposedly leading him to the nearby Temple of Mara.

=== Random Acts of Indy ===
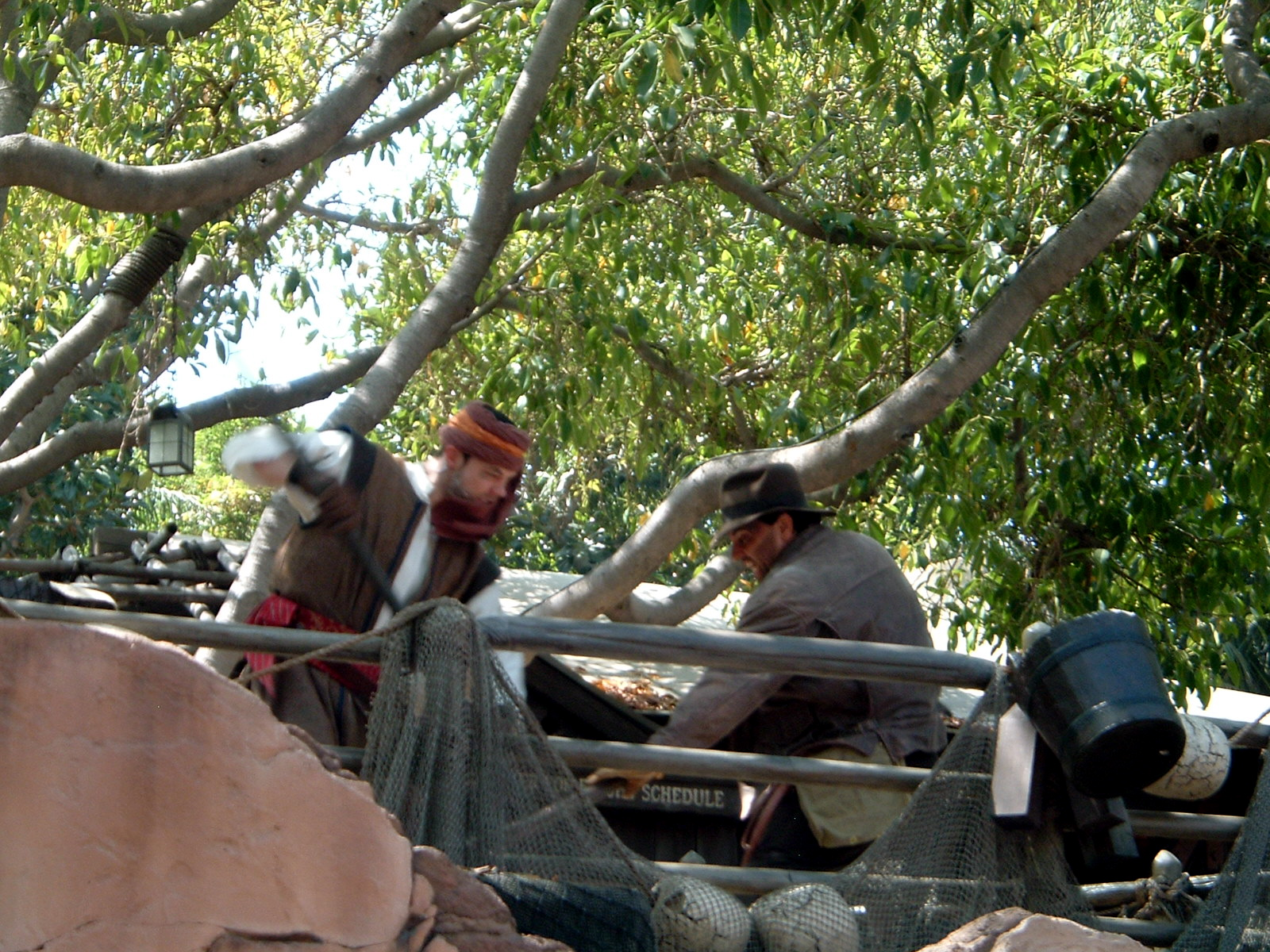

Shortly after the Secret of the Stone Tiger show, Indy would emerge into the crowded streets of Adventureland, first on the rooftop of Jungle Cruise. Indy would then encounter a Desert Hawk where shortly thereafter a fight would ensue. Once Indy knocks the villain out, he would often look into the crowd say, "When he wakes up, tell him Indy won!" Indy would then run through the streets of Adventureland, in search for the mysterious temple. Needing to get "higher up," Indy would then run up the stairs and end up on the roof of the Adventureland Bazaar. The Desert Hawk would soon be on his trail, and another fight would follow. Apparently, somewhere in that second fight, the Desert Hawk would get the map. In the third and final battle, now taking place on Tarzan's Treehouse, Indy would chase the Desert Hawk, trying to get the map back. The two would have their showdown on the suspension bridge that hung over the Adventureland/New Orleans Square path, similar to the climactic confrontation between Indy and Mola Ram in Temple of Doom. Indy would then use his whip to get the map from the Desert Hawk's hand. Finally, Indy would take off running through Adventureland once again.

== Reception ==
After an article analyzing the male-on-female violence seen at Disneyland in the Orange County Register, the show was quickly altered. Indy would no longer throw any direct punches at the woman, he would simply dodge.

The Indiana Jones Summer of Hidden Mysteries was directed by Senior Show Director Glenn Kelman, who was also behind the short lived Jack Sparrow's Swashbuckling Adventure on Pirate's Lair on Tom Sawyer Island.
