= Explorers Club (disambiguation) =

The Explorers Club is an organization formed to further general exploration.

Explorers Club may also refer to:

- Etheric Explorers Club, fictional London society featured in a series of short stories by Paul Marlowe
- Explorers Club (band), progressive rock band
- Explorers' Club of Bangladesh
- Explorers Club Restaurant, a restaurant located in Disneyland Paris
- The Explorers Club (band), pop rock band
- Underwater Explorers Club
- South American Explorers
- The Explorers Club (play), a 2013 play by Nell Benjamin
