= Spyglass Hill =

Spyglass Hill may refer to:

- Spyglass Hill Golf Course, Monterey Peninsula, California, U.S.
- Spyglass Hill, on the fictional Treasure Island
  - Spyglass Hill, Norman Island, associated with Piracy in the British Virgin Islands, a possible inspiration for the name
- Spyglass Hill, in Adventure Isle (Disneyland Paris), France
