= Jungle Cruise =

Boat ride at Disney theme parks

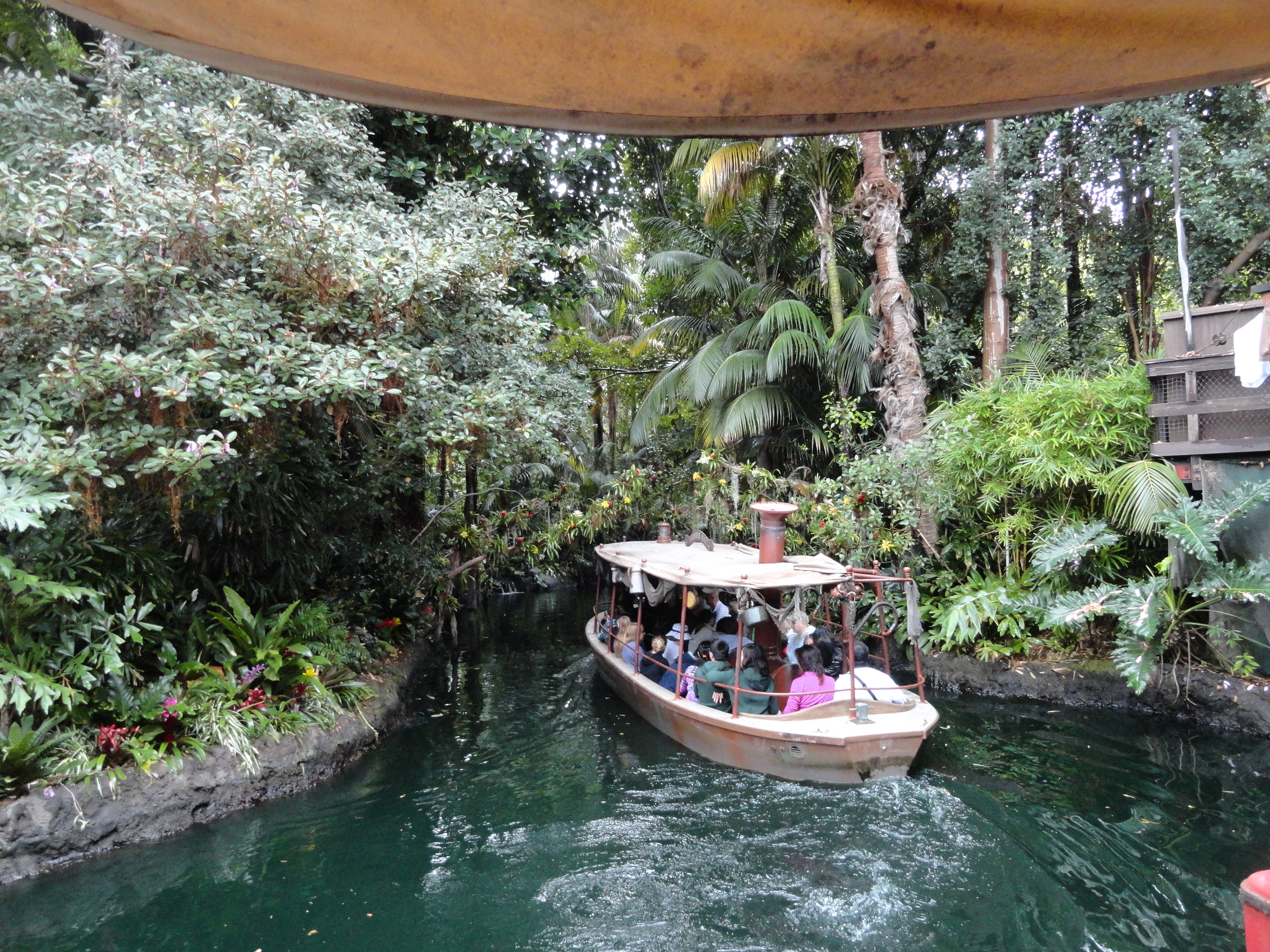
- Jungle Cruise at Disneyland

Disneyland
- Area: Adventureland
- Status: Operating
- Opening date: July 17, 1955; 71 years ago

Magic Kingdom
- Area: Adventureland
- Coordinates: 28.41798429°N 81.58344193°W
- Status: Operating
- Opening date: October 1, 1971; 55 years ago

Tokyo Disneyland
- Name: Jungle Cruise: Wildlife Expeditions
- Area: Adventureland
- Status: Operating
- Opening date: April 15, 1983; 43 years ago (original); September 8, 2014; 12 years ago (Wildlife Expeditions)
- Closing date: January 6, 2014; 12 years ago (original)

Hong Kong Disneyland
- Name: Jungle River Cruise
- Area: Adventureland
- Status: Operating
- Opening date: September 12, 2005; 21 years ago

General statistics
- Type: Tow boat ride
- Designer: Walt Disney Imagineering
- Capacity: 1,800 riders per hour
- Duration: 7 minutes
- Sponsor: ENEOS (Tokyo Disneyland)
- Lightning Lane available at Magic Kingdom
- Wheelchair accessible

Jungle Cruise, formally named Jungle River Cruise, and currently named Jungle Cruise: Wildlife Expeditions, is a riverboat amusement ride located in the Adventureland themed section at various Disney theme parks worldwide. The attraction is a simulated riverboat cruise that travels along a waterway using a concealed guidance system through areas with Asian, African, and South American themes. Park guests board replica steam launches from a 1930s British explorers' lodge, and Audio-Animatronic exotic animals are displayed throughout the ride. A live Disney cast member acts as a tour guide and boat skipper that loosely follows a rehearsed script, providing passengers with a comedic narrative.

The first installation of the ride was featured at Disneyland for its grand opening in 1955. A variety of changes were made over the years, including enhanced audio effects, updates to the storyline, and the removal of culturally-insensitive material. The installation at Hong Kong Disneyland features a significantly different storyline from the other parks and provides guests with three different language options, each with its own line queue. Following years of planning and delays, a film adaptation of the ride was released in the United States on July 30, 2021.

== Inspiration and design ==
The project was planned by Disney to incorporate a jungle-themed ride into the list of attractions featured at Disneyland's grand opening in 1955. Sources of inspiration include a 1955 documentary called The African Lion from the True Life Adventures film series, as well as the 1951 adventure film The African Queen. Disney Imagineer Harper Goff referenced The African Queen frequently in his ideas and drew inspiration from the steamer depicted in the film for the ride vehicle design.

Bill Evans was the Imagineer responsible for landscaping Disneyland and most of Walt Disney World. During the development of Jungle Cruise, he was given the somewhat complicated task of creating a realistic jungle on a limited budget. In addition to importing actual tropical plants, he incorporated "character plants" which have an exotic appearance despite not being exotic. He had used a well-known trick of uprooting local orange trees and replanting them upside-down, growing vines on the exposed roots.

The ride's water clarity, known as turbidity, is controlled in a manner that obscures the boat's guidance system and other undesirable items like perches and mechanized platforms of the bathing Audio-Animatronic elephants and hippos. The waterway was originally dyed brown but was later changed to other colors: first to a green hue and later to a bluish-green. When water returns to the attraction, it travels through a 37 inches (0.94 m) diameter underground pipe before it can be used again. The waterway depth is approximately 5 feet (1.5 m) and circulates southward from the northern end of Frontierland's Rivers of America to Fantasyland. The path of the ride takes riders past Frontierland's entrance and into Adventureland, where it drifts alongside the Tiki Room, before re-entering Jungle Cruise near the ride's exit. The 1,920-foot (590 m) waterway was later shortened and re-routed in 1994.

Although Goff and Evans can be credited with the creation and initial design of the ride, animator Marc Davis – recognized for his work on venerable attractions such as The Haunted Mansion and Pirates of the Caribbean – added his own style in later versions. The "Indian Elephant Bathing Pool" and "Rhinoceros Chasing Explorers up a Pole" were among his contributions.

== Disneyland ==
The attraction was in the opening day roster of the park, and has remained open and largely unchanged in theme and story since then. The original plan was to use real animals, but these plans were abandoned once Disney realized that the animals would likely sleep during the day. Aside from alterations and maintenance changes, four completely new show scenes have been added to date. In 1994, the river channel was rerouted to make way for the queue buildings and entrance courtyard of the Indiana Jones Adventure.

While the ride's comedic spiel is filled with intentionally bad puns by the skipper, the original intent of the ride was to provide a realistic, believable voyage through the world's jungles, wanting to be informational and educational. The original spiel was similar to the narration of a nature documentary. According to Behind the Attraction, it's theorized that when Walt Disney overheard a guest wanting to skip the ride because they had already ridden it before, Disney talked to Marc Davis asking what could be improved to the ride. Davis responded, saying that the ride needed humor, later saying that Disneyland needed to be a place "where people would come in and look at something and actually laugh out loud. There wasn't really anything of that nature there". Davis created the concept art for the modern gags within the ride, helping to overhaul the ride to its current state.

=== Attraction summary ===
The queue and station are themed as the headquarters and boathouse of the Jungle Navigation Company, a river trading company located in a British colony (as shown by the Union Jack flying above the boathouse) circa 1938. The queuing area is cluttered with appropriate props, such as pinned insects, an old radio on top of a bookshelf, an old typewriter, and a chessboard with miniature animals and decorated shotgun shells replacing the pieces. The extended queue winds upstairs and then downstairs again. Big band music from the 1920s, 1930s and 1940s plays overhead, punctuated by jungle-themed news bulletins, helping to reinforce the setting and threading together the show scenes and boat.

Once aboard the boats, guests are introduced to their skipper and they head into the jungle, allegedly never to return. The first rivers simulated are the Irrawaddy and Mekong rivers, representing tropical Southeast Asia. The boats sail through a dense rainforest inhabited by large butterflies and a pair of toucans, before passing by the Temple of the Forbidden Eye and a shrine of a cobra beholding a crystal ball. Passengers then glide precariously under the first of a pair of stone arches severely damaged by an earthquake centuries ago. These are part of the ruins of an ancient Cambodian city where a crumbling temple is one of the few things which have managed to avoid tumbling into the river. Here, passengers see an Indochinese tiger, giant spiders, king cobras and mugger crocodiles. Passing a statue of a bowing elephant, the boats pass under the second arch and enter the Sacred Indian Elephant Bathing Pool. Here, a large herd of Indian elephants frolic and squirt water at the passing vessels.

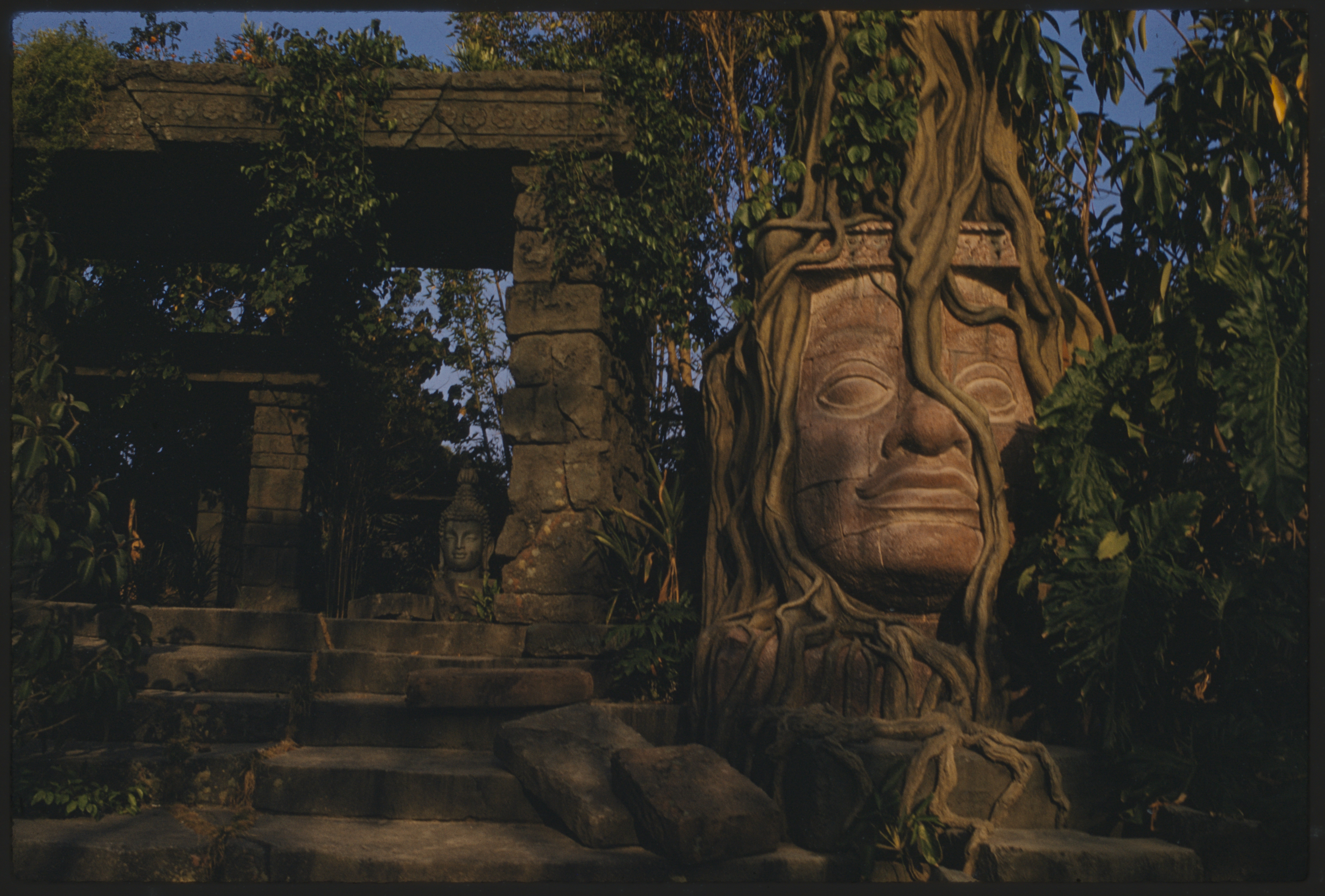
A segment of the ride in August 1962

The theme moves to the rivers of Africa: here riders see a family of baboons and a safari camp that has been overrun by gorillas. The boats narrowly avoid the dramatic waterfall, Schweitzer Falls (which riders are told is named after Dr. Albert Falls), and turn down Africa's Nile River where they pass between two African bush elephants, and large termite mounds. A tableau of the African Veldt follows, showing giraffes, wildebeest, zebras, vultures and gazelles; then a pride of lions feasting on a zebra beneath a rocky outcropping. Beyond the lion's den, an angry black rhinoceros has chased a safari party up a tree, much to the amusement of spotted hyenas. The skipper then pilots the boat into the Congo River spotting the wreckage of a boat that has sunk while also disturbing a pod of hippos that signal their intent to attack the boat. The skipper will then grab a prop gun and shoot it into the air, scaring away the hippos. It is currently unknown what makes the loud gunshot type sound but it is known it is not a live or dead round since laws prevent it.

Drums and chanting are heard as the boats enter through the Congo and end up in a place called "Head-Hunter Country". Guests can spot another boat being taken over by chimpanzees as they raid the boat of its supplies and accessories. The boats then pass by more chimpanzees who have raided the box of butterflies.

The boats now pass behind Schweitzer Falls (referred to as "the Backside of Water", which they call "the Eighth Wonder of the World") to enter the Amazon River. Skeletal animal remains and warning signs featuring pictures of dagger-toothed fish forewarn the next show scene, where the boats encounter a swarm of leaping piranha. The guests then pass a couple of water buffalo and a boa constrictor. The boats then finally pass by a former lost and found stand which has been transformed by Trader Sam to become Trader Sam's Gift Shop.

=== Boats ===
There are 12 vehicles, with a maximum of 9 in operation at any given time (8 with guests and 1 training vehicle). The boats in 1955 were painted as clean, idealized replicas, but have since been given a more realistic theming reflecting the grunge and wear of actual watercraft due to the addition of Indiana Jones Adventure and its ruggedness. Names in use:

- Amazon Belle (Renamed "Jingle Belle" during Christmas)
- Congo Queen (Renamed "Congo Caroler" then "Candy Cane Queen" during Christmas)
- Ganges Gal (Renamed "Ganges Garland" then "Gingerbread Gal" during Christmas)
- Hondo Hattie (Renamed "Hondo Hollie" then "Hanukkah Hattie" during Christmas)
- Irrawaddy Woman (Renamed "Irrawaddy Snowwoman" during Christmas)
- Kissimmee Kate (Renamed "Yule Kissimmee" then "Kissimmee Under the Mistletoe" during Christmas)
- Nile Princess (Wheelchair Accessible Vehicle) (Renamed "Nile Nutcracker" then "Noel Nellie" during Christmas)
- Orinoco Adventuress (Renamed "Orinoco Ornament" then "Navidad Adventuress" during Christmas)
- Suwannee Lady (Renamed "Suwannee Sleigh" then "Sugar Plum Lady" during Christmas)
- Ucayali Una (Wheelchair Accessible Vehicle) (Renamed "Ucayali Eggnog" then "Evergreen Una" during Christmas)
- Yangtze Lotus (Renamed "Yuletide Lotus" during Christmas)
- Zambezi Miss (Renamed "Peppermint Miss" during Christmas)

Names decommissioned in 1997:

- Magdalena Maiden
- Mekong Maiden

== Magic Kingdom ==
The Walt Disney World Jungle Cruise is set as a depression-era British outpost on the Amazon River, operated by the fictional company, The Jungle Navigation Co., whose advertisement poster is painted on the wall near the exit of the attraction. Albert Awol's broadcast is different from that of Disneyland's, being ride specific. Also unlike Disneyland, the queue never extended to a second level.

Near the Hippo Pool, a piece of a downed airplane can be seen along the shoreline. This is the back half of the Lockheed Model 12 Electra Junior previously found at The Great Movie Ride at Disney's Hollywood Studios in the Casablanca scene.

Landscape architect Bill Evans selected plants for the attraction that could withstand Florida's climate, particularly its relatively cool winters. The plants were also chosen to create the appearance of a tropical equatorial jungle.

A Jungle Cruise themed restaurant, the Skipper Canteen, opened in December 2015 and expanded on the Jungle Navigation Co. storyline, making Dr. Albert Falls into the founder of the company in 1911, with his granddaughter Alberta Falls taking charge of the Navigation Company and the Jungle Cruise in the 1930s.

=== Queue ===
The queue of the Jungle Cruise is heavily themed with period artifacts, tools, gear, photos and more. It is intended to resemble a colonial outpost where an exploration of the jungle rivers may be booked. It is divided into four main sections which may be opened or closed in sequence to accommodate crowd fluctuation. The queue was designed to wind about extensively so that guests may see all of the different artifacts in the queue. The most notable section of the queue is the office of Albert Awol.

=== Attraction summary ===
The skipper welcomes the boat full of guests down the tropical rivers of the world. The ride starts out in the Amazon River, where the passengers encounter butterflies with one-foot wingspans, or as the skipper might say, twelve inches. The boat then passes Inspiration Falls, which transitions into the Congo River in Africa.

The boat passes by a beach with a shop named "Boats & Baits and Bites", and then passes an African rock python. The boat then passes a camp that has been raided by western gorillas, which transitions the cruise into the Nile River.

After encountering two African elephants, the boat passes along the African Veldt, riders see numerous African animals including giraffes, gazelles, vultures, wildebeests, and zebras watching a pride of lions feasting on a zebra beneath a rocky outcropping. The boat then passes a lost safari group that has been chased up a pole by an angry black rhinoceros and are now trapped and surrounded by spotted hyenas. The group then passes by a pair of Nile crocodiles and another waterfall, Schweitzer Falls (which riders are told is named after Dr. Albert Falls), and heads past the remains of a plane crash. The boat then encounters a pool of hippos, about to charge the boat until the skipper scares them off. The boat passes by another boat being raided of its supplies by chimpanzees, and then proceeds into the Mekong River.

After encountering mugger crocodiles, they enter a temple that has been destroyed by an earthquake. Inside, some king cobras, monkeys, spiders, and a Bengal tiger can be found. After they exit, they come across an elephant bathing pool where numerous Indian elephants are relaxing in the water. The cruise concludes after the boat narrowly avoids being sprayed by water from one of the elephants.

==== Boats ====
There are 15 vehicles, with a maximum of 9 in operation at any given time.

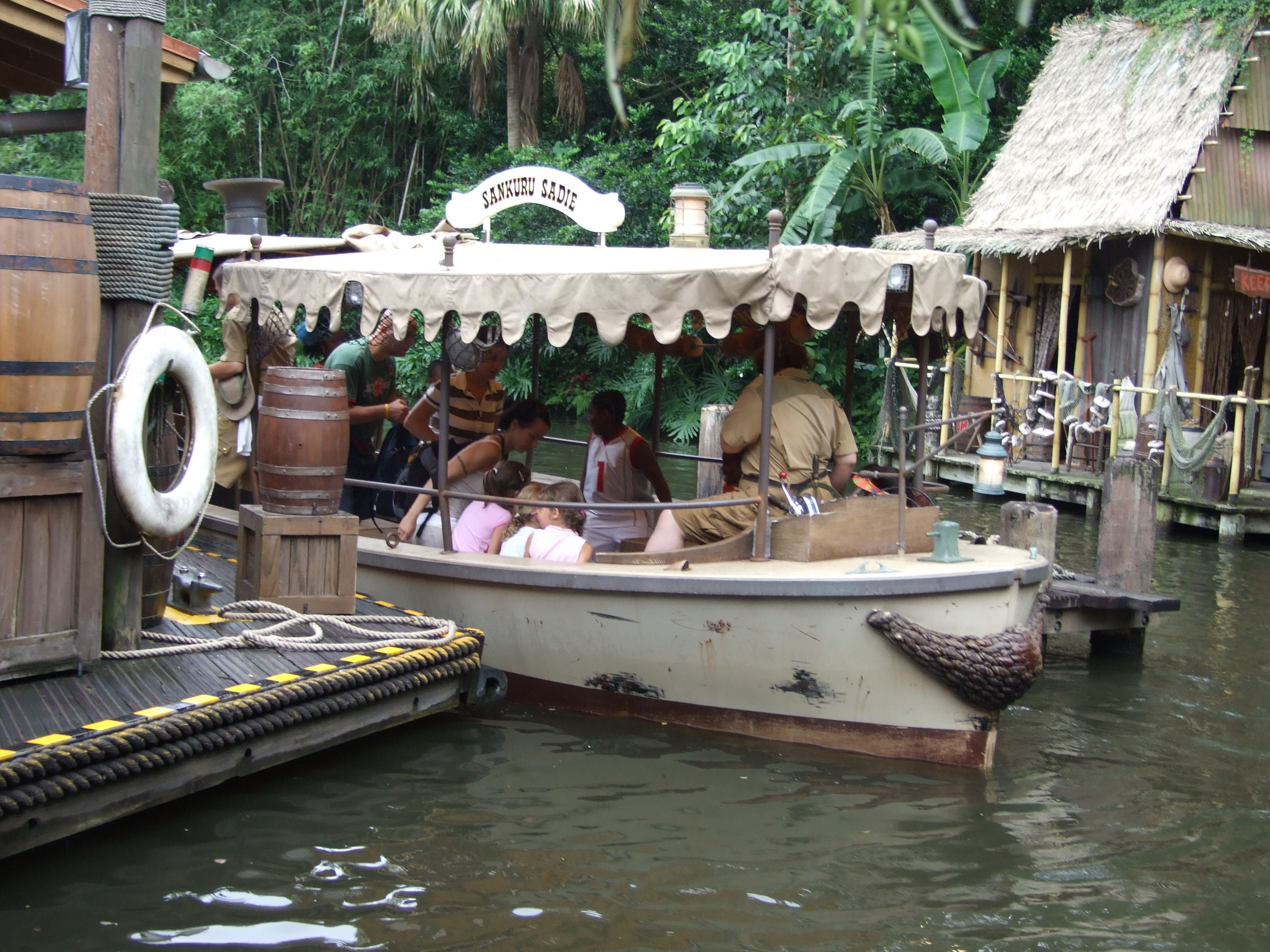
The Sankuru Sadie is one of two boats in the Magic Kingdom's fleet to have ever sunk.

- Amazon Annie (Renamed "Eggnog Annie" during Christmas)
- Bomokandi Bertha (Wheelchair lift equipped) (Renamed "Brrrrr Bertha" during Christmas)
- Congo Connie (Renamed "Candy Cane Connie" during Christmas)
- Ganges Gertie (Renamed "Garland Gertie" during Christmas)
- Irrawaddy Irma (Renamed "Icicle Irma" during Christmas)
- Mongala Millie (Renamed "Mistletoe Millie" during Christmas)
- Nile Nellie (Renamed "Noel Nellie" during Christmas)
- Orinoco Ida (Renamed "Orino-cocoa Ida" during Christmas)
- Rutshuru Ruby (Renamed "Reindeer Ruby" during Christmas)
- Sankuru Sadie (Renamed "Sleigh Ride Sadie" during Christmas)
- Senegal Sal (Renamed "Poinsettia Sal" during Christmas)
- Ucayali Lolly (Renamed "Yule Log Lolly" during Christmas)
- Volta Val (Renamed "Vixen Val" during Christmas)
- Wamba Wanda (Wheelchair lift equipped) (Renamed "Wassail Wanda" during Christmas)
- Zambezi Zelda (Renamed "Fruitcake Zelda" during Christmas)

Retired boats

- Kwango Kate (Retired in 2000)

== Tokyo Disneyland ==
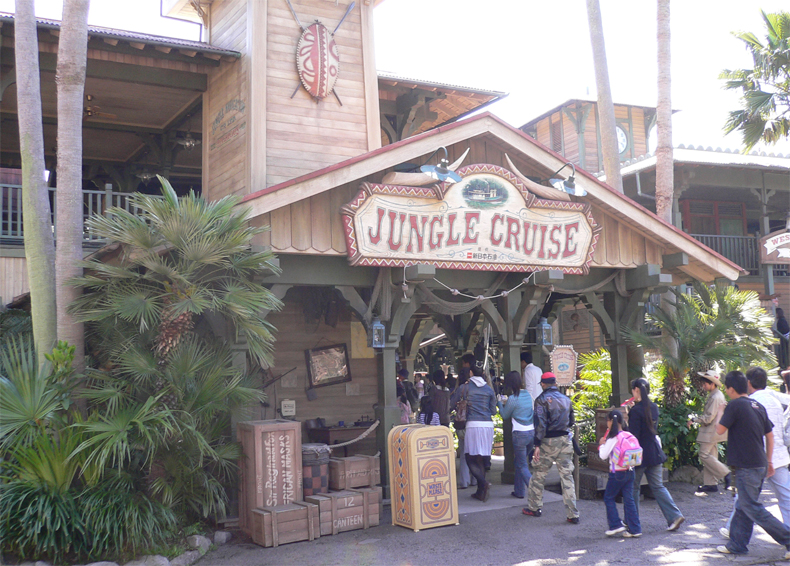
Jungle Cruise in Tokyo Disneyland shares a station complex with the Western River Railroad.

The Magic Kingdom and Tokyo Disneyland attractions are very similar to each other, with the exception of a few minor differences. While the boats in the Magic Kingdom's attraction travel counter-clockwise, the boats at Tokyo Disneyland travel in a clockwise direction.

In Tokyo Disneyland, the station and surrounding area are themed to a more upscale African city, as opposed to an isolated jungle outpost. This version shares a station building with the park's steam train ride, Western River Railroad. The spiels in Tokyo Disneyland are delivered in Japanese.

In 2014, the ride was revamped and renamed Jungle Cruise: Wildlife Expeditions as being the second renovations of the ride, since it was announced that the first renovations of the ride was temporarily closed for refurbishment. This new version contains unique special effects and background music.

=== Boats ===
There are 13 vehicles, with a maximum of 12 in operation at any given time.

All boat names, except Orinoco Ida, are alliterations.

- Amazon Annie
- Ganges Gertie
- Irrawaddy Irma
- Kwango Kate
- Mekong Maiden
- Nile Nelly
- Orinoco Ida
- Rutshuru Ruby
- Sankuru Sadie
- Senegal Sal
- Volta Val
- Wamba Wanda
- Zambezi Zelda

Retired boats

- Congo Connie (Retired in 2020)

== Hong Kong Disneyland ==
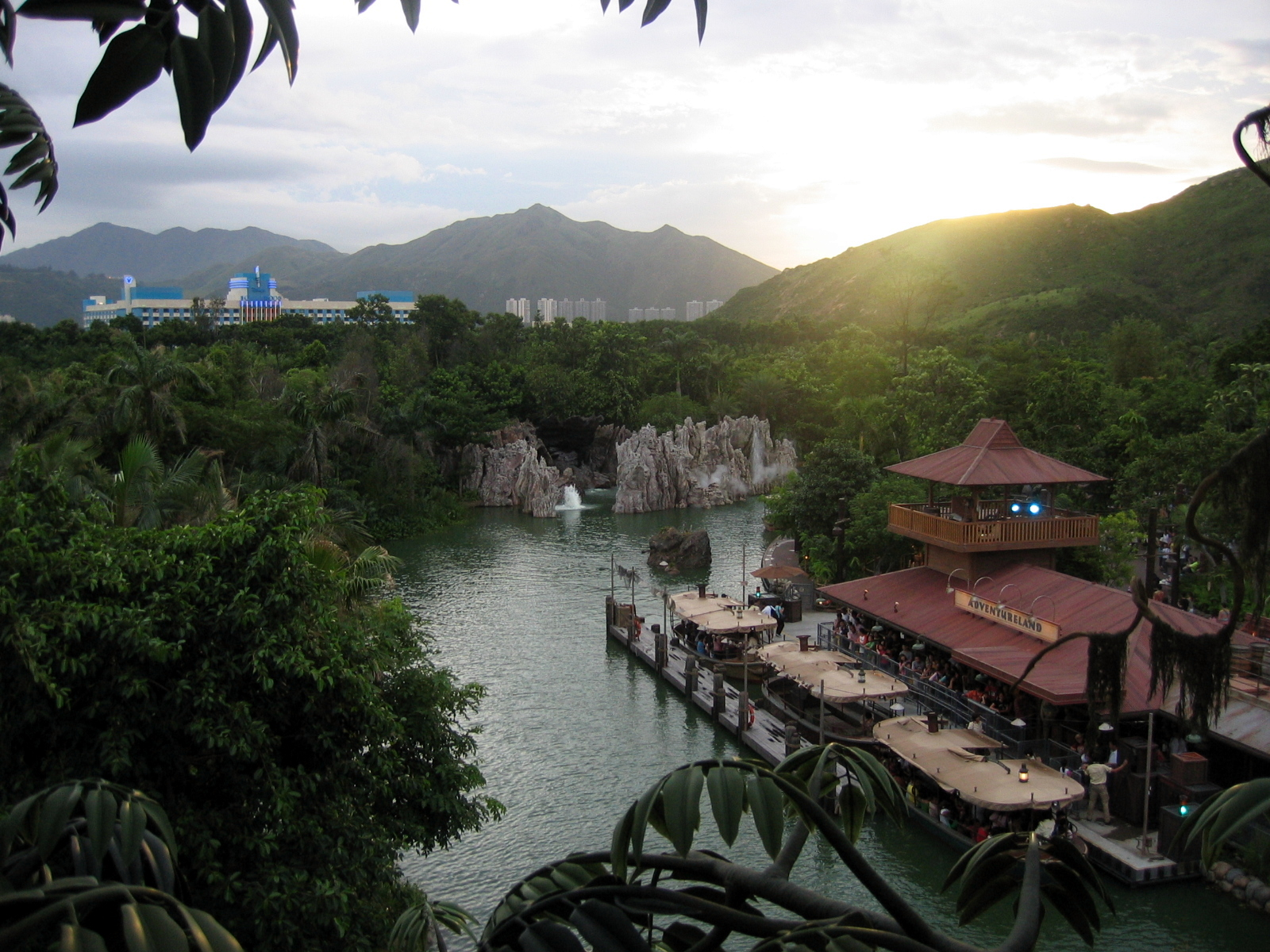
Jungle River Cruise at Hong Kong Disneyland

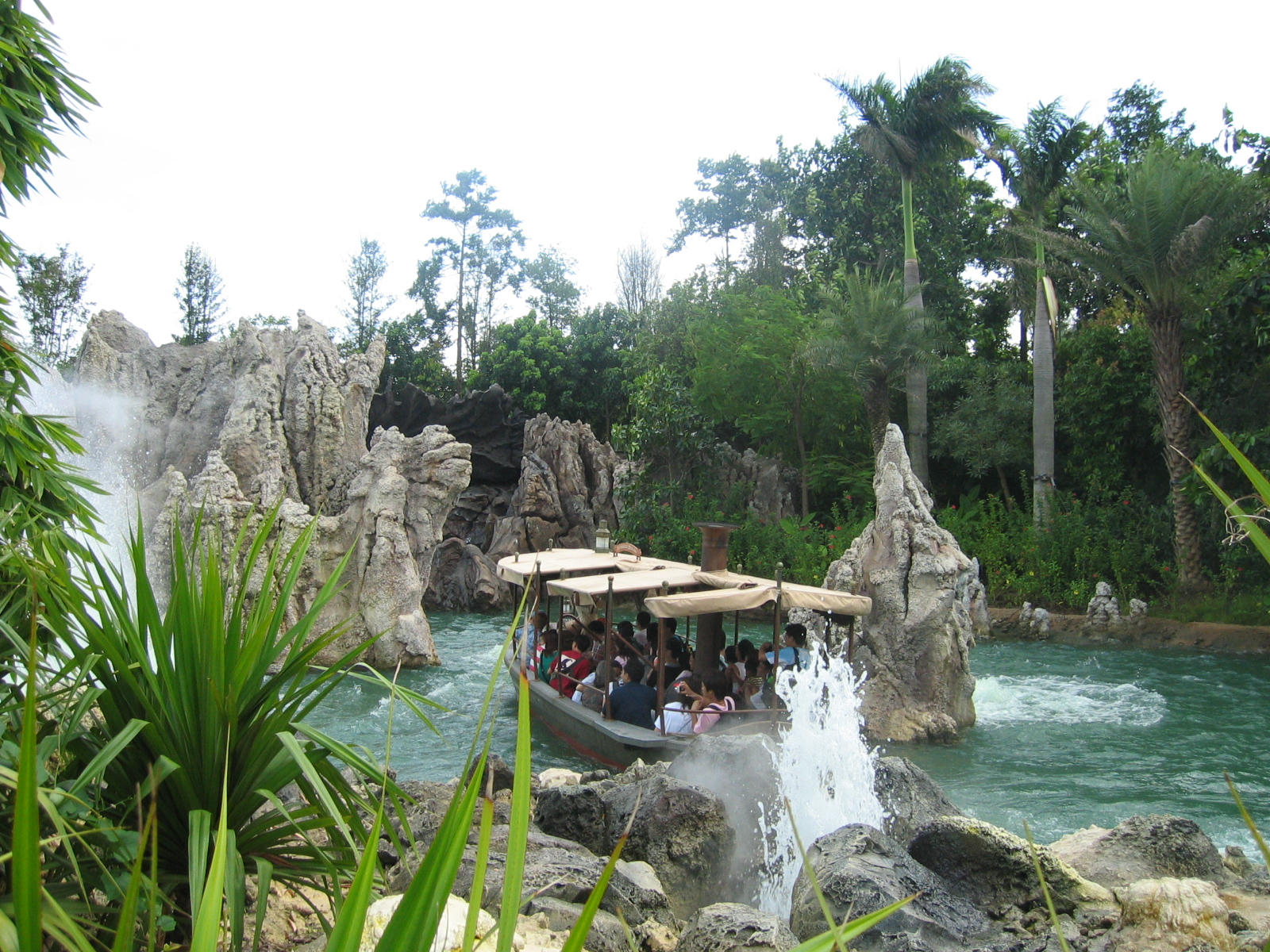
Fire god sets and a water bomb

The shape of Hong Kong Disneyland's route is significantly different compared to the others, and circumnavigates Tarzan's Treehouse. A grand finale is included with a battle between angry fire and water gods. Three languages are regularly available: Cantonese, English, and Mandarin. Each language has a separate queue, allowing visitors to experience the journey in their preferred language. This has however been removed at an unknown date, as there is now only one queue for all languages, while this attraction takes guests on a tour of Rivers of Adventure, as a similar to Rivers of America at Disney Parks around the world.

In 2024, the three languages have been merged into a single script and one queue. The overall script remains similar, but the languages alternate between lines.

=== Attraction summary ===
The queue takes place in a small boathouse of The Jungle Navigation Co. that is less elaborate than the boathouses found at the other parks. After winding through the queue, guests board one of the boats and meet their skipper who speaks either English, Cantonese, or Mandarin, which are the official languages of Hong Kong.

The boats then depart and head down the river, past Tarzan's Treehouse, where the skipper tells guests to wave goodbye to the guests traversing the treehouse, for they will never see them again. The boats then drift past an Indian elephant and her calf playing in the water, followed by another elephant showering in a waterfall. A large bull Indian elephant emerges from the water squirting a plume of water at the boats with the guests narrowly avoiding the free shower.

The vessels then drift down a narrow stream past ancient Cambodian ruins which have been claimed by the jungle. Giant spiders and king cobras watch the boats as they move on. Up ahead several crocodiles are seen resting on a small beach, while a school of hungry piranha are jumping in the hopes of attacking the guests. The boats escape into Africa and pass a large safari camp where several curious gorillas have discovered clothes, guns, hammocks, and books, as the "Trashin’ the Camp" song from Tarzan plays on a nearby 1930s radio. The African Veldt comes into view, where antelope, giraffes, zebras, and African elephants stare at the boats. The vessels then drift into a small pool where a pod of hippos try to tip the boat. Several feet ahead a rhino is seen chasing a safari group up a tree while several hyenas look on laughing.

Skulls and cloth impaled on broken bamboo sticks appears as tribal drums and horns fill the air. The skipper tells guests that they have entered head hunter country and must quietly sneak by. The boats slowly pass through the main village, where several upright shields rest in the tall grass. A native notices the boats and all the shields now revealed to have head hunters behind them begin firing spears and poison darts at the boats as they narrowly escape into a rocky canyon. In the rocky canyon, the boats stop near two unusual rock formations that look like faces, revealed by the skipper to be the fire god and the water god who constantly feud over their differences. The fire god sets the river ablaze while the water god vomits a water bomb, causing the flames to die and the whole canyon to become a cloud of steam. The boats escape the canyon and pass a baby elephant before returning to the boathouse.

==== Boats ====
There are 9 vehicles, with a maximum of 8 in operation at any given time.

- Amazon Annie
- Congo Queen (Wheelchair accessible)
- Ganges Gal (Wheelchair accessible)
- Irrawaddy Irma
- Lijiang Lady
- Mekong Maiden
- Nile Nellie
- Yangzi Ying Ying
- Zambezi Zelda

== Albert Awol ==
Albert Awol is a fictional Jungle Cruise boat captain and disc jockey for the Disney Broadcasting Company. Considered the "Voice of the Jungle", he broadcasts everything from news, to quizzes, reminders, weather, etc. on the DBC (Disney Broadcast Company). He also serves as a period disc jockey for the station, filling the airwaves with music from the 1930s depression era.

Albert Awol was added in 1991 to the Jungle Cruise during a refurbishment. According to one report:

Standing in the Jungle Cruise queue was a somber affair prior to the aforementioned 1991 rehab; once guests crossed the threshold they were faced with a series of twists and turns that led past bare walls, their fellow guests and occasional glimpses of the river. There was no background music at that time either, so if the queue was full it promised a fair amount of shuffling drudgery. Of course DL's Jungle Cruise queue is now closer to the full embodiment of how cool a ride's waiting space can be, but Florida's 1991 upgrade did include queue music interspersed with radio commentary by Albert AWOL, "the voice of the jungle". A considerable array of visual enhancements were also made at that same time, from a series of new destination-based wall murals to the artifact-laden "office" in the center of the queue.

Albert's broadcast is projected not just over the Jungle Cruise queuing area, but over Adventureland as a whole, setting the time period. In Disneyland, Albert is replaced by "Jungle Radio". Various air personalities comment on the environment, the luminaries who are in the area (including references to the designers of the attraction – Harper Goff, Bob Mattey, Winston Hibler [True-Life Adventure films, upon which Jungle Cruise is based]). The music is a good deal slower in pace and tempo than the tracks used at Walt Disney World. The music was previously linked with the outdoor speakers at the Temple of the Forbidden Eye (Indiana Jones Adventure), however, two separate tracks of material with similar tone and some songs now exist. The Jungle Radio at Disneyland does connect the setting with the nearby Indiana Jones attraction, and ties in announcements that reference Indiana Jones and the temple in which the ride is set.

== Major changes ==
Throughout the history of the attraction, Jungle Cruise has undergone many technical changes, as well as some story and content adaptations.

In March 2001, ride skippers at Disneyland were "disarmed" of their pistols and no longer fired shots at animals during the ride. The skippers were rearmed in October 2004. In 2010, with the environment having undergone fifty-five years of growth and care, Disneyland's man-made jungle was declared to be "real" thanks to its own self-sustaining ecosystem.

In the 2013 Holiday season, an overlay called the "Jingle Cruise" began running at the Jungle Cruise attractions at Disneyland Resort and the Magic Kingdom. This overlay included new decorations on the boathouse, Christmas lights on the boats, and a holiday-themed script, but few changes to the jungle itself. In 2014, the "Jingle Cruise" overlay returned, but with significant changes. Unlike the previous year, the boats and boathouse had few decorations, but the show scenes became themed. The script was rewritten to reflect a story of lost holiday supplies in the jungle. 2015's holiday overlay continued in the vein of 2014's, but added a new scene with giant snowmen.

In January 2016, the Disneyland attraction underwent a four-month refurbishment and reopened in May. This included a new dock designed to stabilize the boats while loading and unloading, as well as some mechanical animal repairs, replacement of the on-ride audio systems, and tree replacement.

In January 2021, Disney announced one of the most major refurbishments of the attraction. In response to increasing scrutiny of Disney attractions, the attraction's final scene of tribal people would be removed in the spirit of removing "negative depictions of native people". These scenes would then be replaced in both the Disneyland and Magic Kingdom versions of the ride. Despite previous reports that the attraction would now include or reference content from the 2021 film adaptation, these new refurbishments will only include the removal of "imperialist" and "racist" content. The updated storyline emphasizes the re-imagined Trapped Safari characters consisting of Felix Pechman XIII, the unlucky skipper; Siobhan "Puffy" Murphy, an Irish ornithologist; Leonard Moss, a Black Canadian botanist; Kon Chunosuke, a Japanese entomologist in the Society of Explorers and Adventurers; and Rosa Sota Dominguez, a Latina artist, with the remains of their boat and supplies being taken over by a group of chimpanzees.

== In popular culture ==
- In a Disney Sing Along Songs video volume called Disneyland Fun, the Jungle Cruise ride makes an appearance during "Following the Leader", a song from the 1953 Disney film Peter Pan.
- Jungle Cruise was parodied as Timon and Pumbaa's Virtual Safari on The Lion King Special Edition DVD (as their Nighttime Safari Boat Tour). A similar bonus feature called Baloo's Virtual Swingin’ Jungle Cruise is featured on the 40th anniversary special edition DVD of the 1967 animated Disney film, The Jungle Book.
- The Maverick Theater in Fullerton, California, once hosted a reoccurring stand-up comedy show called the "Skipper Stand Up Show" featuring Jungle Cruise skippers.
- "Weird Al" Yankovic wrote and recorded a song titled "Skipper Dan" about a failed actor who ended up as a tour guide on the Jungle Cruise ride. The song is included on his 2009 digital Internet Leaks EP and his 2011 album, Alpocalypse.
- The cruise boat and the "River Expedition Company" boathouse were incorporated into an original painting and limited edition print offering by artist Randy Souders titled "Jungle Cruise", created for the 1999 Official Disneyana Convention at Disneyland.
- Tales from Adventureland, a 2017–2018 book series by Jason Lethcoe, would prominently incorporate elements from the Jungle Cruise within its narrative, with the Jungle Navigation Company being the primary means of transportation for the Jungle Exploration Society and Albert Awol being a crucial supporting character alongside his daughter Abigail Awol.
- In 2022, Disney Television Animation's short series Chibi Tiny Tales featured a short with the DuckTales 2017 characters visiting the ride.
- In the StrongBad email "theme park" on the Homestar Runner web series, StrongBad operates "Strong Badian Riverquest Safariventure", a lampoon of Jungle Cruise where he reacts in deadpan style to fake dangers and chats with another tour guide.
- In the Chowder cartoon episode "The Poultry Geist", the characters sail down the River PretzelStyx in a boat with a guide who makes pun-filled remarks regarding the sights along their journey in a deadpan style (punctuated by a "Hey-yo!").
- The 2025 film Dora and the Search for Sol Dorado has the elements inspired by 2021 film Jungle Cruise, including the Hacienda Nápoles which is depicted as the Jungle World, a theme park inspired by the Jungle Cruise.

=== Soundtrack ===
A studio recorded soundtrack of the Jungle Cruise was released in 1968 by Disneyland Records included as the B side of the album Walt Disney Presents The Enchanted Tiki Room and the Adventurous Jungle Cruise (ST-3966). The Jungle Cruise attraction has always featured narration by a live Disney Cast Member; for the release the narration was provided by Thurl Ravenscroft. This soundtrack was also used in Disneyland television features as early as 1964.

=== Film adaptation ===
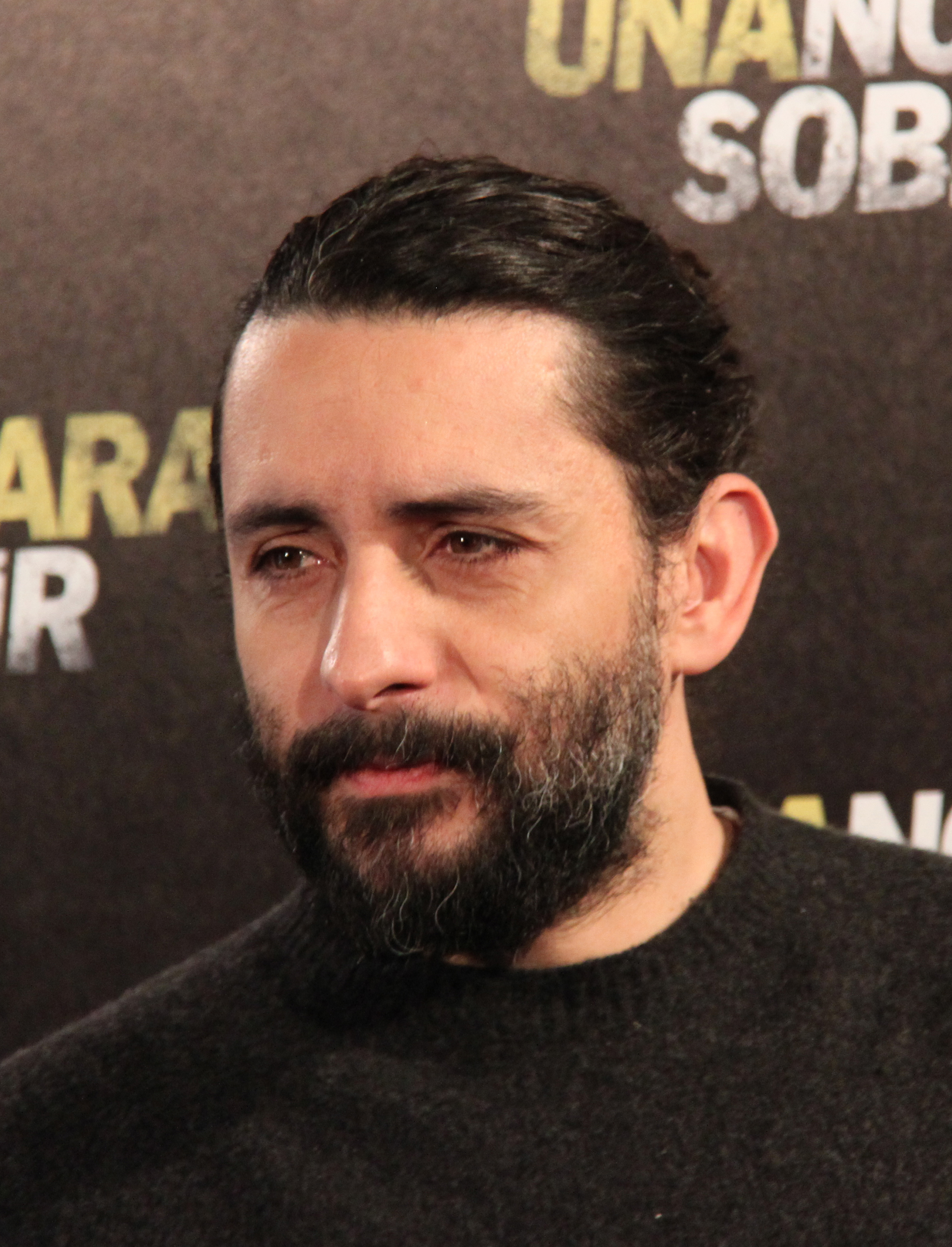
Jaume Collet-Serra, director of the 2021 film adaptation of the attraction

For years, Walt Disney Pictures contemplated the idea of making a full-length, action adventure film loosely inspired by the theme park attraction. Early planning set a production starting date in 2006 with a planned theatrical release in 2007, but multiple changes to the script and other issues delayed film production. The original screenplay by Josh Goldstein and John Norville was reportedly rewritten by Al Gough and Miles Millar.

Initially announced to star Toy Story duo Tom Hanks and Tim Allen, a later iteration of the project selected Dwayne Johnson for the starring role. The film was described by The Hollywood Reporter as a "period piece in the vein of Humphrey Bogart's The African Queen". Johnson also signed on as a producer, and production began in 2018. The film's release was delayed from 2019 to 2020 originally, and it was postponed again to 2021 during the COVID-19 pandemic. The world premiere for Jungle Cruise was held at Disneyland on July 24, 2021, followed by a theatrical release in the United States on July 30, 2021. The film's plot focuses on a group's riverboat journey through a jungle in search of a cure for many diseases.

== See also ==
- List of Disneyland attractions
- List of Magic Kingdom attractions
- Trader Sam's Enchanted Tiki Bar
