= Le Passage Enchanté d'Aladdin =

Attraction at Disneyland Paris

Coordinates: 48°52′21″N 2°46′32″E

Disneyland Park (Paris)
- Area: Adventureland
- Status: Operating
- Opening date: 1993

Ride statistics
- Attraction type: Walkthrough attraction
- Designer: Walt Disney Imagineering
- Theme: Aladdin
- Wheelchair accessible

Le Passage Enchanté d'Aladdin (French for Aladdin's Enchanted Passage) is a walkthrough attraction that opened in 1993 inside the Adventureland Bazaar building in Disneyland Paris' Adventureland area. The attraction features a series of showcase windows which recreate scenes from the Disney movie Aladdin.

== Summary ==
- One Jump Ahead: Aladdin, who stole food, is being pursued by the Sultan's guards throughout the City of Agrabah. This window recreates the One Jump Ahead scene from the movie.
- The Magic Lamp: This scene shows the Lamp sitting on top of a rock inside the Cave.
- Aladdin's Home: Aladdin, after escaping the guards, is back home, where he can gaze at the Sultan's Palace and dream of having one of his own.
- Cave of Wonders: Aladdin is reaching for the Tiger-shaped entrance to the Cave. One may notice the Lamp deep inside the Tiger's throat.
- Friend Like Me: Inside the Cave, Aladdin summons the Genie, who appears and delivers his Friend Like Me show from the movie.
- Prince Ali: Aladdin returns to Agrabah, disguised as mighty Prince Ali Ababwa, in order to marry Jasmine. In this scene, everyone in the streets hails to him, except for a raging Jafar who sees him as his rival.
- Snake-like Jafar: In the Palace, Jafar has turned into a gigantic snake, and attacks Aladdin. Jasmine can be seen trapped in the background.
- Jafar Defeated: Jafar, now a Genie, is swallowed inside his Lamp, taking Iago with him. Jasmine is now free from the sand. The faint-hearted Genie is hiding from the chaos behind a column.
- Farewell: Aladdin and Jasmine soar above Agrabah on the Magic Carpet, under a smiling Moon-shaped Genie, waving guests goodbye. The scene features the song "A Whole New World".
