= Adventureland Bazaar =

Shop in Disneyland Paris

Coordinates: 48°52′24″N 2°46′25″E

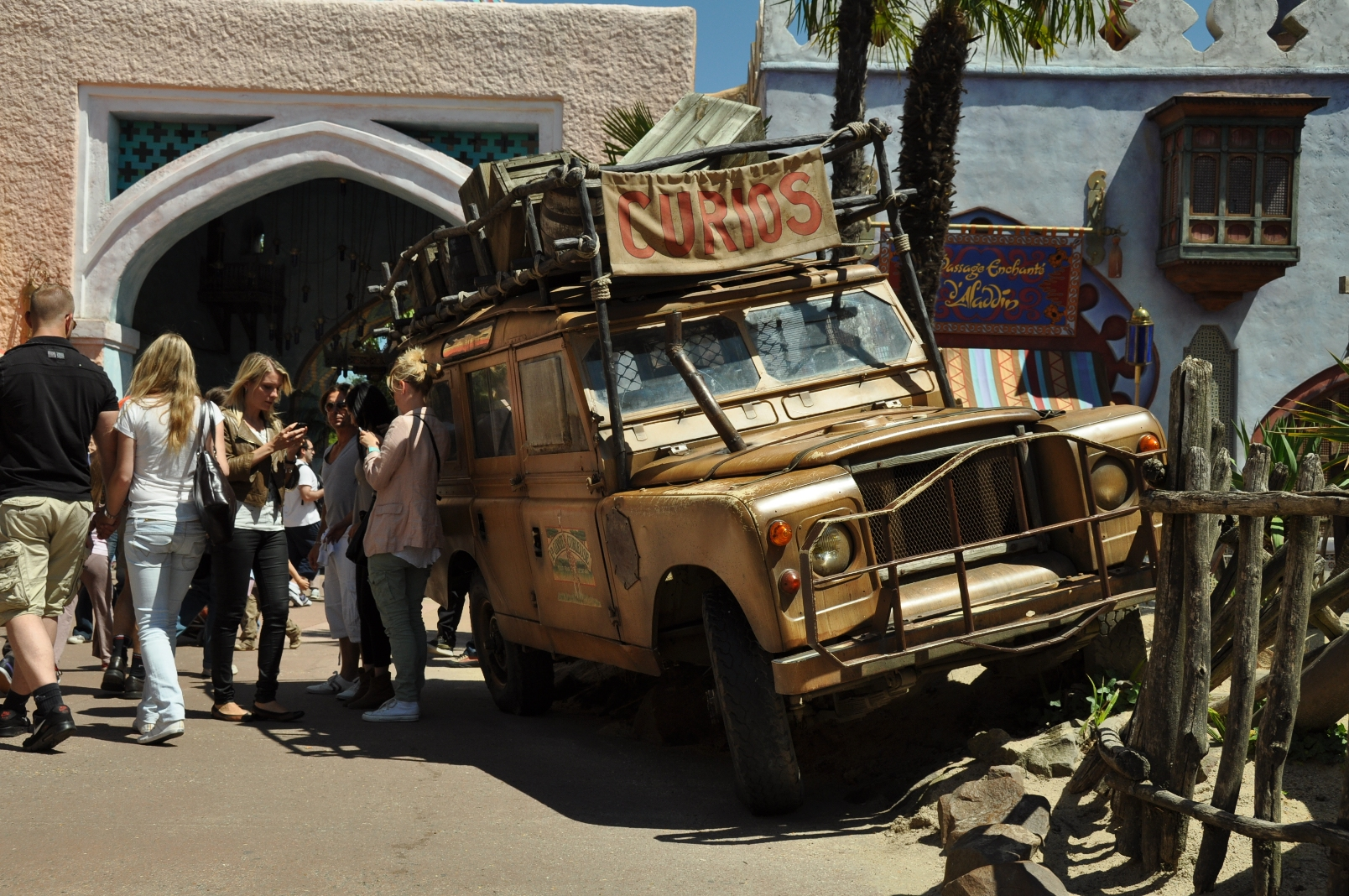
- Adventureland Bazaar Entrance

Disneyland Park (Paris)
- Area: Adventureland
- Status: Operating
- Opening date: April 12, 1992

Ride statistics
- Designer: Walt Disney Imagineering
- Theme: One Thousand and One Arabian Nights / Aladdin
- Wheelchair accessible

Adventureland Bazaar is the main entrance to Adventureland in Disneyland Paris, themed to the One Thousand and One Arabian Nights and Disney's Aladdin franchise.

== History ==
When designing Adventureland for Disneyland Paris, Imagineers intended to keep the original idea of blending exotic environments from Africa, Asia and the Caribbean. Yet, since the One Thousand and One Arabian Nights are part of the European vision of exotism, they decided to add a middle-eastern pavilion at the entrance of the land.

In 1992, at the opening of the land, the building originally featured a covered maze-like street network and many shops, including: Les Trésors de Schéhérazade (Schaharazade's Treasures), L'Echoppe d'Aladin (Aladin's Shop), La Reine des Serpents (The Snake Queen), Le Chant des Tam-Tams (The Tam-Tams' Song), and La Girafe Curieuse (The Curious Giraffe).

In 1993, one year after the release of the Disney film Aladdin, a walkthrough attraction opened in the Bazaar, named Le Passage Enchanté d'Aladdin (Aladdin's Enchanted Passage).

In 1999, most of the building was turned into the mediterranean table service restaurant Agrabah Café, with the exception of Le Passage Enchanté d'Aladdin, Les Trésors de Schéhérazade, and La Girafe Curieuse. All of the shops and streets were merged to make this restaurant, with their detailing unchanged (except for the shop Le Chant des Tam-Tams which was fully modified).

Originally, the building featured a proper oriental soundtrack. Since the Disney film Aladdin was released in 1992, this soundtrack was soon replaced with the movie's one. However, the original soundtrack was brought back shortly after the park's 15th anniversary.

== Related areas ==
At Disneyland in Anaheim, California, Adventureland Bazzar is a shop within the park's Adventureland area.

At Tokyo Disneyland, the Adventureland Bazzar shop in its Adventureland area is themed to the 1967 Disney film The Jungle Book.
