= Adventureland (Disney) =

Themed area in Disney theme parks

- Adventureland at Disneyland
- Theme: Remote jungles of Asia, Africa, South America, Oceania, the Caribbean Islands and the Middle East. Pirates

Disneyland
- Status: Operating
- Opened: July 17, 1955 (Sunday)

Magic Kingdom
- Status: Operating
- Opened: October 1, 1971 (Friday)

Tokyo Disneyland
- Status: Operating
- Opened: April 15, 1983 (Friday)

Disneyland Paris
- Status: Operating
- Opened: April 12, 1992 (Sunday)

Hong Kong Disneyland
- Status: Operating
- Opened: September 12, 2005 (Monday)

Shanghai Disneyland (As Adventure Isle)
- Status: Operating
- Opened: June 16, 2016 (Thursday)

Adventureland is one of the "themed lands" at the many Disneyland-style theme parks run by the Walt Disney Company around the world. It is themed to resemble the remote jungles in Africa, Asia, South America, Oceania and the Caribbean.

Adventureland provides a 1950s view of exotic adventure, capitalizing on the post-war Tiki craze. Lush vegetation resembles jungles while elements of the "other" surround the visitor. Tribal performance masks, conga drums, non-American totem poles, exotic animal statues, and architecture of Pacific influence make for a confined area wherein industry and technology take a back seat to uncharted nature. Noted art historian David T. Doris explains Adventureland as, "a pastiche of imaginary colonial spaces, conflated within the green and foliate milieu of "the Jungle."

== Disneyland ==
Original dedication

Here is adventure. Here is romance. Here is mystery. Tropical rivers - silently flowing into the unknown. The unbelievable splendor of exotic flowers...the eerie sound of the jungle...with eyes that are always watching.

Walt Disney had no time in making this dedication speech as the live broadcast of the opening day was about to conclude.

Disneyland's Adventureland was originally envisioned as True-Life Adventureland, and was to be based on Walt Disney's award-winning nature documentaries on Africa and Asia. The land was originally supposed to have real animals from Africa to inhabit a jungle river, but after zoologists told Walt Disney the real animals would lie around or hide, the Imagineers built mechanical animals instead. Adventureland opened with the Jungle Cruise as its sole attraction, until the Swiss Family Treehouse was added in 1962. With the technology of Audio-Animatronics Walt Disney's Enchanted Tiki Room was added in 1963 nearby the land's entry bridge. Oceanic Arts also created the series of tribal masks that now line the entry bridge.

Indiana Jones Adventure opened in 1995 and gave the entire land a 1930s theme, which concurs with the setting created by the rustic boats of the Jungle Cruise and the voice character Albert Awol who plays big band music from the 1930s. In 1999, the Swiss Family Treehouse was transformed into Tarzan's Treehouse, when then became Adventureland Treehouse in 2023. In 2008, Adventureland presented the Indiana Jones Summer of Hidden Mysteries event.

=== Attractions and entertainment ===
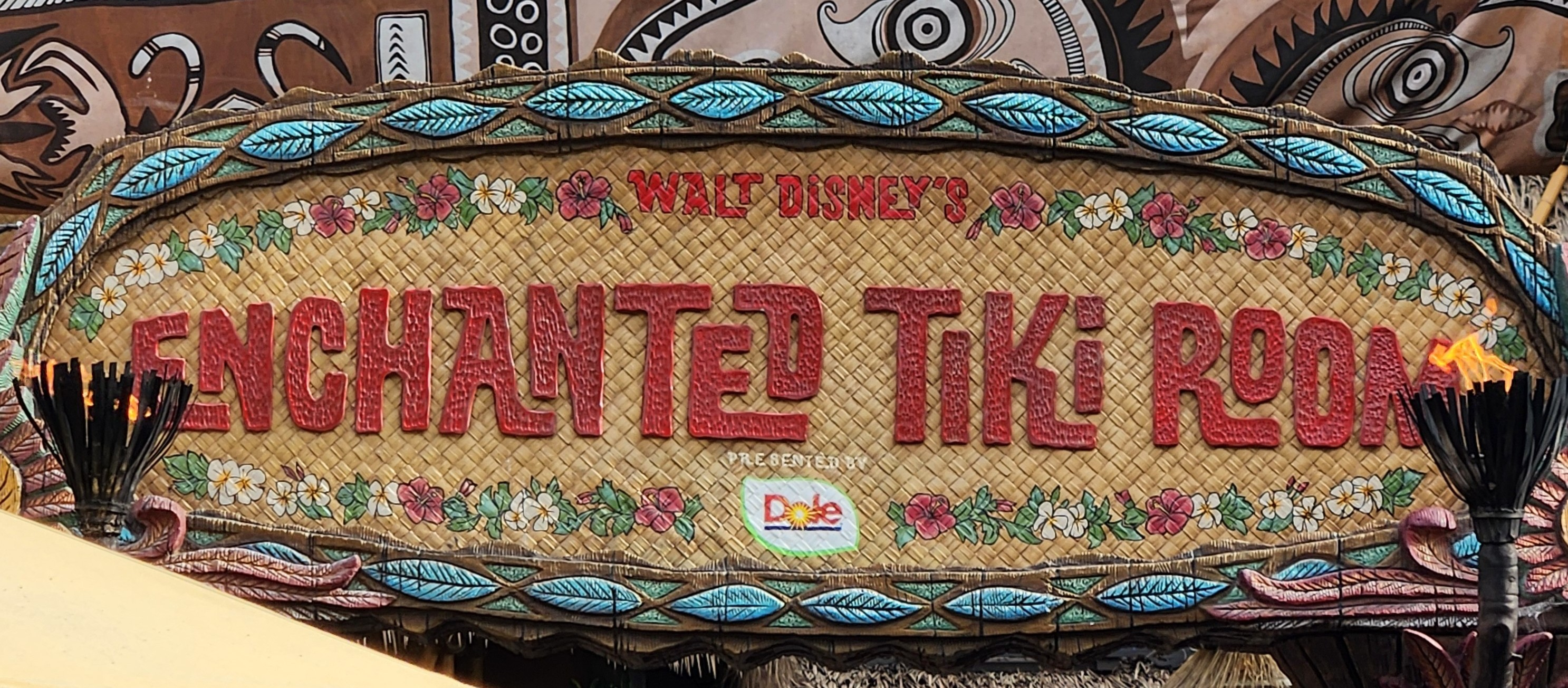
Walt Disney's Enchanted Tiki Room opened in 1963 and was the first attraction to use Audio-Animatronics

- Indiana Jones Adventure: Temple of the Forbidden Eye (1995–present)
- Jungle Cruise (1955–present)
- Walt Disney's Enchanted Tiki Room (1963–present)
- Adventureland Treehouse (2023-present)

=== Former attractions and entertainment ===
- Magnolia Park (1955–1962)
- Swiss Family Treehouse (1962–1999)
- Big Game Safari Shooting Gallery (1962–1982)
- Aladdin's Oasis Dinner Show (1993–1997)
- Aladdin's Oasis (1993–2008)
- Tarzan's Treehouse (1999–2021)

=== Restaurants and refreshments ===
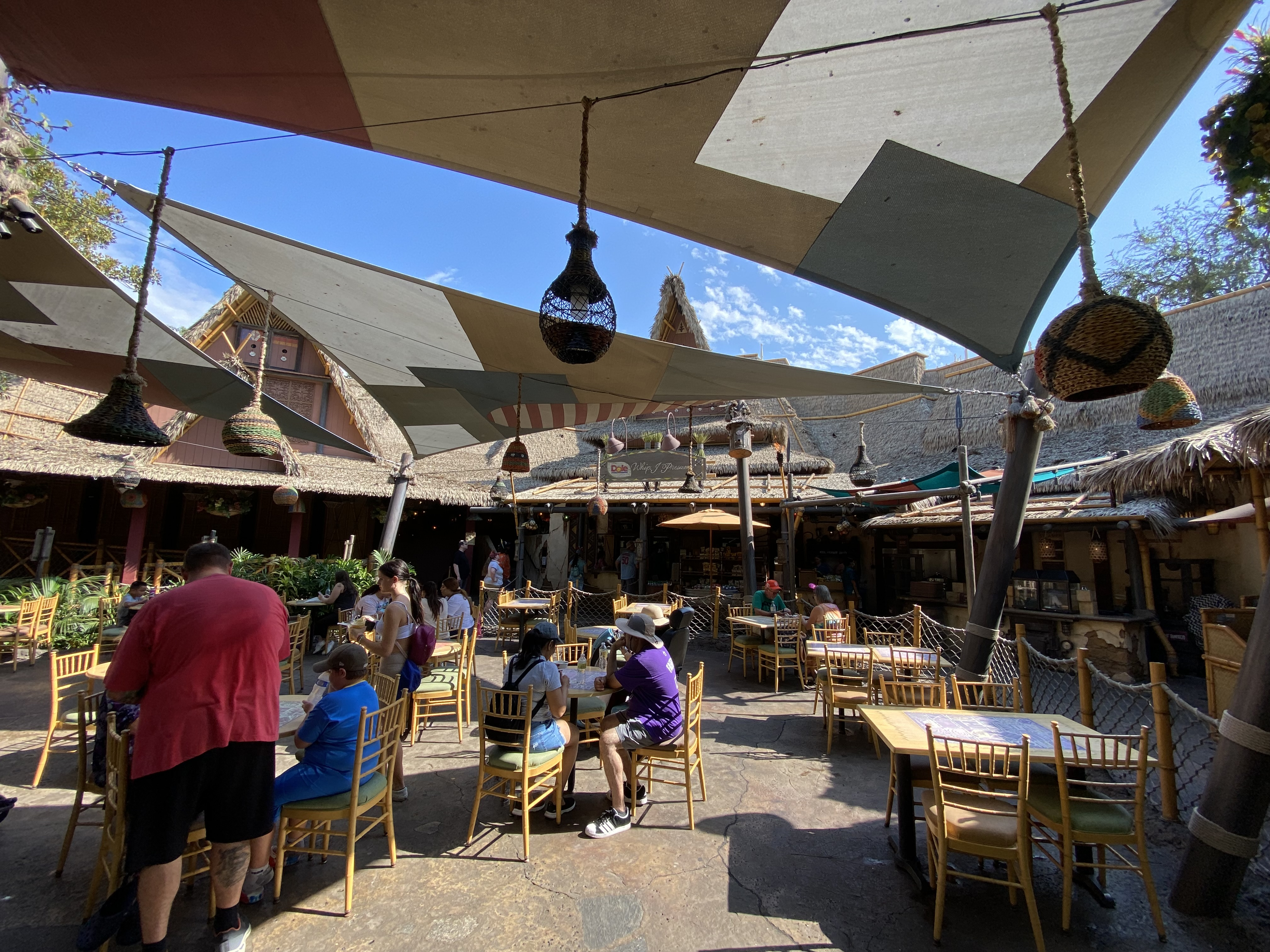
Tropical Hideaway in Disneyland

- Bengal Barbecue (1990-present)
- Tiki Juice Bar (1968-present)
- Tropical Imports
- The Tropical Hideaway (2018-present)

=== Former restaurants and refreshments ===
- Tropical Cantina (1955–1962)
- Sunkist I Presume (1962–1992)
- Tahitian Terrace (1962–1993)
- Indy Fruit Cart (1995–2006)

=== Shops ===
- Adventureland Bazaar

=== Former shops ===
- Tiki's Tropical Traders (1955–1966+)
- Safari Outpost (1986–1995)
- Indiana Jones Adventure Outpost (1995-2017)
- South Seas Traders (1984-2017)

== Magic Kingdom ==
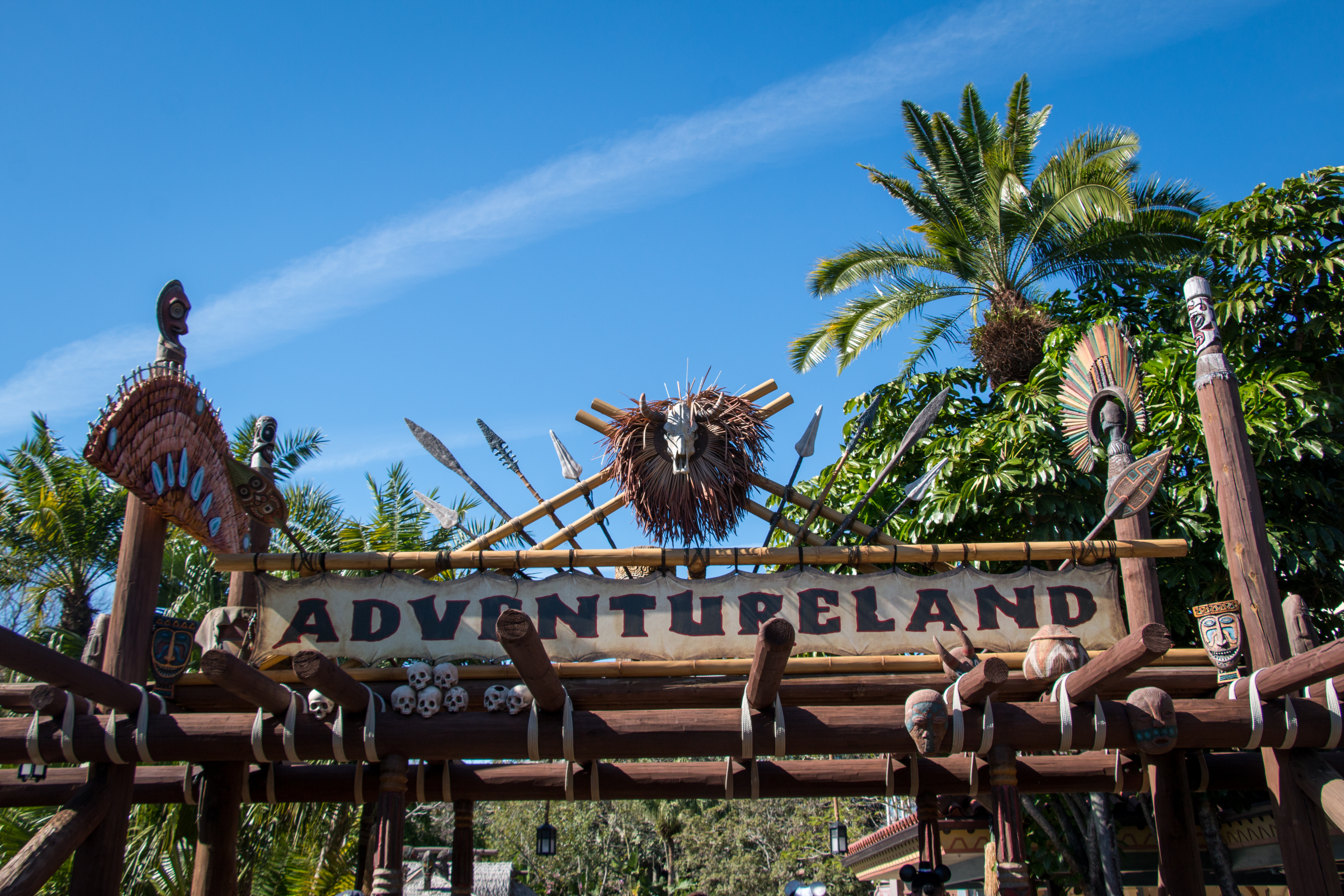
Adventureland at Magic Kingdom

The Adventureland at Walt Disney World is divided into two main sub-areas, one being the Arabian Village and the other one being Caribbean Plaza, which is home to Pirates of the Caribbean. The original Polynesian motif is still visible with the prominence of jungle surrounding the Swiss Family Treehouse and Walt Disney's Enchanted Tiki Room. The 1930s adventurer/explorer ambiance is noted with the background music heard over loud projecting speakers recently installed throughout Adventureland with a different vibe than that of Disneyland's, but with similar Big Band music and witty announcements. The Magic Carpets of Aladdin attraction was unique to this version of Adventureland before the opening of Tokyo DisneySea and Walt Disney Studios Park in Paris.

=== Attractions and entertainment ===
Note: ▲ = Genie Plus / Lightning Lane available

Table-Service Restaurants

- Jungle Skipper Canteen - themed after the Jungle Cruise.
- The Beak and Barrel

Quick-Service Food

- Sunshine Tree Terrace
- Aloha Isle - serves various flavors of Dole Whip, sponsored by Dole Foods.
- Adventureland Springroll Cart

Rides

- Jungle Cruise ▲
- Pirates of the Caribbean ▲
- The Magic Carpets of Aladdin ▲

Attractions

- Walt Disney's Enchanted Tiki Room - located inside the Sunshine pavilion.
- Swiss Family Treehouse - themed after the 1960 Disney film Swiss Family Robinson.
- A Pirates Adventure -Treasures of the Seven Seas - an interactive scavenger hunt where you can join Captain Jack on a series of missions throughout Adventureland.

Merchandise

- Plaza del Sol Caribe Bazaar - the Pirates of the Caribbean exit gift shop, specializing in Pirate-themed merchandise. The shop also includes a leather engraving station.
- Bwana Bobs - named after Bob Hope, an outdoor merchandise location.
- Sunglass Hut - a third-party vendor that sells sunglasses and accessories.
- Crystal Arts - a second smaller location of Crystal Arts, the main location being on Main Street.

Points Of Interest

- Club 33 - an exclusive members-only club located in the Adventureland Veranda.

=== Former attractions and entertainment ===
- Sunshine pavilion
  - Tropical Serenade (1971–1998)
  - The Enchanted Tiki Room (Under New Management) (1998–2011)
- Tinker Bell's Magical Nook (2011–2014)
- The Pirates League, a pirate-themed version of Bibbidi Bobbidi Boutique.

=== Former restaurants and refreshments ===
- Adventureland Veranda (1971–1994)
- Tortuga Tavern - after Pirates of the Caribbean themed (2011–2024)

=== Former shops ===
- Tiki Tropic Shop (1971–2000)
- The Magic Carpet (1971–1987)
- Traders of Timbuktu (1971–2000)
- Oriental Imports (1971–1987)
- Tropic Toppers (1971–1988)
- The House of Treasure (located in Caribbean Plaza, 1973–2001)
- The Golden Galleon and La Princesa de Cristal (also located in Caribbean Plaza, 1974–1992)
- The Pirate's Arcade (Caribbean Plaza, 1974–1980)
- Tortuga Treasures (Caribbean Plaza, 2024) - a new temporary gift shop was taking place on the main Pirates of the Caribbean Gift shop in the Plaza del Sol Caribe Bazaar, some of the merchandise has now been relocated.
- Elephant Tales
- Zanzibar Trading Co.
- Agrabah Bazaar

While the House of Treasure opened originally when the Pirates premiered in December 1973, it started fully operating in February 1974 according to a March 1974 issue of "Eyes and Ears", a cast member newsletter for Walt Disney World.

== Tokyo Disneyland ==
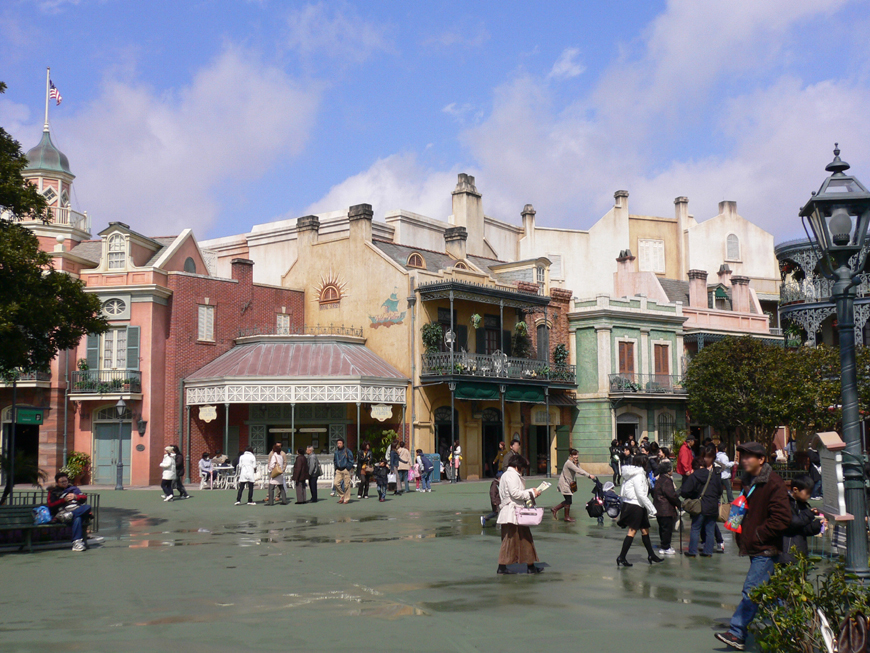
Adventureland at Tokyo Disneyland

Tokyo Disneyland's Adventureland is a mish-mash of the various Adventureland interpretations. It features a unique ride - the Western River Railroad - and a Lilo & Stitch-themed version of Walt Disney's Enchanted Tiki Room. It features a pair of sub-lands: The Typhoon Lagoon inspired Coral Landing near the Swiss Family Treehouse and another one based on New Orleans Square at Disneyland, which features Pirates of the Caribbean. World Bazaar's buildings fade into New Orleans.

On April 28, 2025, the Oriental Land Company announced that Western River Railroad, Jungle Cruise: Wildlife Expeditions and The Enchanted Tiki Room: Stitch Presents Aloha e Komo Mai will be closing and replaced with a new The Incredibles, Up and Moana attraction in the section of Adventureland at Tokyo Disneyland.

=== Attractions and entertainment ===
- Sunshine Pavilion
  - The Enchanted Tiki Room: Stitch Presents Aloha e Komo Mai! (2008–present)
- Jungle Cruise: Wildlife Expeditions (2014–present)
- Theatre Orleans
  - Jamboree Mickey! Let's Dance!
- Polynesian Terrace Show
  - Mickey's Rainbow Luau! (2016-2020, 2023–present)
- Pirates Brass
- Pirates of the Caribbean (1983–present)
- Western River Railroad (1983–present)

=== Former attractions and entertainment ===
- Sunshine Pavilion
  - The Enchanted Tiki Room (1983–1999)
  - The Enchanted Tiki Room: Now Playing "Get the Fever!" (1999–2008)
- Jungle Cruise (1983–2014)
- Swiss Family Treehouse (1993-2022)
- Adventureland Stage (1983–2000)
  - Road to Adventure (1983–1984)
  - Adventureland Revue (1984–1993)
  - Sebastian's Caribbean Carnival (1993–1996)
  - Fiesta Tropical (1996–2000)
- Polynesian Terrace Show
  - Mickey & Minnie's Polynesian Paradise (2009–2015)
  - Lilo's Luau & Fun (2005–2020)
- Theatre Orleans
  - Mickey's Adventureland Mardi Gras (2001–2004)
  - Minnie Oh! Minnie (2004–2018)
  - Let's Party Gras! (2018-2020)
- Jungle Rhythms (2016–2020)
- Jungle SounDuo

=== Restaurants and refreshments ===
- Royal Street Veranda
- Blue Bayou Restaurant
- Café Orleans
- The Gazebo
- Crystal Palace Restaurant
- Moana's Polynesian Terrace Restaurant
- Parkside Wagon
- Boiler Room Bites
- China Voyager
- Squeezer's Tropical Juice Bar
- Fresh Fruit Oasis
- The Skipper's Galley

=== Shops ===
- The Golden Galleon
- Pirate Treasure
- Cristal Arts
- La Petite Parfumerie
- Party Gras Gifts
- Adventureland Bazaar
- Le Marché Bleu

== Disneyland Park Paris ==
Adventureland at Disneyland Park Paris is geographically switched with Frontierland, compared to the American parks. It contains more heavy Indian and Moroccan influences. It features four themed areas:

- The first, known as Adventureland Bazar, is a recreation of an oriental city from the 1001 Arabian Nights. While most people believe this reflects Agrabah from the movie Aladdin, this is a common mistake. The movie Aladdin was still in production when Euro Disney was designed. And the Imagineers working on Adventureland, did not work together with the people creating the movie. In 1993, the attraction Le Passage Enchanté d'Aladdin opened in this area and is the only feature of the land actually based on the movie. The concept of this city eventually reached overseas resorts.
- The second part of Adventureland has a more African appearance, and is mainly composed of shops and restaurants (like the Hakuna Matata Restaurant).
- A third themed area represents Asian mysterious jungles, themed to explorers and featuring the Indiana Jones et le Temple du Péril roller coaster.
- The last part, and the biggest, is a Caribbean area, covering most of the surface of Adventureland. It features the ride Pirates of the Caribbean and Adventure Isle, a Tom Sawyer Island-like walkthrough spot, with some attractions like Swiss Family Treehouse or Captain Hook's Pirate Ship.

This Adventureland presented some construction problems, mainly due to the unsuitable local climate. Growing exotic jungles in a place where winters could be harsh was a tough task. This is also the reason why there is no Jungle Cruise ride, since most animatronics animals would have been exposed to this weather. However, abandoned ideas intended to build an adequate ride under a glass roof, but that never came true.

There is no Tiki Room attraction either, although the Explorers Club Restaurant (now Colonel Hathi's Outpost) features animatronics birds that used to sing.

=== Attractions and entertainment ===
- Adventure Isle (1992–present)
- La Plage des Pirates
- La Cabane des Robinson - (Swiss Family Treehouse) (1992–present)
- Le Passage Enchanté d'Aladdin - (Aladdin's Enchanted Passage) (1993–present)
- Pirates of the Caribbean (1992–present)
- Rhythm of the Jungle
- Indiana Jones et le Temple du Péril - (Indiana Jones and the Temple of Peril) (1993–present)

=== Former attractions and entertainment ===
- Following the Leader with Peter Pan

=== Restaurants and refreshments ===
- Colonel Hathi's Pizza Outpost
- Adventureland Bazaar
- Hakuna Matata Restaurant
- Le Café de la Brousse
- Restaurant Agrabah Café
- Coolpost
- Captain Hook's Galley
- Le Comptoir du Capitaine
- Captain Jack Restaurant (formerly Blue Lagoon Restaurant)

=== Former restaurants and refreshments ===
- Les Epices Enchantées (1992–1995)
- Explorers Club (1992–1995)
- The Bazar (1992–1999)

=== Shops ===
- Les Trésors de Shéhérazade (Shahrazade's Treasures)
- La Girafe Curieuse (The Curious Giraffe)
- Indiana Jones Adventure Outpost
- Mushu's Boutique
- Le Coffre du Capitaine (The Captain's Chest)

== Hong Kong Disneyland ==
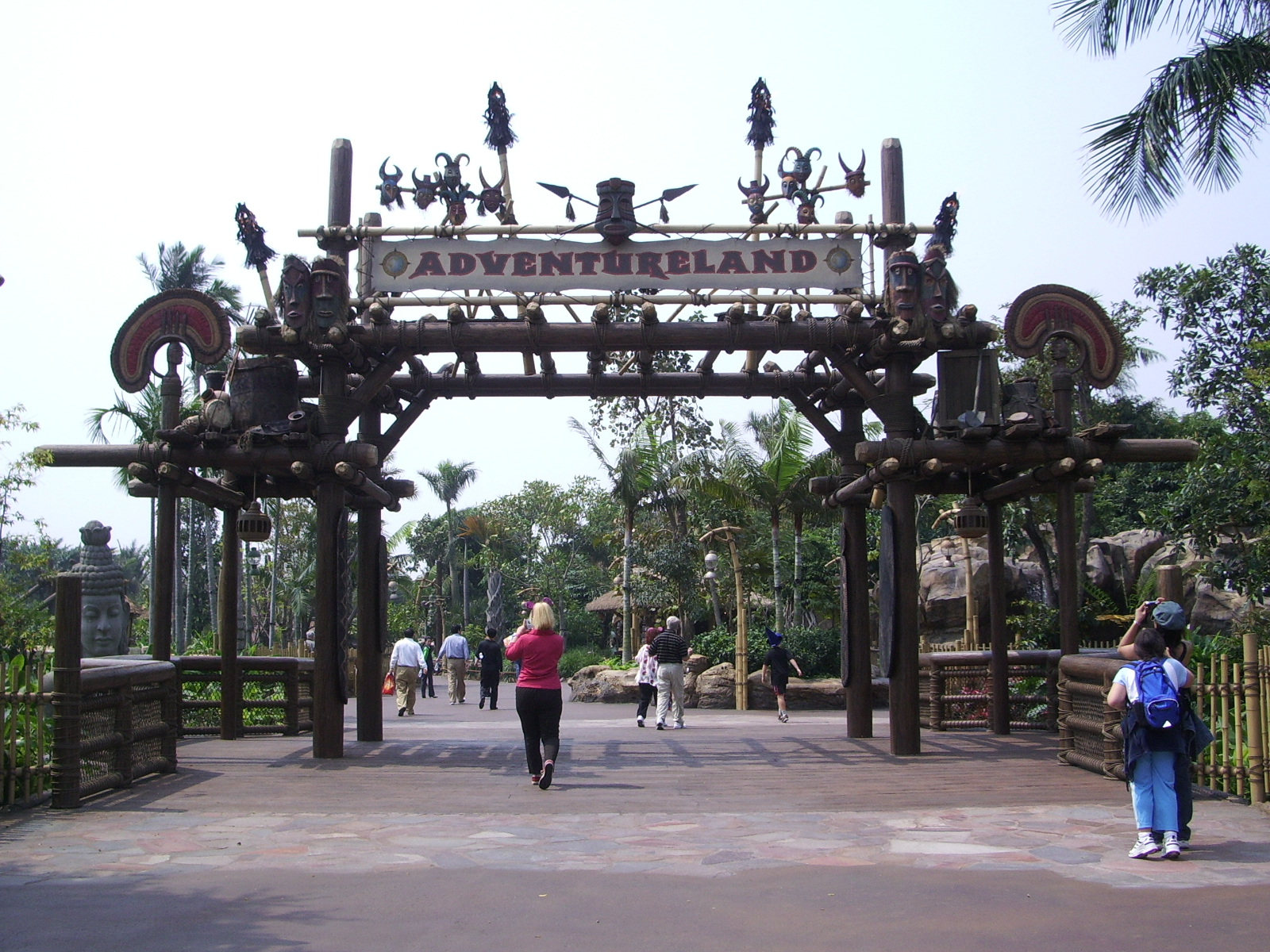
Adventureland at Hong Kong Disneyland

Hong Kong Disneyland's Adventureland is the biggest among all Disney parks and features a large island area home to Tarzan's Treehouse, which is circled by the Jungle River Cruise, not much like the Rivers of America in most Magic Kingdom–style parks' Adventureland area, but it was under the name of Rivers of Adventure. It is also home to the "Festival of the Lion King" show.

In early May to August 2007, the land was converted into Pirateland, in conjunction with the release of the film Pirates of the Caribbean: At World's End.

The outer edge of the land was under construction from early May to September 2008, adjacent to Festival of The Lion King. A temporary structure was built for Demon Jungle, an exclusive attraction for the 2008–2010 Halloween seasons, and transformed to The Revenge of the Headless Horseman for the 2011–2014 Halloween seasons; it is now home to introduced its all-new "Black Box" space" known as "The Pavilion", a flexible event venue. Unlike the other parks, there is still no Pirates of the Caribbean at this location yet.

On September 1, 2017, the area around the bridge that near the entrance of the theme land and in front of Tahitian Terence has surround by fences hiding the works starting recently for "Moana: A Homecoming Celebration" opening on 2018, as part of its multiyear expansion plan for the Park since November 22, 2016.

=== Attractions and entertainment ===
- Theater in the Wild:
  - Festival of the Lion King (2005–present)
- Rivers of Adventure:
  - Jungle River Cruise (2005–present)
  - Tarzan's Treehouse (2005–present)
    - Rafts to Tarzan's Treehouse
- Karibuni Marketplace
- Liki Tikis
- Jungle Junction
  - Adventure is Out There! (2023–present)
- Street Entertainment at Adventureland

=== Former attractions and entertainment ===
- Lucky the Dinosaur (2005–2006)
- Jungle Puppet Carnival (2005–2009)
- Jungle Junction
  - Moana: A Homecoming Celebration (2018–2020)

=== Restaurants and refreshments ===
- Wayfinders' Table
- River View Cafe
- Korean Squid, Turkey Leg, Refreshing Drinks, & Frozen Lollipop Cart
- Korean Squid & Turkey Leg Cart

=== Shops ===
- Professor Porter's Trading Post

== Shanghai Disneyland Park ==
Shanghai Disneyland Park features an area named Adventure Isle. Just like "Adventureland" at Disneyland Park Paris, "Adventure Isle" does not include a Jungle Cruise attraction, and instead features a ropes course called "Camp Discovery", a dinosaur-themed rapids attraction named "Roaring Rapids and Soaring Over the Horizon. This version is also different in the fact that it is on the right side of the main hub instead of being on the left.

The land's story focuses around a group called the League of Adventurers, who came upon the island after their airship was driven off course in the 1930s. Befriending the native Arbori tribe, they have been engaged in studying their culture and the island ever since. Each attraction is tied to a Guardian Animal in the Arbori mythology: Roaring Rapids is the realm of Q'aráq; a giant crocodilian Guardian of Water, Soaring Over the Horizon is located in a celestial temple to Q'otar; a condor spirit of the air, and Camp Discovery lies in the realm of Q'ai; the fanged cat guardian of the earth.

=== Attractions and entertainment ===
- Camp Discovery
- Explorer Canoes
- Happy Circle
- Roaring Rapids (2016–present)
- Soaring Over the Horizon (2016–present)
- Storyhouse Stage
  - The Adventure of Rhythm

=== Former attractions and entertainment ===
- Storyhouse Stage
  - Tarzan: Call of the Jungle (2016–2019)

=== Restaurants and refreshments ===
- Tribal Table
- Piranha Bites

=== Shops ===
- Chip 'n Dale's Trading Post (formerly Laughing Monkey Traders)
- Rainbow Frog Trinkets

== In popular culture ==
In the Epic Mickey series, Wasteland's version of Adventureland is Ventureland. Its main elements is the movie Peter Pan and the Pirates of the Caribbean attraction.

In 2021, Disney released the feature film Jungle Cruise, based on the attraction of the same name. Not only are there many references to the attraction, but also other attractions within Adventureland and the land as a whole.
