= Matata (group) =

Norwegian Music Group

- Origin: Nairobi, Oslo
- Genres: Genge; Afrobeat
- Years active: 2019-present
- Members: Freddy Milanya, Richie Mathu, Marcus Ojiambo, Festus Mwenda
- Past members: Ken Kimathi

Matata are a Kenyan genge music group based in Oslo, Norway, originally composed of Freddy Milanya, Richie Mathu, Marcus Ojiambo, Festus Mwenda and Ken Kimathi. They were founded in 2016 and released their first single in 2019. The languages used in the songs include Sheng and Kikuyu.

Oslo-based video production company Vjus has made music videos for several of Matata's songs and documented the behind-the-scenes process on Youtube.

In January 2025, Ken Kimathi is presumed to have left the group.

In 2025, Matata went on tour with Kenyan singer, songwriter and guitarist Bien-Aimé Baraza.
