= Western River Railroad =

Railroad at Tokyo Disneyland

Coordinates: 35.633732°N 139.882427°E

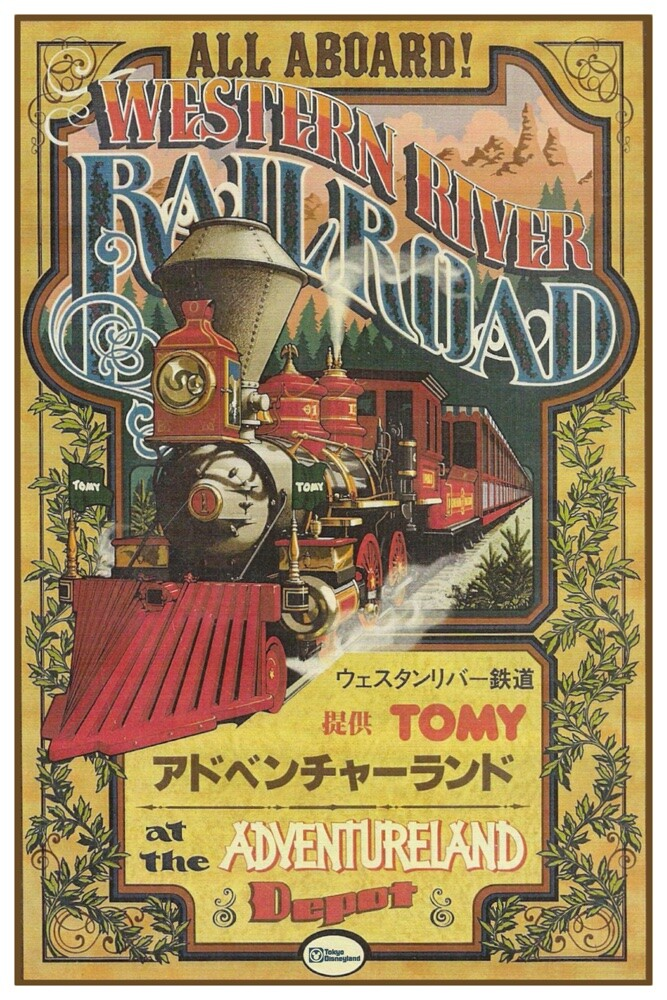
- Attraction poster

Tokyo Disneyland
- Area: Adventureland
- Status: Operating
- Opening date: April 15, 1983

Ride statistics
- Attraction type: Heritage railway
- Manufacturer: Kyosan Kogyo
- Designer: Walt Disney Imagineering
- Length: 5,283 ft (1,610 m)
- Vehicle type: Train
- Vehicles: 4 steam locomotives; 12 passenger cars
- Riders per vehicle: 140 per train
- No. of tracks: Single
- Track gauge: 2 ft 6 in (762 mm)
- Sponsor: Takara Tomy

The Western River Railroad (reporting mark WRR) is a 2 ft 6 in (762 mm) narrow gauge rail transport attraction in Tokyo Disneyland, which opened on April 15, 1983. Its route is 5,283 feet (1,610 m) long and takes guests through the Adventureland, Westernland, and Critter Country sections.

== Overview ==
Sponsored by Takara Tomy, the Western River Railroad is one of two rail attractions at Tokyo Disney Resort, the other being the DisneySea Electric Railway at Tokyo DisneySea. Unlike other Disney railroad attractions, it does not circle the whole park. Instead, the railroad only passes through Adventureland, Westernland, and Critter Country. Additionally, this railroad has a track gauge is 2 ft 6 in (762 mm) narrow gauge as compared with other Disney railroad track gauges of 3 ft (914 mm) narrow gauge.

At the time that the Western River Railroad was opened, Japanese rail regulations required that any railway line with more than one stop be subject to the same rules as any other conventional rail line, which included running on a timetable and collecting fares; this law was eventually abolished on April 1, 1987. As such, there is only one stop on the Western River Railroad in order to avoid having to charge fares and to allow the use of passenger cars that are not fully enclosed, which would not be allowed otherwise.

== Ride experience ==
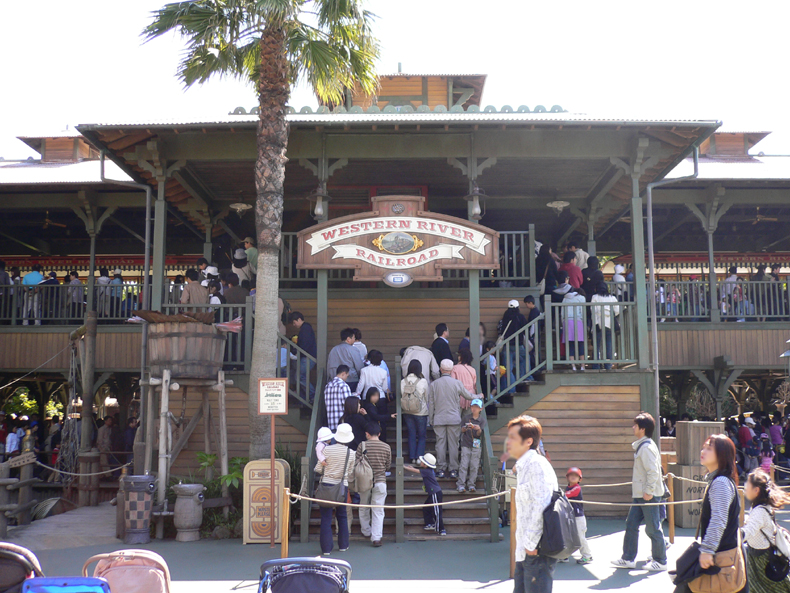
The Western River Railroad station entrance

Going clockwise around the loop, the train departs Adventureland Station, and passes through Stillwater Junction, a Western-themed train station (though the train does not stop here). Afterwards, the train goes through a forest where passengers are able to see animatronic displays of wild animals and Native Americans. Continuing down the line, the train crosses over a long trestle through the Critter Country section and the Big Thunder Mountain Railroad attraction in the Westernland section. Finally, it enters through a deep tunnel containing the Primeval World Diorama (featuring animatronic dinosaurs) and exits back to the Adventureland Station.

== Rolling stock ==
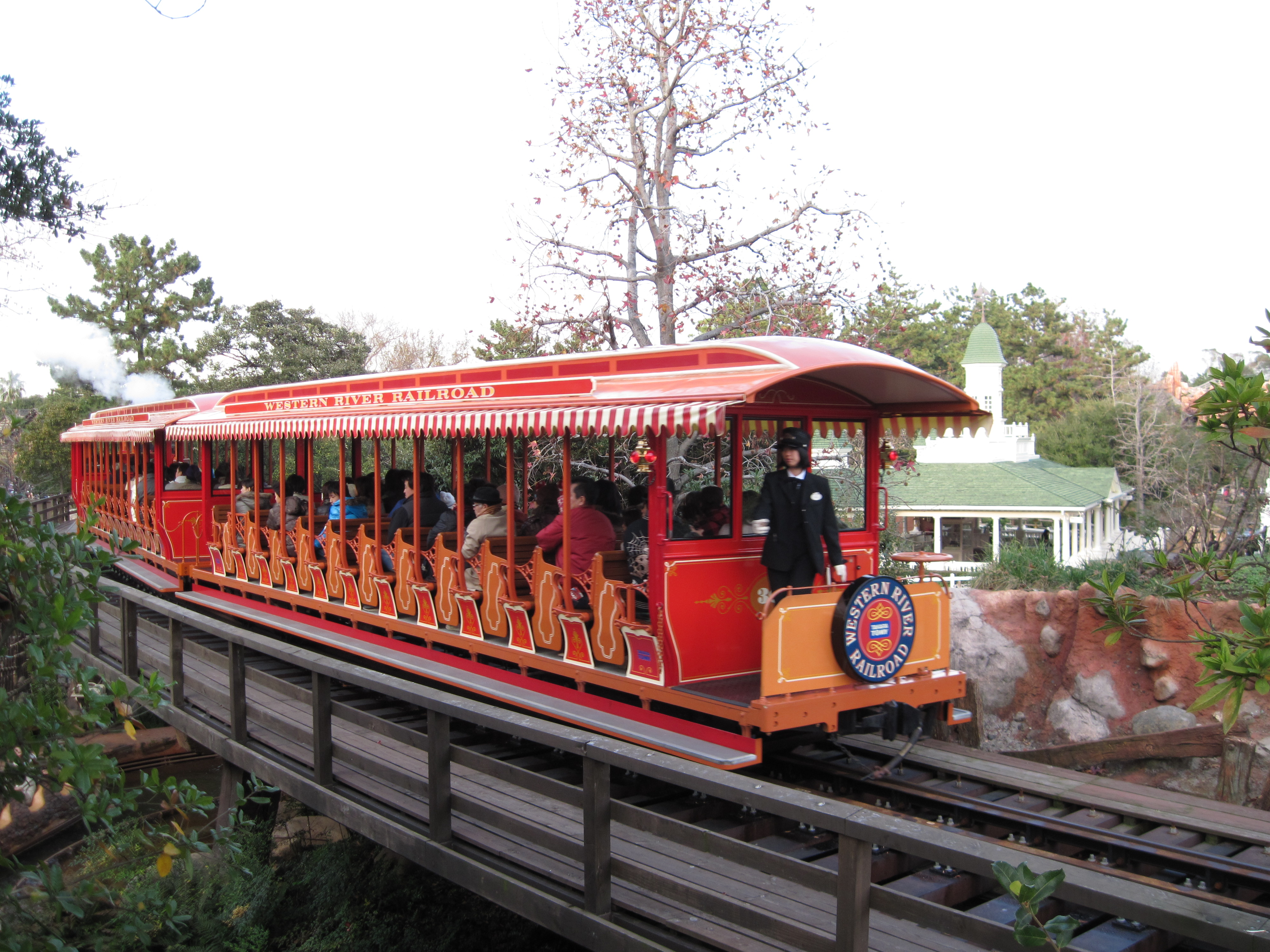
Western River Railroad passenger cars (300 series)

The Western River Railroad has four 2 ft 6 in (762 mm) narrow gauge 2-4-0 steam locomotives built by Kyosan Kogyo Co., which were named after famous rivers located primarily in the Western United States (hence the name of the railroad). All four locomotives were designed to resemble the Denver & Rio Grande Montezuma locomotive, originally built by the Baldwin Locomotive Works. Each WRR locomotive shares the same tender design, which holds 264 US gallons (1,000 L) of fuel and 475 US gallons (1,800 L) of water.

The railroad also has a fleet of twelve passenger cars, with three coaches assigned to each locomotive. The passenger cars are based on the excursion cars used on the Disneyland Railroad and Walt Disney World Railroad, with guests facing forward. Each coach has a small door in each row of seats that swings inward as a safety precaution.

Western River Railroad rolling stock details
Number and name	Namesake	Image	Wheel arrangement	Date built	Builder	Serial number	Passenger cars	Date entered service	Status	Notes
53 Colorado	Colorado River	The WRR's No. 58 locomotive.	2-4-0 (Porter)	1982	Kyosan Kogyo Co.	10096	Three reddish-brown passenger cars (100 series)	April 15, 1983	Operational	The locomotive's number refers to the year 1953 when Walt Disney presented the plans for the original Disneyland.
28 Missouri	Missouri River	The WRR's No. 28 locomotive.	2-4-0 (Porter)	1982	Kyosan Kogyo Co.	10095	Three green passenger cars (200 series)	April 15, 1983	Operational	The locomotive's number refers to the year 1928, when the Disney animated short Steamboat Willie was released, the first cartoon with synchronized sound.
25 Rio Grande	Rio Grande	The WRR's No. 25 locomotive.	2-4-0 (Porter)	1982	Kyosan Kogyo Co.	10094	Three red passenger cars (300 series)	April 15, 1983	Operational	The locomotive's number refers to the year 1925, when Walt Disney married his wife, Lillian Disney.
20 Mississippi	Mississippi River	The WRR's No. 20 locomotive.	2-4-0 (Porter)	1991	Kyosan Kogyo Co.	10100	Three red/blue passenger cars (400 series)	October 8, 1991	Operational	The locomotive's number refers to the year 1920 when Walt Disney, along with his friend Ub Iwerks, founded his first company, Iwerks-Disney Commercial Artists.

== See also ==
- Rail transport in Walt Disney Parks and Resorts

== Bibliography ==
- Amendola, Dana (2015), All Aboard: The Wonderful World of Disney Trains (1st ed.), Disney Editions, ISBN 978-1-4231-1714-8
- Broggie, Michael (2014), Walt Disney's Railroad Story: The Small-Scale Fascination That Led to a Full-Scale Kingdom (4th ed.), The Donning Company Publishers, ISBN 978-1-57864-914-3
