= Colonel Hathi's Pizza Outpost =

Restaurant in Disneyland Paris

Disneyland Park (Paris)
- Area: Adventureland
- Status: Operating
- Opening date: April 12, 1992

Ride statistics
- Designer: Walt Disney Imagineering
- Theme: Explorers, Jungle Book
- Previous name: Explorer's Club

Colonel Hathi's Pizza Outpost is a restaurant located in Adventureland, in Disneyland Paris. It opened in 1992 with the park under the name Explorer's Club. It specialises in a wide range of pizzas and pastas.

== History ==
The building originally housed the Explorer's Club, a table-service restaurant that opened with Euro Disneyland on April 12, 1992. Located in Adventureland, the restaurant was themed as a meeting place for explorers and adventurers.

The Explorer's Club closed in March 1994. The restaurant reopened in April 1994 as Colonel Hathi's Pizza Outpost, taking its new name and theme from Colonel Hathi, the elephant character from Disney's 1967 animated film The Jungle Book. Much of the building's original Explorer's Club theming was retained after the conversion, including its collection of travel and exploration-themed artifacts and architectural details.

== Explorer's Club ==
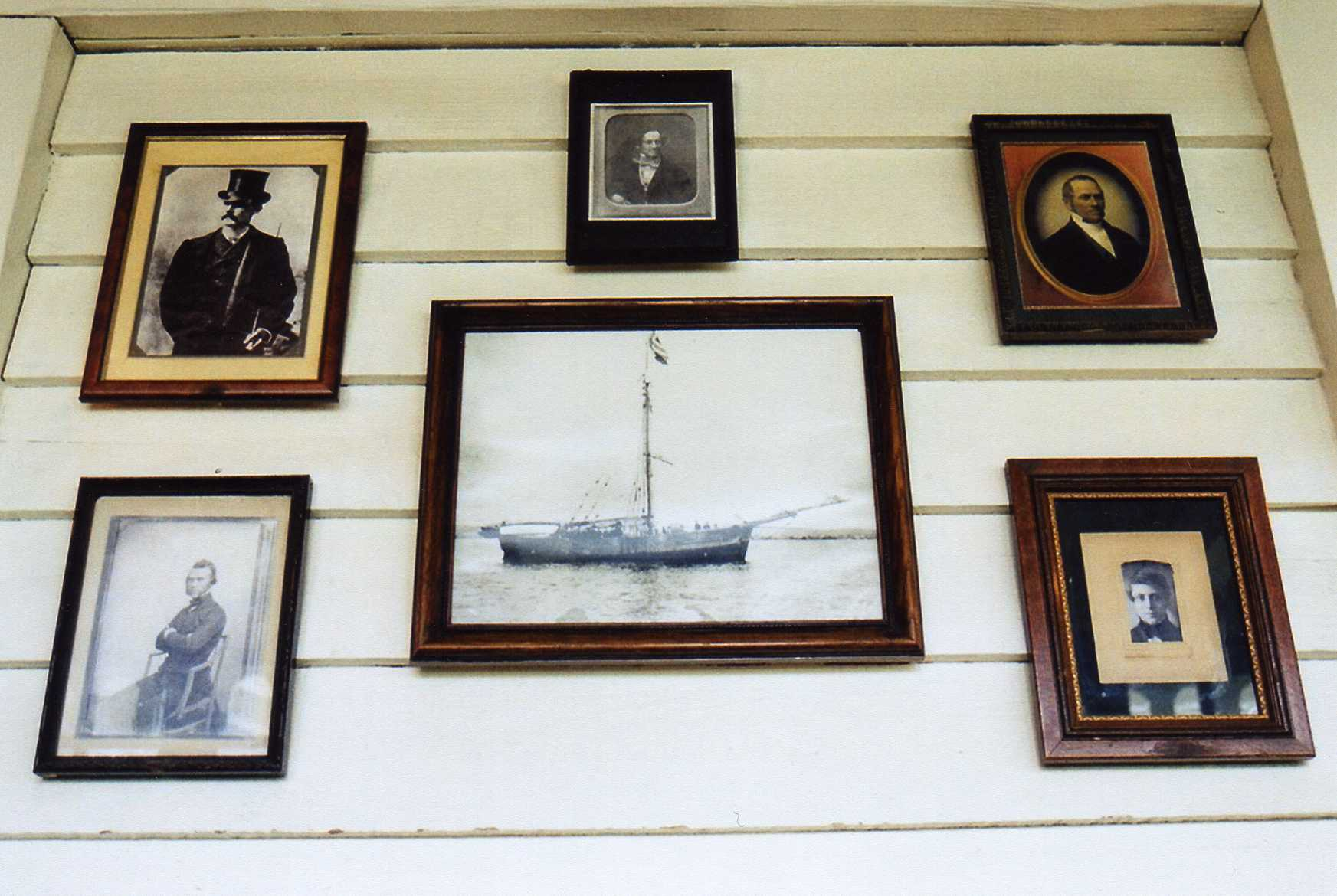
Photographs of Explorers displayed in the restaurant

At the opening of the park, the building was originally known as Explorer's Club Restaurant. Set in a colonial estate in a lush jungle where adventurers rest and have meals, the Club allowed guests to encounter famous European explorers, portrayed by cast actors, like David Livingstone or Ernest Hemingway. The featured soundtrack fitted the theme, with tunes such as Theresien-Fanfare, Colonel Bogey March, Onward, Christian Soldiers, Royal Air Force March Past or Cavalry of the Steppes.

The Club features a wide outdoor setting area, with one part overlooking waterfalls, and an inside room complete with trees displaying animatronic birds and animals (which was reminiscent of the Tiki Room). Some of these animals even interacted with the actors. The room is also ornamented with artifacts from numerous exotic regions, and murals representing journeys around the world.

The meals were originally colonial-inspired, and delivered on table.

The nearby ride Indiana Jones and the Temple of Peril still displays in its queue line part items featuring the name Explorer's Club.

== Colonel Hathi's Pizza Outpost ==
In 1993, one year after the opening of the park, the decision was made to turn the restaurant into a counter service for East-Asian meals, since guests lacked interest in table meals. Some of the trees were removed to make way for counter services.

Then, in 1995, the restaurant became an eating place for pizzas and pastas. Its new chosen theme was Rudyard Kipling's Jungle Book, especially its Disney adaptation. Though not entirely, most of the original soundtrack was replaced with samples from this movie's one.

The restaurant retains many elements of the original Explorer's Club design. Its interior is themed as a gathering place for explorers and travelers, with historic-style travel artifacts, photographs, maps and murals depicting destinations and transportation around the world. References to the former restaurant remain incorporated into the building, including the initials "EC" for Explorer's Club on decorative features. One of the principal interior spaces contains tropical vegetation and animatronic parrots, reflecting design influences from Disney's Enchanted Tiki Room. The exterior is surrounded by dense vegetation and water features intended to integrate the building into the tropical environment of Adventureland.
