= Adventure Isle (Disneyland Paris) =

Artificial island in Adventureland

Coordinates: 48°52′21″N 2°46′25″E

Disneyland Park (Paris)
- Area: Adventureland
- Status: Operating
- Opening date: April 12, 1992

Ride statistics
- Attraction type: Walkthrough
- Designer: Walt Disney Imagineering
- Theme: Adventure, Pirates, Caribbean Islands
- Wheelchair accessible

Adventure Isle is an artificial island in the center of Adventureland at Disneyland Paris. It opened with the park in 1992.

== Summary ==
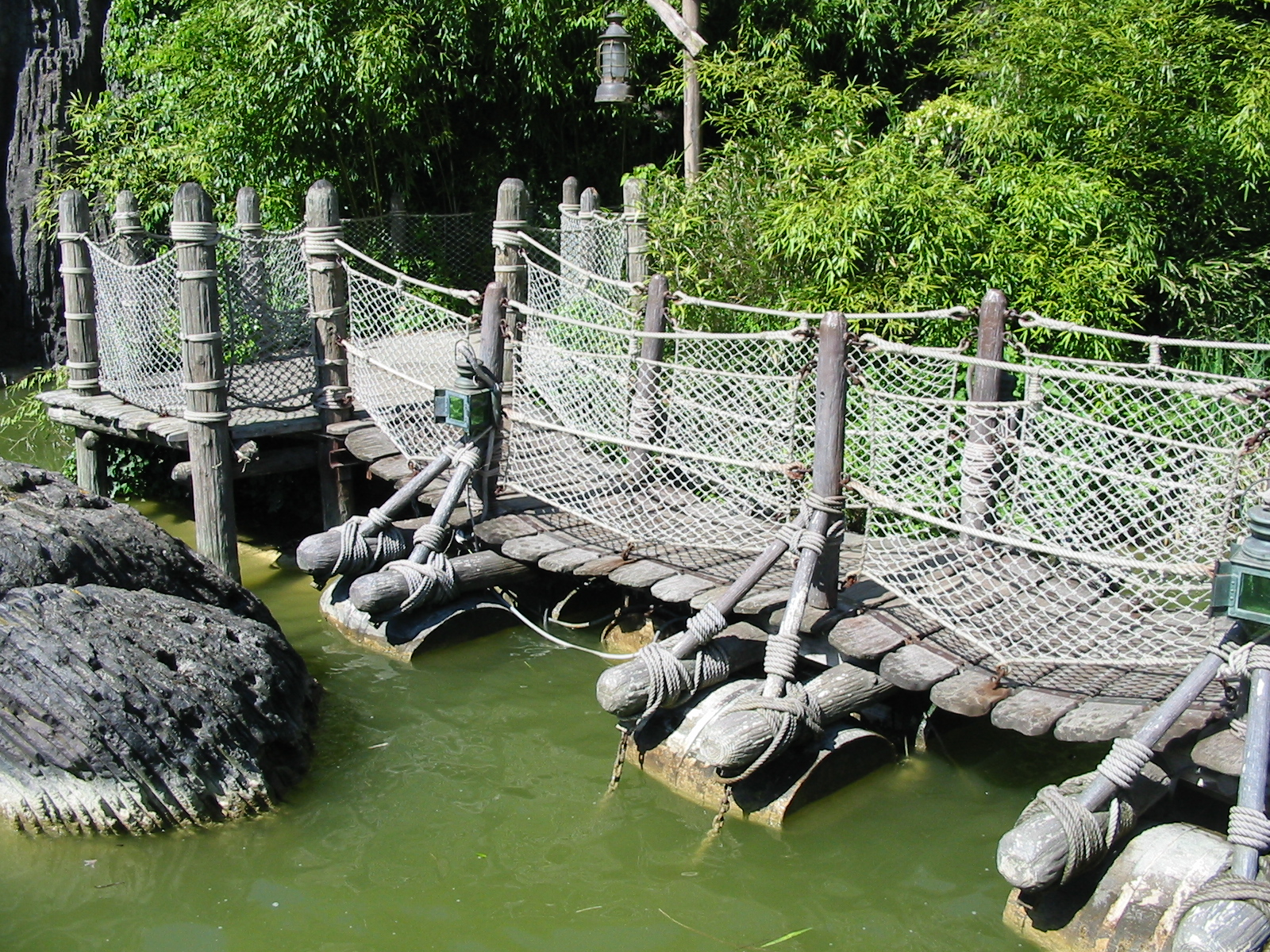
The Floating Bridge, linking the islands.

Adventure Isle is divided into two smaller islands:

=== Northern Island ===
This island is home to La Cabane des Robinson (Swiss Family Treehouse). This iteration of the attraction was given a more detailed environment. For example, under the tree guests can explore Le Ventre de la Terre (The Earth's Belly), a network of dark caves filled with roots from the tree above, which the Swiss Family uses as cellar. Also, in La Mer des Bretteurs (The Swordsmen Sea) nearby lies the wrecked ship the castaways originally used.

In this part, French is used as the main language. An elevated wooden bridge and another floating one link this island to the Southern one.

=== Southern Island ===
This is a more rocky landscape, featuring Captain Hook's Pirate Ship moored near Skull Rock and inspired by the 1953 Disney film Peter Pan. This is where guests can meet the infamous pirate along with Mr. Smee. A small playground area lies near the ship, called La Plage des Pirates (Pirates Beach).

A large mountain, known as Spyglass Hill, stands on this part, and is mainly composed of mazes and caves. A treasure is hidden inside. Some caves refer to the 1950 Disney movie Treasure Island (one is called Ben Gunn's Cave). There is also a small creek in this area called Frenchman's Creek and inspired by the English novel of the same name.

English is the main language within this section of the attraction.

== Development ==
When creating Disneyland Paris, Imagineers decided Big Thunder Mountain would be the centerpiece of Frontierland. As such, finding a new spot of land for Tom Sawyer Island became mandatory. In the end, Imagineers decided that an Adventureland-themed island, complete with the Swiss Family Treehouse, would fit as a centerpiece in Adventureland. In order to create a realistic Spyglass Hill, Imagineers went searching for actual rocks in storehouses around France and bought them, much to the owner's surprise.
