= Hakuna =

Scientific classification
- Domain: Eukaryota
- Kingdom: Animalia
- Phylum: Arthropoda
- Class: Insecta
- Order: Hymenoptera
- Family: Eulophidae
- Genus: Hakuna; Gumovsky & Boucek, 2006
- Species: H. matata

Binomial name
- Hakuna matata Gumovsky & Bouček, 2006

Genus of wasps

Hakuna is a genus of chalcid wasps from the family Eulophidae, containing the only species Hakuna matata. It was named in 2006 from specimens reared from a plant gall collected in a forest in Uganda. H. matata was named after a catchphrase from Disney's 1994 animated film The Lion King (the phrase itself comes from the Swahili phrase Hakuna matata. It was thought that this naming would best convey "an African spirit".
