= Hakuna Matata Restaurant =

Restaurant at Disneyland Paris

Disneyland Park (Paris)
- Area: Adventureland
- Coordinates: 48°52′19″N 2°46′28″E
- Status: Operating
- Opening date: April 12, 1992

Ride statistics
- Attraction type: Restaurant
- Designer: Walt Disney Imagineering
- Theme: The Lion King
- Previous name: Aux Epices Enchantées (1992-1994)

Hakuna Matata Restaurant is a restaurant located in Adventureland in Disneyland Paris. It is themed to the 1994 film The Lion King.

== Aux Epices Enchantées ==
Originally, when the park opened in 1992, the restaurant was known as Aux Epices Enchantées (With Enchanted Spices). It is the main building of the African part of Adventureland and features many African artifacts in the setting of a peaceful jungle. Its original meals, however, could be inspired by Africa, Asia or the West Indies.

== Hakuna Matata Restaurant ==
With the release of the film The Lion King in 1994, the theme came through to link the restaurant to the Disney universe. As such, it was renamed "Hakuna Matata Restaurant" in March 1994. The building itself remained unaltered, except for murals of the characters Timon and Pumbaa which were added later.
