= Sidney Lumet filmography =

List of works by American filmmaker Sidney Lumet

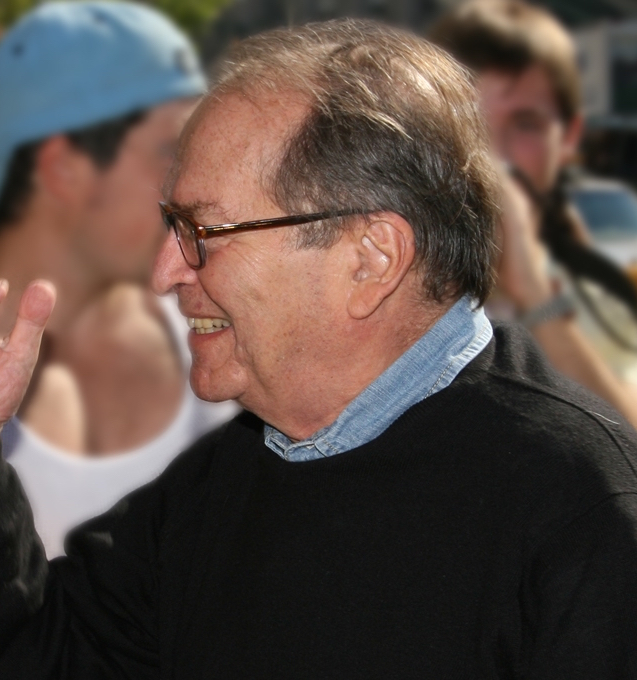
Sidney Lumet at the 2007 Toronto International Film Festival

Sidney Lumet (1924–2011) was an American film director.

Lumet's most known films include: the courtroom drama 12 Angry Men (1957); the Holocaust drama The Pawnbroker (1964); the Cold War thriller Fail Safe (1964); the crime dramas Serpico (1973) and Dog Day Afternoon (1975); the satirical news drama Network (1976); the psychological drama Equus (1977); the New York City police internal-affairs drama Prince of the City (1981); the legal drama The Verdict (1982); and the crime thriller Before the Devil Knows You're Dead (2007).

== Film ==
Year	Title	Director	Writer	Producer
1957	12 Angry Men	Yes	No	No
1958	Stage Struck	Yes	No	No
1959	That Kind of Woman	Yes	No	No
1960	The Fugitive Kind	Yes	No	No
1962	A View from the Bridge	Yes	No	No
1962	Long Day's Journey into Night	Yes	No	No
1964	The Pawnbroker	Yes	No	No
1964	Fail Safe	Yes	No	No
1965	The Hill	Yes	No	No
1966	The Group	Yes	No	No
1967	The Deadly Affair	Yes	No	Yes
1968	Bye Bye Braverman	Yes	No	Yes
1968	The Sea Gull	Yes	No	Yes
1969	The Appointment	Yes	No	No
1970	Last of the Mobile Hot Shots	Yes	No	Yes
1971	The Anderson Tapes	Yes	No	No
1972	Child's Play	Yes	No	No
1973	The Offence	Yes	No	No
1973	Serpico	Yes	No	No
1974	Lovin' Molly	Yes	No	No
1974	Murder on the Orient Express	Yes	No	No
1975	Dog Day Afternoon	Yes	No	No
1976	Network	Yes	No	No
1977	Equus	Yes	No	No
1978	The Wiz	Yes	No	No
1980	Just Tell Me What You Want	Yes	No	Yes
1981	Prince of the City	Yes	Yes	No
1982	Deathtrap	Yes	No	No
1982	The Verdict	Yes	No	No
1983	Daniel	Yes	No	Executive
1984	Garbo Talks	Yes	No	No
1986	Power	Yes	No	No
1986	The Morning After	Yes	No	No
1988	Running on Empty	Yes	No	No
1989	Family Business	Yes	No	No
1990	Q&A	Yes	Yes	No
1992	A Stranger Among Us	Yes	No	No
1993	Guilty as Sin	Yes	No	No
1996	Night Falls on Manhattan	Yes	Yes	No
1997	Critical Care	Yes	No	Yes
1999	Gloria	Yes	No	No
2006	Find Me Guilty	Yes	Yes	No
2007	Before the Devil Knows You're Dead	Yes	No	No

Acting roles

- ...One Third of a Nation... (1939)
- The Manchurian Candidate (2004)

Uncredited

- King: A Filmed Record... Montgomery to Memphis (1970)

Sources: Turner Classic Movies & Internet Movie Database

== Television ==
Year	Title	Notes
1952	CBS Television Workshop	Episode: Don Quixote
1951-52	Crime Photographer	2 episodes
1951-53	Danger	11 episodes
1954	Mama	2 episodes
1953-55	You Are There	14 episodes
1954-55	The Best of Broadway	3 episodes
1955	The Elgin Hour	2 episodes
1955	Star Stage	Episode: A Letter to Mr. Priest
1955	Frontier	Episode: In Nebraska
1956	The Alcoa Hour	5 episodes
1956	Goodyear Playhouse	2 episodes
1958	Kraft Theatre	5 episodes
1957-58	The DuPont Show of the Month	2 episodes
1955-59	The United States Steel Hour	3 episodes
1960	Play of the Week	4 episodes
1960	Sunday Showcase	2 episodes
1960	Playhouse 90	2 episodes
2001–02	100 Centre Street	9 episodes; Also writer, executive producer and creator

TV movies

- The Challenge (1955)
- Mr. Broadway (1957) (Also producer)
- Hans Brinker and the Silver Skates (1958) (Co-directed with George Schaefer)
- All the King's Men (1958)
- John Brown's Raid (1960)
- The Iceman Cometh (1960)
- Strip Search (2004)

== Theatre ==
Actor

Year	Title	Role	Venue
1935	Dead End	Small Boy	Belasco Theatre
1937	The Eternal Road	Estranged One's Son	Manhattan Opera House
1938	Sunup to Sundown	Stanley	Hudson Theatre
1938	Schoolhouse on the Lot	Mickey	Ritz Theatre
1939	My Heart's in the Highlands	Johnny	Guild Theatre
1939	Christmas Eve	Leo	Henry Miller's Theatre
1940	Morning Star	Hymie Tashman	Longacre Theatre
1940	Journey to Jerusalem	Jeshua	National Theatre
1941	Brooklyn, U.S.A.	Willie Berg	Forrest Theatre
1948	Seeds in the Wind	Tonya	Empire Theatre

Director

Year	Title	Venue
1956	Night of the Auk	Playhouse Theatre
1960	Caligula	54th Street Theatre
1962	Nowhere to Go But Up	Winter Garden Theatre

Source: Playbill & Internet Broadway Database
