= Lumet =

Lumet is a surname. Notable people with the surname include:

- Baruch Lumet (1898–1992), Polish-American actor
- Gail Lumet Buckley (1937–2024), American journalist
- Jenny Lumet (born 1967), American actress and screenwriter
- Sidney Lumet (1924–2011), American filmmaker
