= Silvercup Studios =

Film and television production facility in New York City

Coordinates: 40°45′4″N 73°56′38″W

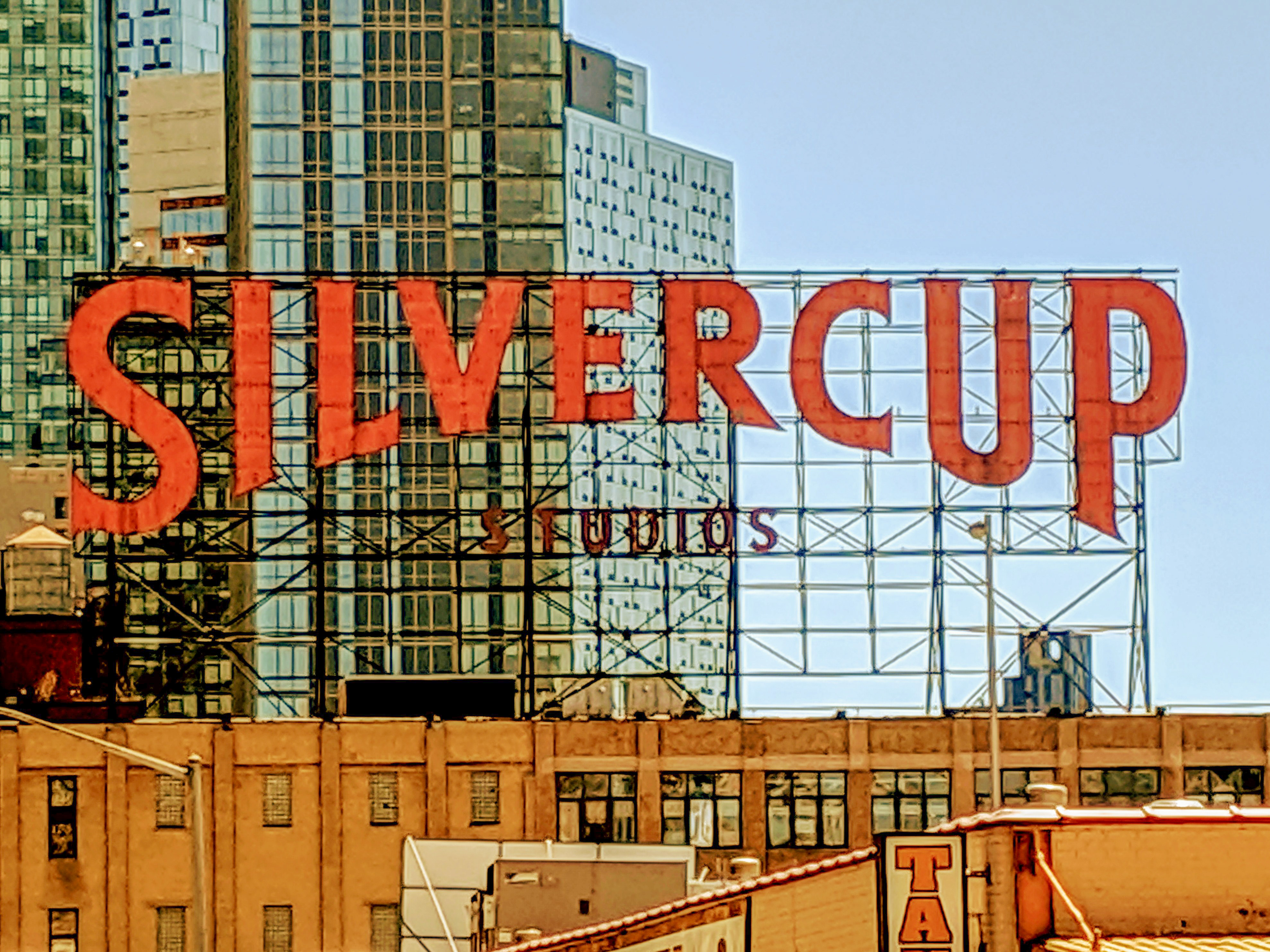
- Type: Studio
- Industry: Entertainment
- Founded: Queens, New York, US (1983)
- Founders: Stuart Suna; Alan Suna
- Headquarters: New York City, United States
- Products: Motion pictures, television programs
- Website: www.silvercupstudios.com

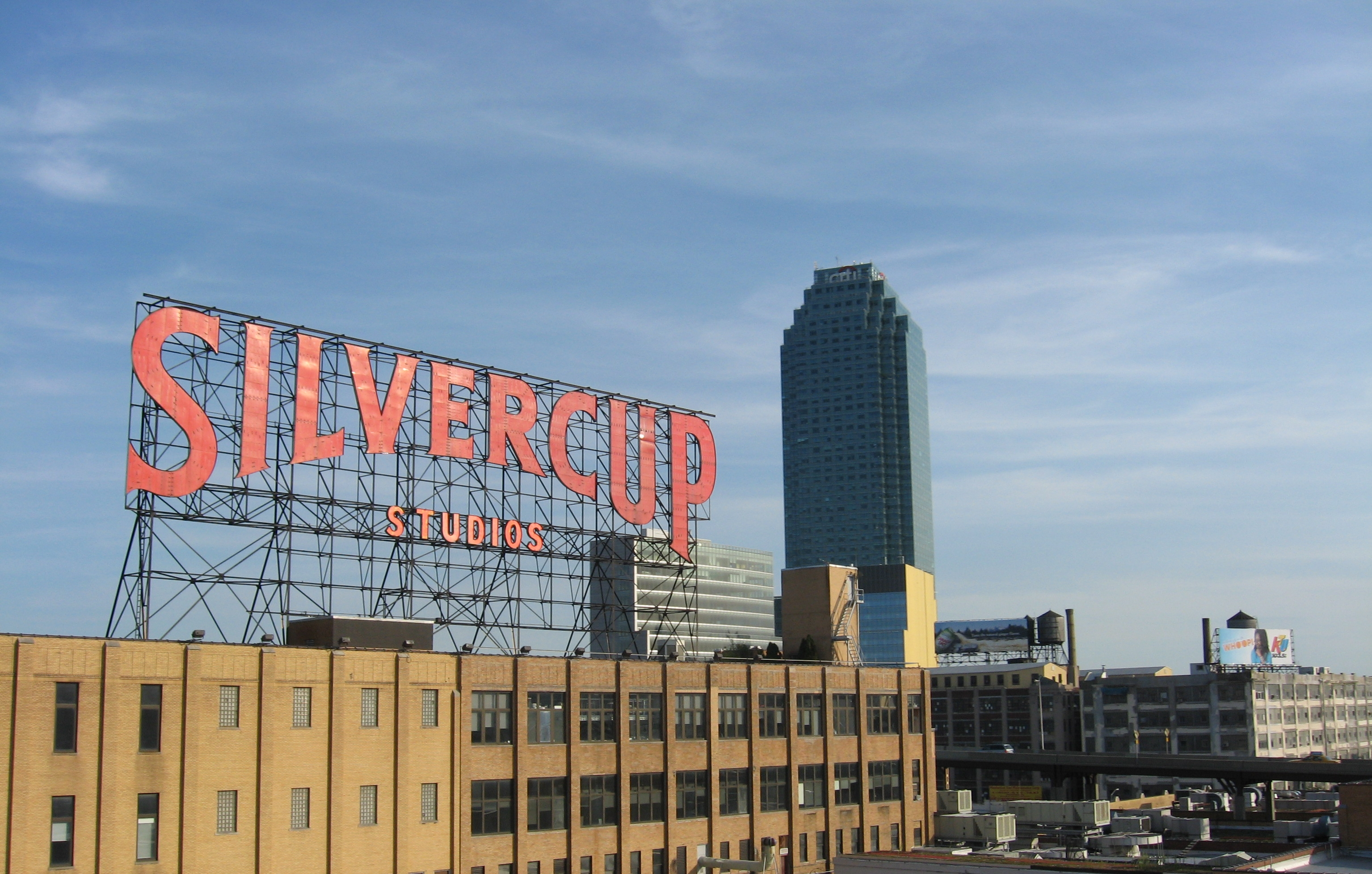
Main building

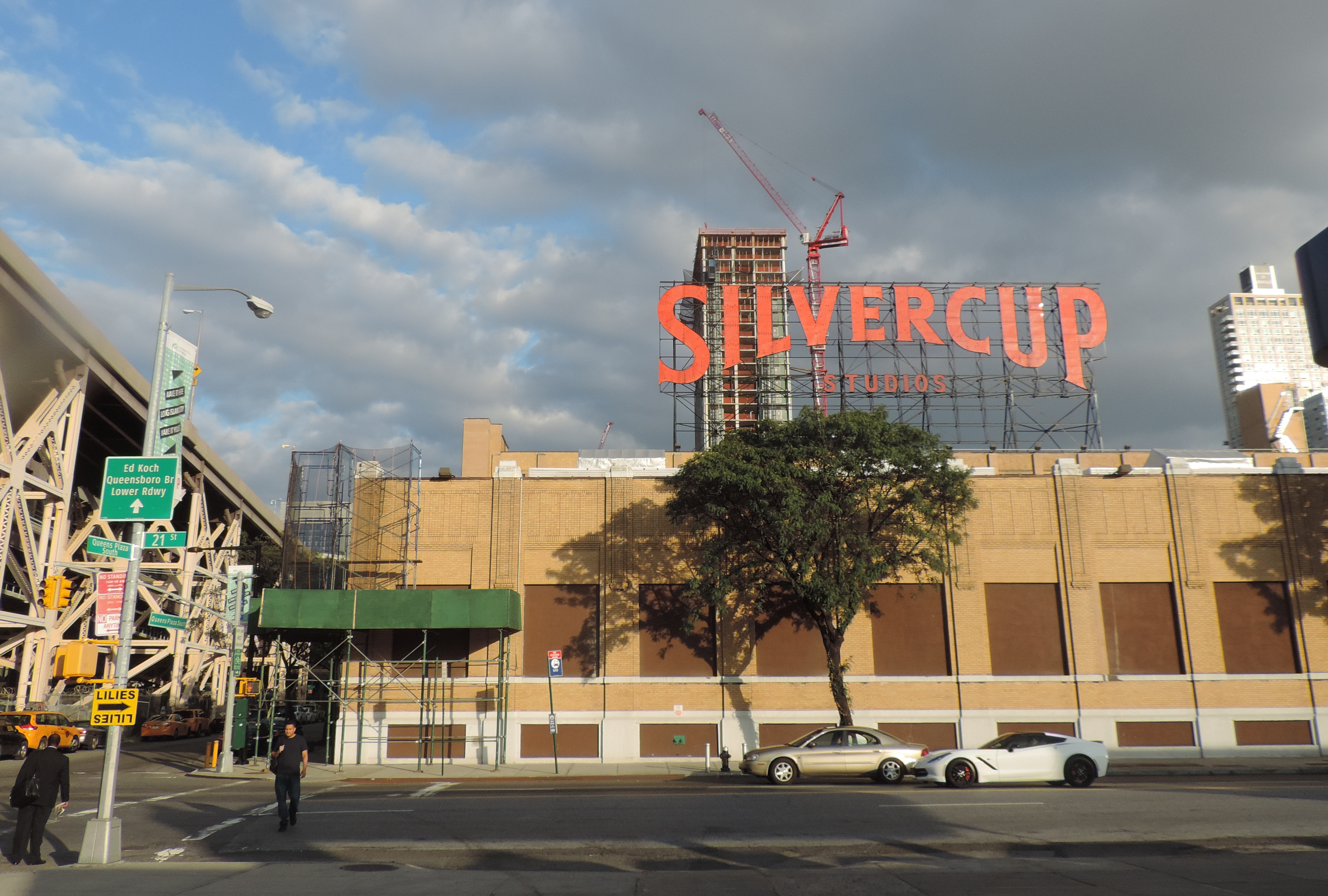
Street entrance

Silvercup Studios is a film and television production facility in New York City. The studio is located in Long Island City, Queens, with another facility in the Port Morris neighborhood of the Bronx. The studio complex has been operating since 1983 in the former Silvercup Bakery building. It was founded by brothers Alan and Stuart Suna.

== History ==
=== Silvercup bakery ===
For many decades of the 20th century, Long Island City was a center for commercial bakeries. During the 1920s building boom on Long Island, the Gordon Baking Company of Detroit made plans to open a factory at 42-25 21st Street to produce its Silvercup brand of bread. After the award of a $1 million contract for its construction in 1929, the building was completed the following year. At its peak, the facility reportedly provided about one third of the bread consumed in the metropolitan area of New York, and supplied New York City's schools. It closed in 1975 as a result of an industrial dispute with the Teamsters union. The neon advertising sign on the roof, which dates from around 1961–62, was visible across the East River in Manhattan.

=== Film studios ===
During its early years the facility was used mostly for the filming of music videos and commercials, although occasionally scenes for motion pictures were shot there, including Highlander and Garbo Talks. Norman Leigh, well known among New York City filmmakers for his electrical/gaffing work on the 1969 film Midnight Cowboy, oversaw the studio during its first few years.

Over the years, use of the studio's space has shifted toward the production of television series.

== Productions ==
Silvercup was the primary shooting facility for ABC's Hope & Faith, and HBO's Sex and the City and The Sopranos. The finale of the 1986 film Highlander took place at Silvercup with an action sequence on its famous rooftop signage. Other film and television productions that have made use of the studio include:

- Buonasera Raffaella
- 30 Rock
- Analyze That
- Big Daddy
- Big Lake
- Birth
- Black Rain
- Daredevil: Born Again
- Dark Water
- The Deuce
- The Devil Wears Prada
- Elementary
- Fosse/Verdon
- Fringe
- Gangs of New York
- Garbo Talks
- Gossip Girl
- Hide and Seek
- The Impostors
- Jonny Zero
- Julie & Julia
- Just My Luck
- King of New York
- Krush Groove
- The Last Dragon
- Little Children
- Little Nicky
- Mad Men
- Manifest
- Meet the Parents
- Mickey Blue Eyes
- The Michael J. Fox Show
- Mr. Robot
- The Mysteries of Laura
- No Reservations
- Person of Interest
- Private Parts
- The Punisher: One Last Kill
- Q2, Resource Television
- Quantico
- Righteous Kill
- The Savages
- Stuart Little 2
- The Snoop Sisters
- Two Weeks Notice
- Ugly Betty
- Uptown Girls
- What Happens in Vegas
- White Collar
