= List of awards and nominations received by Sidney Lumet =

Sidney Lumet awards and nominations
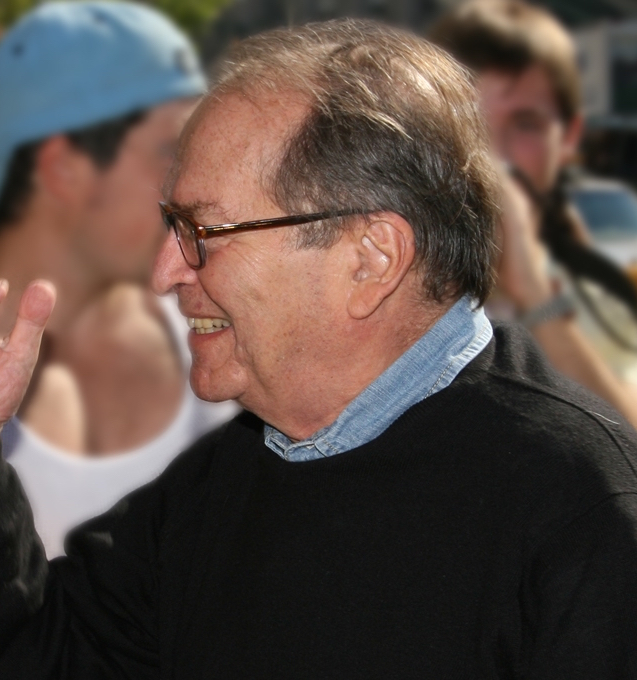
- Lumet in 2007
Awards and nominations
| Award | Wins | Nominations |
| Academy Awards | 1 | 6 |
| BAFTA Awards | 0 | 9 |
| Golden Globes | 1 | 6 |
| Emmy Awards | 0 | 1 |

Totals (Note: Certain award groups do not simply award one winner. They acknowledge several different recipients, have runners-up, and have third place. Since this is a specific recognition and is different from losing an award, runner-up mentions are considered wins in this award tally. For simplification and to avoid errors, each award in this list has been presumed to have had a prior nomination.)
- Wins: 50
- Nominations: 100

Sidney Lumet is an American film director. He received several awards including an Academy Honorary Award and a Golden Globe Award as well as nominations for nine British Academy Film Awards and a Primetime Emmy Award.

Lumet's most known films include the courtroom drama 12 Angry Men (1957), the Holocaust drama The Pawnbroker (1964), the Cold War thriller Fail Safe (1964), the crime dramas Serpico (1973), and Dog Day Afternoon (1975) as well as the satirical news drama Network (1976), the psychological drama Equus (1977), the legal drama The Verdict (1982), and the crime thriller Before the Devil Knows You're Dead (2007).

Lumet received five Academy Award nominations winning the Honorary Oscar in 2004. He also received nine British Academy Film Award nominations as well as six Golden Globe Award for Best Director nominations winning for Network (1975). In 1961 he received a Primetime Emmy Award for Outstanding Directing for a Drama Series nomination for his work on NBC Sunday Showcase.

== Major associations ==
=== Academy Awards ===
| Year | Category | Nominated work | Result | Ref. |
|---|---|---|---|---|
| 1957 | Best Director | 12 Angry Men | Nominated | |
| 1975 | Best Director | Dog Day Afternoon | Nominated | |
| 1976 | Best Director | Network | Nominated | |
| 1981 | Best Adapted Screenplay | Prince of the City | Nominated | |
| 1982 | Best Director | The Verdict | Nominated | |
| 2004 | Honorary Oscar | | Honored | |

=== BAFTA Awards ===
| Year | Category | Nominated work | Result | Ref. |
British Academy Film Awards
| 1966 | Best Film | The Hill | Nominated | |
| 1966 | Outstanding British Film | The Hill | Nominated | |
| 1966 | United Nations Award | Fail Safe | Nominated | |
| 1967 | United Nations Award | The Pawnbroker | Nominated | |
| 1968 | Outstanding British Film | The Deadly Affair | Nominated | |
| 1974 | Best Direction | Murder on the Orient Express / Serpico | Nominated | |
| 1975 | Best Film | Dog Day Afternoon | Nominated | |
| 1975 | Best Direction | Dog Day Afternoon | Nominated | |
| 1977 | Best Film | Network | Nominated | |

=== Emmy Awards ===
| Year | Category | Nominated work | Result | Ref. |
Primetime Emmy Awards
| 1961 | Outstanding Directing in a Drama Series | NBC Sunday Showcase | Nominated | |

=== Golden Globe Awards ===
| Year | Category | Nominated work | Result | Ref. |
|---|---|---|---|---|
| 1957 | Best Director | 12 Angry Men | Nominated | |
| 1975 | Best Director | Dog Day Afternoon | Nominated | |
| 1976 | Best Director | Network | Won | |
| 1981 | Best Director | Prince of the City | Nominated | |
| 1982 | Best Director | The Verdict | Nominated | |
| 1989 | Best Director | Running on Empty | Nominated | |

== Festival awards ==
=== Cannes Film Festival ===
| Year | Category | Nominated work | Result | Ref. |
|---|---|---|---|---|
| 1962 | Palme d'Or | Long Day's Journey into Night | Nominated | |
| 1965 | Palme d'Or | The Hill | Nominated | |
| 1969 | Palme d'Or | The Appointment | Nominated | |
| 1992 | Palme d'Or | A Stranger Among Us | Nominated | |

=== Berlin International Film Festival ===
| Year | Category | Nominated work | Result | Ref. |
|---|---|---|---|---|
| 1957 | Golden Bear | 12 Angry Men | Won | |
| 1959 | Golden Bear | That Kind of Woman | Nominated | |
| 1964 | Golden Bear | Pawnbroker | Nominated | |
| 1966 | Golden Bear | The Group | Nominated | |
| 2006 | Golden Bear | Find Me Guilty | Nominated | |

=== Venice Film Festival ===
| Year | Category | Nominated work | Result | Ref. |
|---|---|---|---|---|
| 1981 | Golden Lion | Prince of the City | Nominated | |
