= Cannavale =

Cannavale is an Italian surname. Notable people with the surname include:

- Bobby Cannavale (born 1970), American actor, father of Jake and nephew of Enzo
- Enzo Cannavale (1928–2011), Italian actor
- Jake Cannavale (born 1995), American actor and musician, son of Bobby and grandnephew of Enzo
