= Gail Lumet Buckley =

American journalist (1937–2024)

- Born: Gail Horne Jones; December 21, 1937; Los Angeles, California, U.S.
- Died: July 18, 2024 (aged 86); Santa Monica, California, U.S.
- Education: Radcliffe College
- Occupations: Author, journalist
- Years active: 1960s–2010s
- Known for: Writing on African American history and culture
- Notable work: The Hornes: An American Family; American Patriots: The Story of Blacks in the Military from the Revolution to Desert Storm
- Spouses: Sidney Lumet (m. 1963; div. 1978); Kevin Buckley (m. 1983; died 2021)
- Parents: Lena Horne (mother); Louis Jordan Jones (father)
- Relatives: Jenny Lumet (daughter)

Gail Horne Jones Lumet Buckley (December 21, 1937 – July 18, 2024) was an American journalist and author.

== Early life and education ==
Gail Horne Jones was the only daughter of the singer and actress Lena Horne and political activist Louis Jordan Jones. She was born in Pittsburgh, Pennsylvania, but spent time in New York and California. She was raised Catholic. She graduated from Radcliffe College with a bachelor's degree in 1959.

== Career ==
Jones interned at Marie Claire in Paris before returning to the United States. She was hired by Life magazine in 1962. Later, she was published in newspapers including The New York Times and the Los Angeles Times. She wrote her first book in 1986, entitled The Hornes: An American Family.

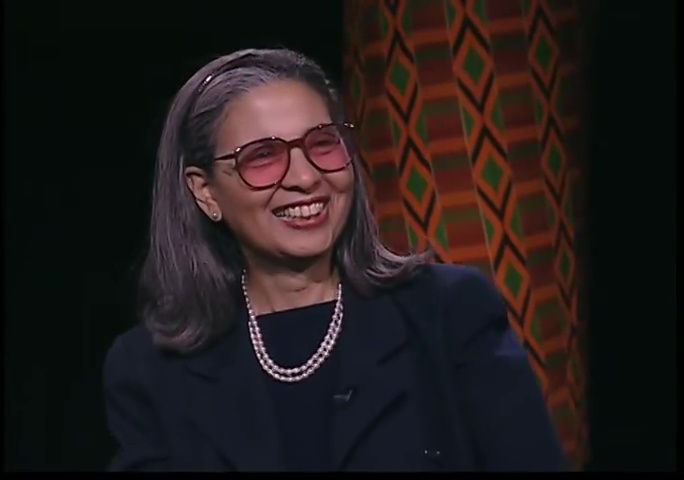
Buckley discusses her book "American Patriots" on CUNY TV's African American Legends, 2001

== Marriages ==
Jones was married to director Sidney Lumet from 1963 until 1978, when they divorced; they had two daughters, including Jenny Lumet. She was later married to journalist Kevin Buckley from 1983 until his death in 2021.

== Death ==
Gail Lumet Buckley died on July 18, 2024, at her home in Santa Monica, California, aged 86, from heart failure. She was survived by her two daughters (from her first marriage), Jenny and Amy, as well as two grandchildren, including Jake Cannavale.

== Books ==
- The Black Calhouns: From Civil War to Civil Rights with One African American Family
- American Patriots: The Story of Blacks in the Military from the Revolution to Desert Storm (2001)
- The Hornes: An American Family (1986)
- Radical Sanctity: Race and Radical Women in the American Catholic Church (2023)
