= Baruch Lumet =

Polish-American actor (1898–1992)

- Born: September 16, 1898; Warsaw, Congress Poland, Russian Empire
- Died: February 8, 1992 (aged 93)
- Years active: 1939–1980
- Spouse: Eugenia Wermus
- Children: 2, including Sidney
- Relatives: Jenny Lumet (granddaughter); Jake Cannavale (great-grandson)

Baruch Lumet (Burech Lumet; 16 September 1898 – 8 February 1992) was an American actor best known for his work in the Yiddish theatre.

== Early life ==
Lumet was born in Warsaw, then part of Congress Poland, to a Yiddish-speaking Jewish family. He immigrated to the United States from Poland with his wife Eugenia Gitl Lumet (née Wermus) and daughter Felicia (1920–1980) in 1922, where his son, film director Sidney Lumet (1924–2011), was born.

== Career ==
Although he appeared with his son in the film ...One Third of a Nation... in 1939, the elder Lumet made few film appearances, though he played character roles in two of Sidney's films from the 1960s, The Pawnbroker (1964) and The Group (1966). He also appeared in Woody Allen's comedy Everything You Always Wanted to Know About Sex but Were Afraid to Ask, improbably cast as an elderly rabbi with a bondage fetish.

From 1953 to 1960, Lumet was the director of the Dallas Institute of Performing Arts and the Knox Street Theater in Dallas. Among his students were Jayne Mansfield and Tobe Hooper.

== Filmography ==
Year	Title	Role	Notes
1939	...One Third of a Nation...	Mr. Rosen	
1950	Cody of the Pony Express	Frenchy	Serial, Uncredited
1959	The Killer Shrews	Dr. Marlowe Craigis	
1961	Alfred Hitchcock Presents	Concertina Player	Season 6 Episode 14: "The Changing Heart"
1961	Alfred Hitchcock Presents	Man on Stairs	Season 6 Episode 18: "The Greatest Monster of Them All"
1962	Hemingway's Adventures of a Young Man	Morris	Uncredited
1962	The Interns	Byrd	Uncredited
1964	The Pawnbroker	Mendel	
1966	The Group	Mr. Schneider	
1972	Everything You Always Wanted to Know About Sex but Were Afraid to Ask	Rabbi Baumel	
1975	The Wild Party	Tailor	

== Sources ==
- Finding Aid for the Baruch Lumet Papers, 1955-1983, Online Archive of California
