= Sidney Lumet =

American filmmaker (1924–2011)

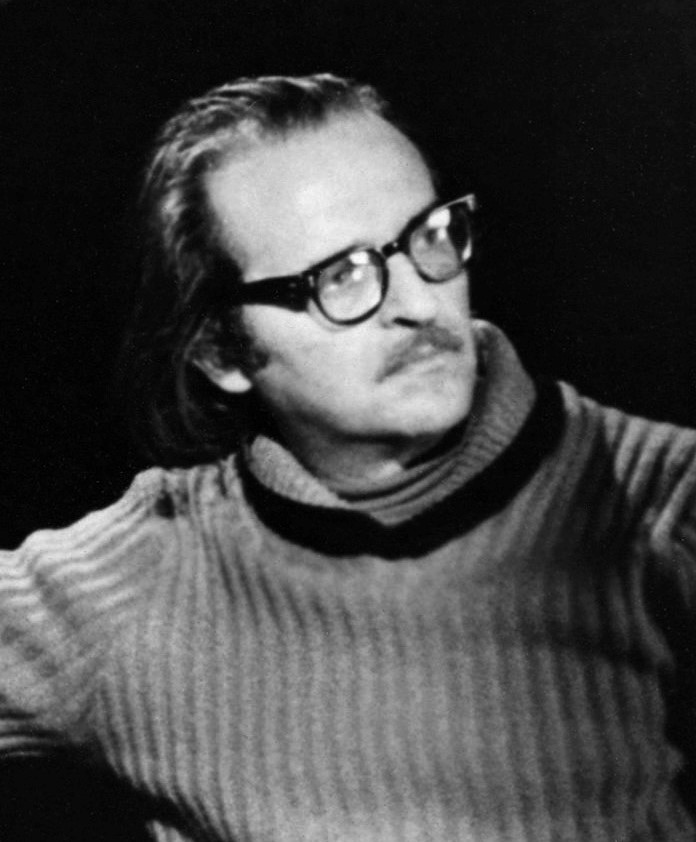
- Lumet in 1970
- Born: Sidney Arthur Lumet; June 25, 1924; Philadelphia, Pennsylvania, U.S.
- Died: April 9, 2011 (aged 86); New York City, New York, U.S.
- Education: Columbia University
- Occupations: Film director; screenwriter; producer; actor
- Years active: 1930–2007
- Works: Full list
- Spouses: Rita Gam (m. 1949; div. 1955) Gloria Vanderbilt (m. 1956; div. 1963) Gail Jones (m. 1963; div. 1978) Mary Gimbel (m. 1980)
- Children: 2, including Jenny
- Father: Baruch Lumet
- Relatives: Jake Cannavale (grandson)
- Awards: Full list

Sidney Arthur Lumet (/luːˈmɛt/ loo-MET; June 25, 1924 – April 9, 2011) was an American film director. Lumet started his career in theatre before moving to directing television in 1950, and then directing films from 1957, where he gained a reputation for making realistic and gritty New York dramas that focused on the working class, tackled social injustices, and often questioned authority. He received various accolades including an Academy Honorary Award and a Golden Globe Award as well as nominations for nine British Academy Film Awards and a Primetime Emmy Award.

He was nominated five times for Academy Awards: four for Best Director for the legal drama 12 Angry Men (1957), the crime drama Dog Day Afternoon (1975), the satirical drama Network (1976) and the legal thriller The Verdict (1982), and one for Best Adapted Screenplay for Prince of the City (1981). Other films include A View from the Bridge (1962), Long Day's Journey into Night (1962), The Pawnbroker (1964), Fail Safe (1964), The Hill (1965), Serpico (1973), Murder on the Orient Express (1974), Equus (1977), The Wiz (1978), The Morning After (1986), Running on Empty (1988) and Before the Devil Knows You're Dead (2007). He received the Academy Honorary Award in 2004.

A member of the inaugural class at New York's Actors Studio, Lumet started acting Off-Broadway and made his Broadway acting debut in the 1935 play Dead End. He went on to direct the Broadway plays Night of the Auk (1956), Caligula (1960) and Nowhere to Go But Up (1962). Lumet is also known for his work on television. He received a Primetime Emmy Award for Outstanding Directing for a Drama Series nomination for NBC Sunday Showcase (1961). He also directed for Goodyear Television Playhouse, Kraft Television Theatre and Playhouse 90.

== Life and career ==
=== Early years ===
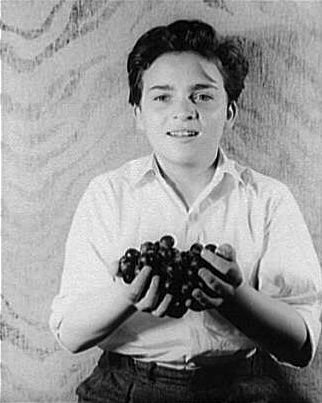
Lumet as a child, photographed by Carl Van Vechten

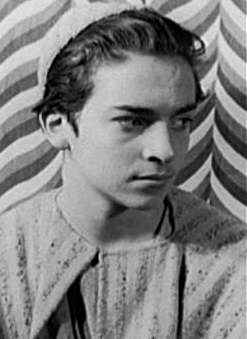
Lumet in the 1940 play Journey to Jerusalem

Lumet was born in Philadelphia and grew up on the Lower East Side of Manhattan. He studied theater acting at the Professional Children's School of New York and Columbia University.

Lumet's parents, Baruch and Eugenia (née Wermus) Lumet, were Jewish and veterans of the Yiddish theatre; they had immigrated to the United States from Poland. His father, an actor, director, producer and writer, was born in Warsaw. Lumet's mother, who was a dancer, died when he was a child. He had an older sister. Lumet made his professional debut on the radio at age four and his stage debut at the Yiddish Art Theatre at age five. As a child, he also appeared in many Broadway productions, including 1935's Dead End and Kurt Weill's The Eternal Road.

In 1935, aged 11, Lumet appeared in a Henry Lynn short film Papirossen (meaning "Cigarettes" in Yiddish), co-produced by radio star Herman Yablokoff. The film was shown in a theatrical play with the same title, based on the song "Papirosn". The play and short film appeared at the Bronx's McKinley Square Theatre. In 1939, at age 15, he made his only feature-length film appearance in ...One Third of a Nation....

World War II interrupted Lumet's early acting career and he spent four years in the U.S. Army. After returning from service as a radar repairman stationed in India and Burma (1942–1946), he became involved with the Actors Studio, then formed his own theater workshop. He organized an Off-Broadway group and became its director, and continued directing in summer stock theatre while teaching acting at the High School of Performing Arts. He was the senior drama coach at the new 46th Street building of "Performing Arts". The 25-year-old Lumet directed the drama department in a production of The Young and Fair.

=== Early career ===
Lumet began his directorial career with Off-Broadway productions and evolved into a highly efficient television director. He began directing television in 1950 after working as an assistant to friend and then-director Yul Brynner. He soon developed a "lightning quick" method for shooting due to the high turnover required by television. As a result, while working for CBS, he directed hundreds of episodes of Danger (1950–1955), Mama (1949–1957) and You Are There (1953–1957), the latter a weekly series that featured Walter Cronkite in one of his early television appearances. Lumet chose Cronkite for the role of anchorman "because the premise of the show was so silly, was so outrageous, that we needed somebody with the most American, homespun, warm ease about him", he said.

He also directed original plays for Playhouse 90, Kraft Television Theatre and Studio One, directing approximately 200 episodes, which established him as "one of the most prolific and respected directors in the business", according to Turner Classic Movies. His ability to work quickly while shooting carried over to his film career. Because the quality of many television dramas was so impressive, several of them were later adapted as motion pictures.

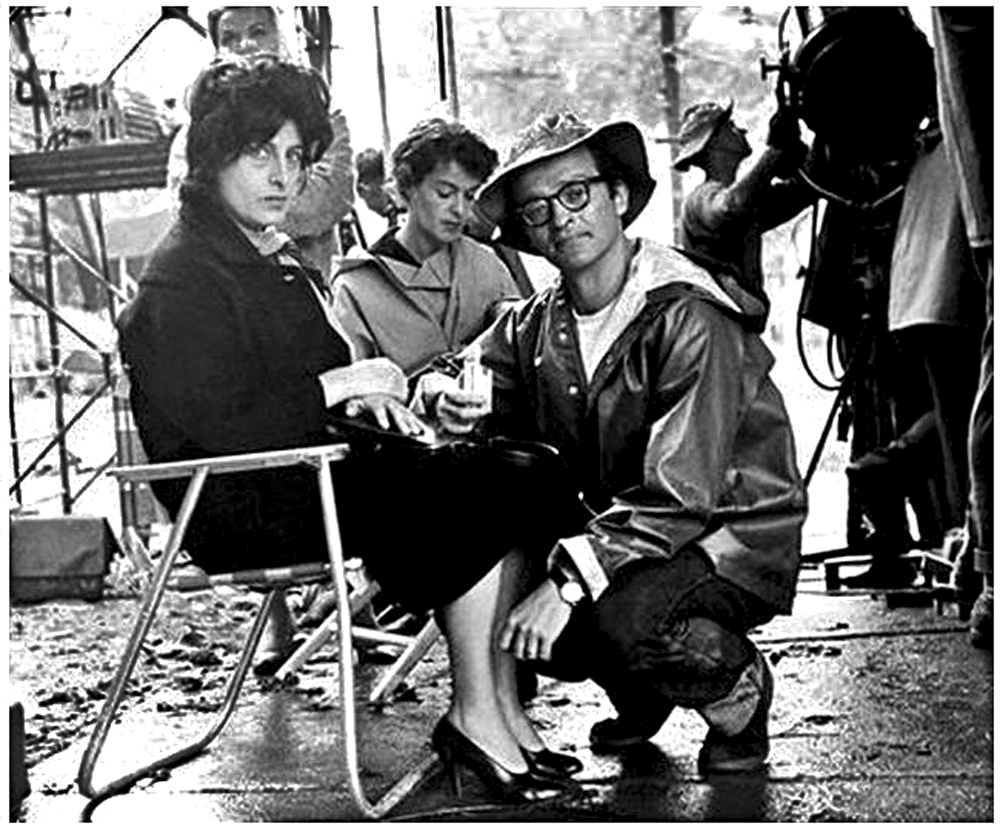
Directing Anna Magnani in The Fugitive Kind (1960)

His first movie, 12 Angry Men (1957), a courtroom drama centered on a tense jury deliberation that was based on a CBS live play, was an auspicious beginning for Lumet. It was a critical success and established him as a director skilled at adapting properties from other mediums to motion pictures. Fully half of Lumet's complement of films originated in the theater.

Following his first film, Lumet divided his energies among political and social drama films, as well as adaptations of literary plays and novels, big stylish stories, New York-based black comedies and realistic crime dramas (including Serpico and Prince of the City). As a result of directing 12 Angry Men, he was also responsible for leading the first wave of directors who made a successful transition from TV to movies.

A controversial TV show that he directed in 1960 gained some notoriety: Sacco-Vanzetti Story on NBC. According to The New York Times, the drama drew flack from the state of Massachusetts (where Sacco and Vanzetti were tried and executed) because it was thought to postulate that the condemned murderers were, in fact, wholly innocent. However, the resulting controversy did Lumet more good than harm, sending several prestigious film assignments his way.

He began adapting classic plays for both film and television, directing Marlon Brando, Joanne Woodward and Anna Magnani in the feature film The Fugitive Kind (1959), based on the Tennessee Williams play Orpheus Descending. He directed a live television version of Eugene O'Neill's The Iceman Cometh, which was followed by his film A View from the Bridge (1962), another psychological drama, from the play written by Arthur Miller. This was followed by another Eugene O'Neill play-turned-to-cinema, Long Day's Journey into Night (1962), with Katharine Hepburn earning an Oscar nomination for her performance as a drug-addicted housewife; the four principal actors swept the acting awards at the 1962 Cannes Film Festival.

== Directing style and subjects ==
=== Realism and energetic style ===
Film critic Owen Gleiberman observed that Lumet was a "hardboiled straight-shooter" who, because he was trained during the Golden Age of Television in the 1950s, became noted for his energetic style of directing. The words, "Sidney Lumet" and "energy", he added, became synonymous. "The energy was there in the quietest moments. It was an inner energy, a hum of existence that Lumet observed in people and brought out in them...[when he] went into the New York streets...he made them electric." He also wrote:

It was a working class outer-borough energy. Lumet's streets were just as mean as Scorsese's, but Lumet's seemed plain rather than poetic. He channeled that New York skeezy vitality with such natural force that it was easy to overlook what was truly involved in the achievement. He captured that New York vibe like no one else because he saw it, lived it, breathed it – but then he had to go out and stage it, or re-create it, almost as if he were staging a documentary, letting his actors square off like random predators, insisting on the most natural light possible, making offices look as ugly and bureaucratic as they were because he knew, beneath that, that they weren't just offices but lairs, and that there was a deeper intensity, almost a kind of beauty, to catching the coarseness of reality as it truly looked.

=== Collaboration ===
Describing a scene with Treat Williams in Prince of the City (1981)

"Lumet generally insisted on the collaborative nature of the film, sometimes ridiculing the dominance of the 'personal' director," wrote film historian Frank R. Cunningham. As a result, Lumet became renowned among both actors and cinematographers for his openness to sharing creative ideas with the writer, actors and other artists. Lumet "has no equal in the distinguished direction of superior actors", added Cunningham, with many coming from the theater. He was able to draw powerful performances from actors, such as Ralph Richardson, Marlon Brando, Richard Burton, Katharine Hepburn, James Mason, Sophia Loren, Geraldine Fitzgerald, Blythe Danner, Rod Steiger, Vanessa Redgrave, Paul Newman, Sean Connery, Henry Fonda, Dustin Hoffman, Albert Finney, Simone Signoret and Anne Bancroft. "Give him a good actor, and he just might find the great actor lurking within," wrote film critic Mick LaSalle.

When necessary, Lumet chose untrained actors, but he stated that "over ninety percent of the time, I want the best tools I can get: actors, writers, lighting men, cameramen, propmen". Nonetheless, when he did use less experienced actors, he could still bring out superior and memorable acting performances. He did with Nick Nolte, Anthony Perkins, Armand Assante, Jane Fonda, Faye Dunaway, Timothy Hutton and Ali MacGraw, who referred to him as "every actor's dream". In Jane Fonda's opinion, "He was a master. Such control of his craft. He had strong, progressive values and never betrayed them."

While the goal of all movies is to entertain, the kind of film in which I believe goes one step further. It compels the spectator to examine one facet or another of his own conscience. It stimulates thought and sets the mental juices flowing.

— Sidney Lumet

Lumet believed that movies are an art, and "the amount of attention paid to movies is directly related to pictures of quality". Because he started his career as an actor, he became known as an "actor's director" and worked with the best of them over the years, a roster probably unequaled by any other director. Acting scholar Frank P. Tomasulo agreed and pointed out that many directors who are able to understand acting from an actor's perspective were all "great communicators".

According to film historians Gerald Mast and Bruce Kawin, Lumet's "sensitivity to actors and to the rhythms of the city have made him America's longest-lived descendant of the 1950s Neorealist tradition and its urgent commitment to ethical responsibility". They cited his film The Hill (1965) as "one of the most politically and morally radical films of the 1960s". They added that beneath the social conflicts of Lumet's films lies the "conviction that love and reason will eventually prevail in human affairs", and that "law and justice will eventually be served – or not". His debut film Twelve Angry Men was an acclaimed picture in its day, representing a model for liberal reason and fellowship during the 1950s. The film and Lumet were nominated for Academy Awards, and he was nominated for the Director's Guild Award.

The Encyclopedia of World Biography states that his films often featured actors who studied "Method acting", noted for portraying an earthy, introspective style. A leading example of such "Method" actors would be Al Pacino, who, early in his career, studied under Method acting guru Lee Strasberg. Lumet also preferred the appearance of spontaneity in both his actors and settings, which gave his films an improvisational look by shooting much of his work on location.

=== Rehearsal and preparation ===
Lumet was a strong believer in rehearsal and felt that if an actor rehearsed correctly, the actor would not lose spontaneity. According to critic Ian Bernard, Lumet felt that it gives actors the "entire arc of the role", which gives them the freedom to find that "magical accident". Director Peter Bogdanovich asked him whether he rehearsed extensively before shooting, and Lumet said that he liked to rehearse a minimum of two weeks before filming. During those weeks, recalls Faye Dunaway, who starred in Network (1976), he also blocked the scenes with his cameraman. As a result, she added that "not a minute is wasted while he's shooting, and that shows not only on the studio's budget, but it shows on the impetus of performance". She praised his style of directing in Network, in which she won her only Academy Award:

Sidney, let me say, is one of, if not, the most talented and professional men in the world...and acting in Network was one of the happiest experiences I have ever had...He's a really gifted man who contributed a good deal to my performance.

Partly because his actors were well rehearsed, he could execute a production in rapid order, which kept his productions within their modest budgets. When filming Prince of the City (1981), for example, although there were over 130 speaking roles and 135 different locations, he was able to coordinate the entire shoot in 52 days. As a result, wrote historians Charles Harpole and Thomas Schatz, performers were eager to work with him, for they considered him to be an "outstanding director of actors". The film's star Treat Williams said that Lumet was known for being "energetic":

He was just a ball of fire. He had passion for what he did and he "came to work" with all barrels burning. He's probably the most prepared director I've ever worked with emotionally. His films always came in under schedule and under budget. And everybody got home for dinner.

Harpole added that "whereas many directors disliked rehearsals or advising actors on how to build their character, Lumet excelled at both". He could thereby more easily give his performers a cinematic showcase for their abilities and help them deepen their acting contribution. Actor Christopher Reeve, who co-starred in Deathtrap (1982), also pointed out that Lumet knew how to talk technical language: "If you want to work that way – he knows how to talk Method, he knows how to improvise, and he does it all equally well".

As a movie goes on, it gets more and more grueling and you really need a director who will help remind you where your character is at all times. Sidney Lumet was like that. All wonderful directors will do that.

— Al Pacino

Joanna Rapf, writing about the filming of The Verdict (1982), states that Lumet gave plenty of personal attention to his actors, whether listening to them or touching them. She describes how Lumet and star Paul Newman sat on a bench secluded from the main set, where Newman had taken his shoes off, to privately discuss an important scene about to be shot. Lumet's actors walked through their scenes before the camera rolled. This preparation was done because Lumet liked to shoot a scene in one take or two at the most. Newman liked to call him "Speedy Gonzales", adding that Lumet did not shoot more than he had to. "He doesn't give himself any protection. I know I would," Newman said.

Film critic Betsy Sharkey agreed, adding that "he was a maestro of one or two takes years before Clint Eastwood would turn it into a respected specialty". Sharkey recalls, "[Faye] Dunaway once told me that Lumet worked so fast it was as if he were on roller skates. A racing pulse generated by a big heart."

=== Character development ===
Biographer Joanna Rapf observes that Lumet had always been an independent director, and liked to make films about "men who summon courage to challenge the system, about the little guy against the system". This includes the women characters, as in Garbo Talks (1984). Its star Anne Bancroft embodied the kind of character portrayal that attracted him: "a committed activist for all kinds of causes, who stands up for the rights of the oppressed, who is lively, outspoken, courageous, who refuses to conform for the sake of convenience, and whose understanding of life allows her to die with dignity ... Garbo Talks in many ways is a valentine to New York".

In an interview in 2006, Lumet said that he had always been "fascinated by the human cost involved in following passions and commitments, and the cost those passions and commitments inflict on others". This theme is at the core of most of his movies, notes Rapf, such as his true-life films about corruption in the New York City Police Department or in family dramas such as Daniel (1983).

=== Psychodramas ===
Film historian Stephen Bowles believes that Lumet was most comfortable and effective as a director of serious psychodramas, as opposed to light entertainments. His Academy Award nominations, for example, were all for character studies of men in crisis, from his first film, Twelve Angry Men, to The Verdict. Lumet excelled at putting drama on the screen. Most of his characters are driven by obsessions or passions, such as the pursuit of justice, honesty and truth, or jealousy, memory or guilt. Lumet was intrigued by obsessive conditions, writes Bowles.

Lumet's protagonists tended to be antiheroes, isolated and unexceptional men who rebel against a group or institution. The most important criterion for Lumet was not simply whether the actions of the people are right or wrong, but whether they were genuine and justified by the individual's conscience. Whistleblower Frank Serpico, for example, is the quintessential Lumet hero, who he described as a "rebel with a cause".

An earlier example of psychodrama was The Pawnbroker (1964), starring Rod Steiger. In it, Steiger plays a Holocaust survivor whose spirit has been broken and who lives day-to-day as a pawn shop manager in Harlem. Lumet used the film to examine, with flashbacks, the psychological and spiritual scars with which Steiger's character lives, including his lost capacity to feel pleasure. Steiger, who made nearly 80 films, said during a TV interview that the film was his favorite as an actor.

=== Issues of social justice ===
It was the social realism which permeated his greatest work that truly defined Lumet – the themes of youthful idealism beaten down by corruption and the hopelessness of inept social institutions allowed him to produce several trenchant and potent films that no other director could have made.

— Turner Classic Movies

Serpico (1973) was the first of four "seminal" films that Lumet made during the 1970s that marked him as "one of the greatest filmmakers of his generation". It was the story of power and betrayal in the New York City police force, with an idealistic policeman battling impossible odds.

Lumet was a child during the Depression, and grew up poor in New York City, witnessing poverty and corruption. It instilled in him at an early age a belief in the importance of justice for a democracy, a subject that he tried to put in his films. He admitted, however, that he did not believe that the movie business itself has the power to change anything. Rapf writes, "There is, as he says, a lot of 'shit' to deal with in the entertainment industry, but the secret of good work is to maintain your honesty and your passion." Film historian David Thomson writes of his films:

He has steady themes: the fragility of justice, and the police and their corruption. Lumet quickly became esteemed ... [and he] got a habit for big issues – Fail Safe, The Pawnbroker, The Hill, – and seemed torn between dullness and pathos. ... He was that rarity of the 1970s, a director happy to serve his material – yet seemingly not touched or changed by it. ... His sensitivity to actors and to the rhythms of the city have made him America's longest-lived descendant of the 1950s Neorealist tradition and its urgent commitment to ethical responsibility.

=== New York City settings ===
Lumet preferred to work in New York City and shunned the dominance of Hollywood. Despite praising the abundance of large sound stages within Hollywood that New York City lacked, he called the studio system overbearing due to its many department heads presiding throughout all stages of production, especially in the 1950s. As a director, he became strongly identified with New York City. "I always like being in Woody Allen's world," he said. He claimed that New York City's ethnic diversity and its stark urban contrasts, encompassing art and crime, sophistication and corruption, and beauty and ugliness, were his primary sources of inspiration. He felt that in order to create, it is important to confront reality on a daily basis; in 1960, he stated that "New York is filled with reality; Hollywood is a fantasyland." Lumet also found that the Screen Actors Guild union had less stringent rules in New York City, allowing extras to have speaking roles without having to paying them higher rates.

He often used New York City as the backdrop—if not the symbol—of his "preoccupation with America's decline", according to film historians Scott and Barbara Siegel. Lumet was attracted to crime-related stories in New York City urban settings, where the criminals get caught in a vortex of events that they can neither understand nor control but are forced to resolve.

=== Use of Jewish themes ===
Like other Jewish directors from New York, such as Woody Allen, Mel Brooks and Paul Mazursky, Lumet's characters often speak overtly about controversial issues of the times. They felt unconstrained as filmmakers, and their art became "filtered through their Jewish consciousness", wrote film historian David Desser. Lumet, like the others, sometimes turned to Jewish themes to develop ethnic sensibilities that were characteristic of American culture, by dynamically highlighting its "unique tensions and cultural diversity". This was partly reflected in Lumet's preoccupation with city life. A Stranger Among Us (1992), for example, is the story of a woman undercover police officer and her experiences in a Hasidic community in New York City.

The subject of "guilt", explains Desser, dominates many of Lumet's films. From his first feature film, 12 Angry Men (1957), in which a jury must decide the guilt or innocence of a young man, to Q&A (1990), in which a lawyer must determine the question of guilt and responsibility of a maverick policeman, guilt is a common thread that runs through many of his films. In Murder on the Orient Express (1974), all of the suspects are guilty.

His films are also characterized by a strong emphasis on family life, often showing tensions within the family. This emphasis on the family included "surrogate families", as in the police trilogy consisting of Serpico (1973), Prince of the City (1981), and Q&A. An "untraditional family" is also portrayed in Dog Day Afternoon (1975).

=== Directing techniques ===
Sidney was a visionary film-maker whose movies made an indelible mark on our popular culture with their stirring commentary on our society. Future generations of film-makers will look to Sidney's work for guidance and inspiration but there will never be another who comes close to him.

— composer Quincy Jones

Lumet preferred naturalism or realism, according to Joanna Rapf. He did not like the "decorator's look", for which the camera could call attention to itself. He edited his films so that the camera was unobtrusive. His cinematographer Ron Fortunato said, "Sidney flips if he sees a look that's too artsy." Lumet disliked CinemaScope and never filmed in an aspect ratio wider than 1.85:1.

Partly because he was willing and able to take on so many significant social issues and problems, he achieved strong performances from lead actors with fine work from character actors. He is "one of the stalwart figures of New York moviemaking. He abides by good scripts, when he gets them," said critic David Thomson. Although critics gave varying opinions of his films, Lumet's body of work is generally held in high esteem. Most critics have described him as a sensitive and intelligent director, having good taste, the courage to experiment with his style, and with a "gift for handling actors".

In a quote from his book, Lumet emphasized the logistics of directing:

Someone once asked me what making a movie was like. I said it was like making a mosaic. Each setup is like a tiny tile (a setup, the basic component of a film's production, consists of one camera position and its associated lighting). You color it, shape it, polish it as best you can. You'll do six or seven hundred of these, maybe a thousand. (There can easily be that many setups in a movie.) Then you literally paste them together and hope it's what you set out to do.

Critic Justin Chang adds that Lumet's skill as a director and in developing strong stories continued up to his last film in 2007, writing of his "nimble touch with performers, his ability to draw out great warmth and zesty humor with one hand and coax them toward ever darker, more anguished extremes of emotion with the other, was on gratifying display in his ironically titled final film, Before the Devil Knows You're Dead".

=== Vision of future films ===
In an interview with New York magazine, Lumet said that he expects to see more directors from different ethnic backgrounds and communities telling their stories. "You know, I started out making films about Jews and Italians and Irish because I didn't know anything else."

== Works ==
Directed features
Year	Film	Distributor
1957	12 Angry Men	United Artists
1958	Stage Struck	RKO Pictures
1959	That Kind of Woman	Paramount Pictures
1960	The Fugitive Kind	United Artists
1962	A View from the Bridge	Continental Film
1962	Long Day's Journey into Night	Embassy Pictures
1964	The Pawnbroker	Paramount Pictures
1964	Fail Safe	Columbia Pictures
1965	The Hill	Metro-Goldwyn-Mayer
1966	The Group	United Artists
1967	The Deadly Affair	Columbia Pictures
1968	Bye Bye Braverman	Warner Bros.
1968	The Sea Gull	Warner Bros.
1969	The Appointment	Metro-Goldwyn-Mayer
1970	Last of the Mobile Hot Shots	Warner Bros.
1971	The Anderson Tapes	Columbia Pictures
1972	Child's Play	Paramount Pictures
1973	The Offence	United Artists
1973	Serpico	Paramount Pictures
1974	Lovin' Molly	Columbia Pictures
1974	Murder on the Orient Express	Paramount Pictures
1975	Dog Day Afternoon	Warner Bros.
1976	Network	Metro-Goldwyn-Mayer / United Artists
1977	Equus	United Artists
1978	The Wiz	Universal Pictures
1980	Just Tell Me What You Want	Warner Bros.
1981	Prince of the City	Warner Bros. / Orion Pictures
1982	Deathtrap	Warner Bros.
1982	The Verdict	20th Century Fox
1983	Daniel	Paramount Pictures
1984	Garbo Talks	Metro-Goldwyn-Mayer
1986	Power	20th Century Fox
1986	The Morning After	20th Century Fox
1988	Running on Empty	Warner Bros.
1989	Family Business	Tri-Star Pictures
1990	Q&A	Tri-Star Pictures
1992	A Stranger Among Us	Buena Vista Pictures
1993	Guilty as Sin	Buena Vista Pictures
1996	Night Falls on Manhattan	Paramount Pictures
1997	Critical Care	LIVE Entertainment
1999	Gloria	Columbia Pictures
2006	Find Me Guilty	Freestyle Releasing
2007	Before the Devil Knows You're Dead	ThinkFilm

Bibliography

- Boyar, Jay (1993). Sidney Lumet. New York: Twayne Publishers. ISBN 978-0-805-79329-1.
- Cunningham, Frank R. (2001) [1991]. Sidney Lumet: Film and Literary Vision. University Press of Kentucky. ISBN 0-8131-1745-3.
- Spiegel, Maura (2019). Sidney Lumet: A Life. St. Martin's Press. ISBN 978-1-250-03015-3.

== Personal life and death ==
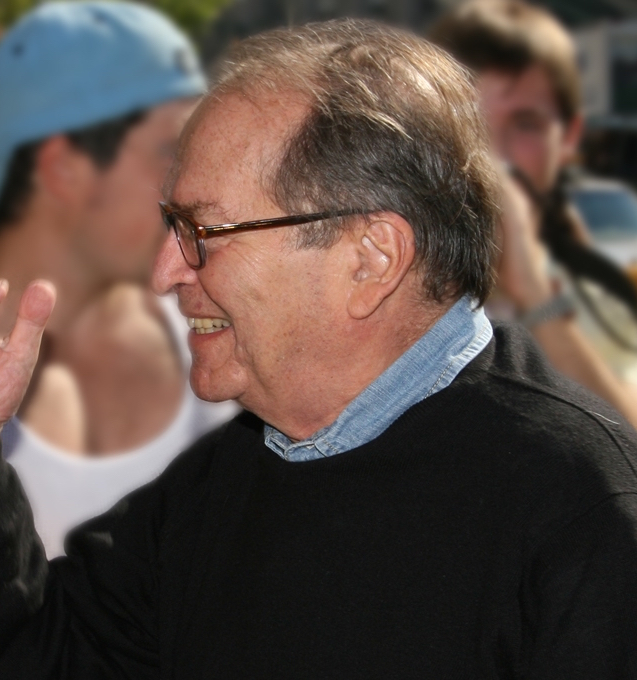
Lumet at the 2007 Toronto International Film Festival

Lumet was married four times; the first three marriages ended in divorce. He was married to actress Rita Gam from 1949 to 1955; to artist and heiress Gloria Vanderbilt from 1956 to 1963; to Gail Jones (daughter of Lena Horne) from 1963 to 1978; and to Mary Bailey Gimbel from 1980 until his death. He had two daughters by Jones: Amy, who was married to P.J. O'Rourke from 1990 to 1993, and actress and screenwriter Jenny, who had a leading role in his film Q&A. She also wrote the screenplay for the film Rachel Getting Married (2008), as well as co-creating two television series with Alex Kurtzman: The Silence of the Lambs sequel Clarice and Star Trek: Strange New Worlds.

Lumet died from lymphoma at age 86 on April 9, 2011, in his residence in Manhattan. When asked in a 1997 interview about how he wanted to "go out", Lumet responded, "I don't think about it. I'm not religious. I do know that I don't want to take up any space. Burn me up and scatter my ashes over Katz's Delicatessen." A few months after Lumet's death, a retrospective celebration of his work was held at New York's Lincoln Center with numerous speakers and film stars. In 2015, Nancy Buirski directed By Sidney Lumet, a documentary about his career that aired in January 2017 as part of PBS's American Masters series.

== Reputation and legacy ==
According to film historian Stephen Bowles, Lumet succeeded in becoming a leading drama filmmaker partly because "his most important criterion [when directing] is not whether the actions of his protagonists are right or wrong, but whether their actions are genuine". And where those actions are "justified by the individual's conscience, this gives his heroes uncommon strength and courage to endure the pressures, abuses, and injustices of others". His films have thereby continually given us the "quintessential hero acting in defiance of peer group authority and asserting his own code of moral values".

According to The Encyclopedia of Hollywood, Lumet was one of the most prolific filmmakers of the modern era, directing, on average, more than one movie a year since his directorial debut in 1957. Turner Classic Movies notes his "strong direction of actors", "vigorous storytelling" and the "social realism" in his best work. Chicago Sun-Times film critic Roger Ebert described him as "one of the finest craftsmen and warmest humanitarians among all film directors". Lumet was also known as an "actor's director", having worked with the best of them during his career, probably more than "any other director". Sean Connery, who acted in five of his films, considered him one of his favorite directors, and one who had that "vision thing".

Lumet's published memoir about his life in film, Making Movies (1996), is "extremely lighthearted and infectious in its enthusiasm for the craft of moviemaking itself", writes Bowles, "and is in marked contrast to the tone and style of most of his films. Perhaps Lumet's signature as a director is his work with actors – and his exceptional ability to draw high-quality, sometimes extraordinary performances from even the most unexpected quarters." Jake Coyle, a writer for the Associated Press, agreed: "While Lumet has for years gone relatively underappreciated, actors have consistently turned in some of their most memorable performances under his stewardship. From Katharine Hepburn to Faye Dunaway, Henry Fonda to Paul Newman, Lumet is known as an actor's director," and to some, like Ali MacGraw, he was considered "every actor's dream".

Lumet is one of the most important film directors in the history of American cinema, and his work has left an indelible mark on both audiences and the history of film itself.

— Frank Pierson
former President of Academy of Motion Pictures

In the belief that Lumet's "compelling stories and unforgettable performances were his strong suit", director and producer Steven Spielberg described Lumet as "one of the greatest directors in the long history of film". Al Pacino, on hearing of Lumet's death, stated that with his films, "He leaves a great legacy, but more than that, to the people close to him, he will remain the most civilized of humans and the kindest man I have ever known." Boston Herald writer James Verniere observed that "at a time when the American film industry is intent on seeing how low it can go, Sidney Lumet remains a master of the morally complex American drama". Following his death, fellow New York directors Woody Allen and Martin Scorsese both paid tribute to Lumet. Allen called him the "quintessential New York film-maker", while Scorsese said that "our vision of the city has been enhanced and deepened by classics like Serpico, Dog Day Afternoon and, above all, the remarkable Prince of the City". Lumet also drew praise from New York mayor Michael Bloomberg, who called him "one of the great chroniclers of our city".

He did not win an individual Academy Award, although he did receive an Academy Honorary Award in 2005, and 14 of his films were nominated for various Oscars, such as Network, which was nominated for 10, winning 4. In 2005, Lumet received an Academy Award for Lifetime Achievement for his "brilliant services to screenwriters, performers, and the art of the motion picture".

A few months after Lumet's death in April 2011, TV commentator Lawrence O'Donnell aired a tribute to Lumet, and a retrospective celebration of his work was held at New York's Lincoln Center, with the appearance of numerous speakers and film stars. In October 2011, the organization Human Rights First inaugurated its "Sidney Lumet Award for Integrity in Entertainment" for the TV show The Good Wife, along with giving awards to two Middle East activists who had worked for freedom and democracy. Lumet had worked with Human Rights First on a media project related to the depiction of torture and interrogation on television.

== Awards and honors ==
Lumet has been recognized by the Academy of Motion Picture Arts and Sciences for the following films:

- 30th Academy Awards (1957): Best Director, nomination, 12 Angry Men
- 48th Academy Awards (1975): Best Director, nomination, Dog Day Afternoon
- 49th Academy Awards (1976): Best Director, nomination, Network
- 54th Academy Awards (1981): Best Adapted Screenplay, nomination, Prince of the City
- 55th Academy Awards (1982): Best Director, nomination, The Verdict
- 77th Academy Awards (2004): Honorary Academy Award, win

Lumet has also received the Berlin International Film Festival's Golden Bear for 12 Angry Men. He received four nominations for the Cannes Film Festival Palme d'Or for the films Long Day's Journey into Night (1962), The Hill (1965), The Appointment (1969) and A Stranger Among Us (1992). He also received a Venice Film Festival Golden Lion award nomination for Prince of the City (1981).

Awards and nominations received by Lumet's films
Year	Title	Academy Awards		BAFTA Awards		Golden Globe Awards	
Year	Title	Nominations	Wins	Nominations	Wins	Nominations	Wins
1957	12 Angry Men	3		2	1	4	
1962	Long Day's Journey into Night	1				1	
1964	The Pawnbroker	1		2	1	1	
1964	Fail Safe			1			
1965	The Hill			6	1		
1966	The Group			1		1	
1967	The Deadly Affair			5			
1970	King: A Filmed Record... Montgomery to Memphis	1					
1973	The Offence			1			
1973	Serpico	2		3		2	1
1974	Murder on the Orient Express	6	1	10	3		
1975	Dog Day Afternoon	6	1	6	2	7	
1976	Network	10	4	9	1	5	4
1977	Equus	3		5	1	2	2
1978	The Wiz	4				2	
1981	Prince of the City	1				3	
1982	The Verdict	5				5	
1984	Garbo Talks					1	
1986	The Morning After	1				3	
1988	Running on Empty	2				5	1
1990	Q&A					1	
Total		46	6	56	11	43	10

Directed Academy Award performances by actors

Year	Performer	Film	Result
Academy Award for Best Actor
1965	Rod Steiger	The Pawnbroker	Nominated
1974	Al Pacino	Serpico	Nominated
1975	Albert Finney	Murder on the Orient Express	Nominated
1976	Al Pacino	Dog Day Afternoon	Nominated
1977	Peter Finch	Network	Won†
1977	William Holden	Network	Nominated
1978	Richard Burton	Equus	Nominated
1983	Paul Newman	The Verdict	Nominated
Academy Award for Best Actress
1963	Katharine Hepburn	Long Day's Journey into Night	Nominated
1977	Faye Dunaway	Network	Won
1987	Jane Fonda	The Morning After	Nominated
Academy Award for Best Supporting Actor
1976	Chris Sarandon	Dog Day Afternoon	Nominated
1977	Ned Beatty	Network	Nominated
1978	Peter Firth	Equus	Nominated
1983	James Mason	The Verdict	Nominated
1989	River Phoenix	Running on Empty	Nominated
Academy Award for Best Supporting Actress
1975	Ingrid Bergman	Murder on the Orient Express	Won
1977	Beatrice Straight	Network	Won

== See also ==
- List of Jewish Academy Award winners and nominees
- List of Golden Globe winners
