= Journey to Jerusalem (play) =

1940 play by Maxwell Anderson

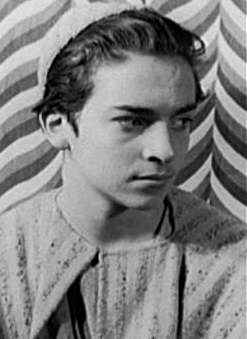
Photo of Sidney Lumet as actor in play, "Journey to Jerusalem (1940)

Journey to Jerusalem is a 1940 play by Maxwell Anderson about a trip made to Jerusalem by the Holy Family when Jesus was twelve years old. In the play, Anderson parallels ancient Biblical events with the rise of Adolf Hitler, embodied in the play by Herod Antipas. Jesus slowly realizes from a fictitious New Testament prophet what his destiny as the Messiah will be. The play featured Arlene Francis as the Virgin Mary (here called Miriam) and future screen director Sidney Lumet in an early acting appearance at age 15 as Jesus (here called Jeshua). Karl Malden also had an early role in the play, as a Centurion.

Although the play was acclaimed, it had an extremely brief run and was not a box-office success. It was, however, filmed by a NY based company THEATRE ON FILM Inc and released as a 90-minute 16mmm film in 1941. This is probably the source of the film excerpts from the stage performance - labeled "a screen reproduction of the play" on a website.
