= Jenny Lumet =

American actress and screenwriter (born 1967)

- Born: February 2, 1967 (age 59); New York City, U.S.
- Occupations: Actress, screenwriter
- Years active: 1982–present
- Known for: Rachel Getting Married (writer); Star Trek: Strange New Worlds (creator, executive producer); Star Trek: Discovery (written by, executive producer); Star Trek: Picard (consulting producer); Star Trek: Short Treks (written by)
- Spouses: Bobby Cannavale (m. 1994; div. 2003) Alexander Weinstein (m. 2008)
- Children: 2, including Jake Cannavale
- Parents: Sidney Lumet (father); Gail Jones (mother)
- Relatives: Lena Horne (maternal grandmother); Baruch Lumet (paternal grandfather)

Jenny Lumet (born February 2, 1967) is an American actress and screenwriter. She is the daughter of director Sidney Lumet and granddaughter of Lena Horne. Lumet wrote the original screenplay of the 2008 Jonathan Demme film Rachel Getting Married and has worked on several Star Trek series.

== Early life and education ==
Lumet was born on February 2, 1967, in New York City. She is the second daughter born to director Sidney Lumet and journalist/writer Gail Buckley (Gail Buckley Jones). On her paternal side, she is of Polish-Jewish ancestry. Her paternal grandfather was Baruch Lumet, who was a Yiddish theatre actor. On her maternal side, she is of African-American, European and Senegalese descent. Her maternal grandmother was singer Lena Horne. In 1984, Lumet graduated from Dalton School.

== Career ==
Lumet began working in the entertainment industry as an actress. She appeared in small roles in two films directed by her father, Deathtrap and Running on Empty, before playing the role of Nancy Bosch in his 1990 film Q&A. Lumet wrote the screenplay for the 2008 Jonathan Demme film, Rachel Getting Married. In 2016, Lumet had a CBS drama with a pilot commitment. Lumet was a script doctor for the 2017 version of The Mummy, and was a drama teacher at the Manhattan Country School in New York City. In 2018, Lumet joined the staff of Star Trek: Discovery as a consulting producer, and was subsequently promoted to co-executive producer. She co-wrote "Runaway", the first of the Short Treks mini-episodes. More recently, she signed an overall deal with CBS Studios.

== Personal life ==
Lumet was married to actor Bobby Cannavale from 1994 until their divorce in 2003. Their son is the actor Jake Cannavale. Lumet has a daughter with second husband Alexander Weinstein, whom she married in 2008.

On November 30, 2017, Lumet alleged music producer Russell Simmons sexually assaulted her in 1991. In response, Simmons said his recollection of the sexual incident differed from Lumet's and he was removing himself from leadership positions at his businesses.

== Awards ==
- 2008: Film Independent Spirit Awards, Best First Screenplay (nomination) for Rachel Getting Married
- 2008: New York Film Critics Circle Awards, Best Screenplay for Rachel Getting Married
- 2008: Toronto Film Critics Association Awards, Best Screenplay for Rachel Getting Married
- 2009: NAACP Image Awards, Outstanding Writing in a Motion Picture (Theatrical or Television) for Rachel Getting Married

== Filmography ==
- 1975: Everybody Rides the Carousel – Stage 4 (voice)
- 1982: Deathtrap – Stage Newsboy
- 1988: Running on Empty – Music Girl
- 1988: Tougher Than Leather – Pam
- 1990: Q&A – Nancy Bosch
- 1994: Assassination – Stephanie Merrin (Short)
- 1995: DodgeBall – Claudette Mitty
- 2008: Rachel Getting Married – Writer
- 2017: The Mummy – Writer (screen story)
- 2017: Star Trek: Discovery – Co-executive producer, writer
- 2020: Star Trek: Picard – Consulting producer
- 2021: Clarice – Co-creator, executive producer, writer
- 2022: The Man Who Fell to Earth – Co-creator, executive producer, writer
- 2022: Star Trek: Strange New Worlds – Co-creator, executive producer, writer
