= Buonasera Raffaella =

Buonasera Raffaella is a television program hosted by Raffaella Carrà, broadcast on Rai 1 on Thursdays at 8.30 pm for a single season of fifteen episodes, which were aired from 5 December 1985 to 8 March 1986. The last five episodes of the series were broadcast from the Rai Corporation studios in New York.
