= The Morning After (1986 film) =

1986 film by Sidney Lumet

- Theatrical release poster
- Directed by: Sidney Lumet
- Written by: James Hicks; David Rayfiel (uncredited)
- Produced by: Bruce Gilbert
- Starring: Jane Fonda; Jeff Bridges; Raul Julia
- Cinematography: Andrzej Bartkowiak
- Edited by: Joel Goodman
- Music by: Paul Chihara
- Production companies: American Filmworks; Lorimar Motion Pictures
- Distributed by: 20th Century Fox
- Release date: December 25, 1986
- Running time: 103 minutes
- Country: United States
- Language: English
- Budget: $15 million
- Box office: $25.1 million (US and Canada)

The Morning After is a 1986 American psychological thriller film directed by Sidney Lumet and starring Jane Fonda, Jeff Bridges, and Raul Julia. It follows a washed-up, alcoholic actress who awakens on Thanksgiving morning beside the dead body of a photographer in his loft, with no memory of the events from the night before. She attempts to uncover the truth of what occurred with the help of a former police officer she encounters while on the run.

Released by 20th Century Fox on Christmas Day 1986, the film received generally favorable reviews. Fonda received a nomination for the Academy Award for Best Actress for her performance in the film.

== Plot ==
Alexandra "Alex" Sternbergen, a washed-up, alcoholic actress who performs under the stage name "Viveca Van Loren", wakes up on Thanksgiving 1986 next to the bloodied corpse of a sleazy photographer named Bobby Korshack in his Los Angeles loft. Suffering a hangover, Alex does not recall any events from the night before. She phones her husband Joaquin "Jacky" Manero, a salon owner from whom she is separated, and he insists that Alex call the police. Instead, she attempts to flee the city but is unable to get a flight amidst the crush of holiday travelers. In a parking garage, she manages to hitch a ride back downtown from Turner Kendall, a former police officer who was discharged.

Alex returns to Bobby's apartment to clean the evidence and obtain the murder weapon. While leaving, she is met by Turner, returning the pocketbook she left in his car; he claims to have tracked her to the area using a matchbook with Bobby's studio address on it. Alex reluctantly agrees to invite Turner into her apartment, where the two have a makeshift Thanksgiving dinner. The evening ends with Alex drunkenly stumbling into bed, after which Turner leaves.

In the morning, Alex awakens to find Bobby's dead body in her shower, causing her to flee her apartment. She is met by Turner, who is returning to check on her. Suffering withdrawals, Turner brings Alex to a convenience store to purchase beer, and she confesses to him the events that occurred the day before. Believing Alex killed Bobby, Turner urges her to contact the authorities, but she fears she will not be believed based on a domestic assault conviction in which she stabbed her ex-husband with a paring knife while intoxicated.

Alex visits her friend Frankie, a drag queen, to obtain clothing to disguise herself. Turner subsequently confronts Alex, informing her that he searched her apartment but found no sign of Bobby's body, and believes that she may have been framed. Meanwhile, police investigating Bobby's murder visit Jacky's salon to question him about Alex's whereabouts. Alex spends the night at Turner's home, and the two have sex. In the morning, Alex is dismayed to find newspaper articles detailing her disappearance and suspicion in Bobby's murder. She visits her lawyer, Mr. Hurley, who is overseeing her divorce case from Jacky. Meanwhile, Turner interviews Bobby's neighbor, who tells him she witnessed Alex raving in a drunken state the night of Bobby's murder. Alex arrives at Jacky's salon, and he agrees to style her hair in attempt to further conceal her identity.

Alex stays at Jacky's salon while he attends a dinner with his new lover, socialite Isabel Harding, and is startled when Turner appears there. Jacky returns with Isabel and renders Turner unconscious by bludgeoning him with a vase. It is revealed that Isabel murdered Bobby, who had been blackmailing her with lascivious photographs, and Jacky framed Alex for the crime to protect her. Jacky attempts to drown Alex in a bathtub to silence her, while a remorseful Isabel looks on. However, Turner comes to and he shoots and wounds Jacky before losing consciousness again, thereby saving Alex. Police arrive and Isabel turns on Jacky, telling police he is the one who murdered Bobby. Later, Alex visits Turner while he recovers in the hospital, and tells him she has not had a drink in two days. Turner reveals to Alex that he too is a recovering alcoholic. When Turner asks Alex to leave, she initially complies, before returning to his bedside and declaring that he makes her happy.

== Cast ==
- Jane Fonda as Alexandra "Alex" Sternbergen / Viveca Van Loren
- Jeff Bridges as Turner Kendall
- Raul Julia as Joaquin "Jacky" Manero, Alex's husband
- Diane Salinger as Isabel Harding, Jacky's new lover
- Richard Foronjy as Sergeant Herb Greenbaum
- Geoffrey Scott as Bobby Korshack
- James "Gypsy" Haake as Frankie, a drag queen and friend of Alex's
- Kathleen Wilhoite as "Red", Jackie's assistant at his salon
- Don Hood as Mr. Hurley, the lawyer
- Bruce Vilanch as Harry, the bartender
- Frances Bergen as Mrs. Harding, Isabel's mother
- Rick Rossovich as Detective
- Kathy Bates as Korshack's neighbor
- Corinna Everson as Miss Olympia

== Reception ==
=== Critical response ===
On the review aggregator website Rotten Tomatoes, the film holds an approval rating of 63% based on 19 reviews, with an average rating of 5.7/10. Linda Rasmussen of AllMovie described it as an "excellent thriller, crisply directed by Sidney Lumet" that "creates a good deal of suspense", and singled out Fonda for praise: "The highlight of the film is the performance by Jane Fonda reminiscent of her magnificent performance as Bree Daniels in Klute."

Critic Roger Ebert remarked the film's strong opening sequence, but added: "Unfortunately, The Morning After never lives up to its early promise – not as a thriller, anyway. The plot has some yawning gaps in it, and thriller plots should be watertight. But [it] is worth seeing anyway, because of the characters that it develops, and the performances of Fonda and Jeff Bridges in the two leads." Vincent Canby of The New York Times praised the film's dark humor, writing that it "becomes the kind of enjoyable, sophisticated comedy-mystery that requires much more talent to pull off successfully than is usually acknowledged. It may be instantly disposable, but heaven save us from a season of commercial movies that, like sensible shoes, are designed to last forever."

=== Accolades ===
Fonda was nominated for the Academy Award for Best Actress.

== Home media ==
Warner Bros. Home Entertainment released the film on DVD in 2005, followed by a Warner Archive Collection made-on-demand DVD-R release on June 28, 2016.

The film was released on Blu-ray for the first time by Shout! Factory on May 30, 2023. The release features a new 2K restoration of the film from an interpositive, along with two brand new featurettes.
