= Garbo Talks =

1984 American comedy-drama film directed by Sidney Lumet

- Theatrical release poster
- Directed by: Sidney Lumet
- Written by: Larry Grusin
- Produced by: Burtt Harris; Elliott Kastner
- Starring: Anne Bancroft; Ron Silver; Carrie Fisher; Catherine Hicks; Steven Hill; Howard Da Silva; Dorothy Loudon; Harvey Fierstein; Hermione Gingold
- Cinematography: Andrzej Bartkowiak
- Edited by: Andrew Mondshein
- Music by: Cy Coleman
- Production company: United Artists
- Distributed by: MGM/UA Entertainment Company
- Release date: October 12, 1984
- Running time: 103 minutes
- Country: United States
- Language: English
- Box office: $1.4 million

Garbo Talks is a 1984 American comedy-drama film directed by Sidney Lumet and starring Anne Bancroft, Ron Silver, and Carrie Fisher, with an uncredited appearance by Betty Comden as Greta Garbo.

The film was written by Larry Grusin, and also stars Catherine Hicks, Steven Hill, and the first screen appearance of Mary McDonnell. It also featured the final screen appearances of veteran actors Howard Da Silva and Hermione Gingold. Bancroft was nominated for a Golden Globe.

The title is a reference to the first film in which Greta Garbo's speaking voice is heard. Her husky voice and purposefully exaggerated Swedish accent debuted in Eugene O'Neill's Anna Christie (1930), which was publicized with the slogan "Garbo Talks".

The film received mixed reviews from critics and was a box office disappointment.

== Plot ==
Estelle Rolfe (Anne Bancroft) is a middle-aged, divorced and outspoken social activist whose behavior causes her devoted grown son Gilbert (Ron Silver) some consternation.

After being diagnosed with a terminal brain tumor, Estelle's last wish is to meet the movie star she has admired and idolized all of her life, the reclusive Greta Garbo.

Initially, Gilbert's wife Lisa (Carrie Fisher) sympathizes with his mission to fulfill his mother's wish to meet Garbo. However, after Gilbert begins missing work to devote more time to search for the elusive actress and spends their entire savings in the process, Lisa has had enough and she leaves him. Gilbert's co-worker Jane Mortimer (Catherine Hicks), a winsome, aspiring actress takes a liking to Gilbert and a romance gradually develops, but first comes Gilbert's increasingly frantic search for a famous woman who does not care to be found.

A lead takes Gilbert to aging paparazzo Angelo Dokakis (Howard Da Silva), who had previously photographed the elusive Garbo and is acquainted with her habits and possible whereabouts; but after several days of staking out her apartment building they are unable to find her. After several other unsuccessful attempts, another lead takes Gilbert to an elderly actress named Elizabeth Rennick (Hermione Gingold) who once knew Garbo. She advises Gilbert to look for her at a local flea market.

With very little time to spare, Gilbert finally comes face-to-face with Garbo at the flea market and he tells her of his mother's condition. Without a word, Garbo goes directly to the hospital and sits at Estelle's bedside.

Gilbert is content that Estelle's wish to meet Garbo had been fulfilled, and Estelle passes away soon after. The following day, Gilbert quits his job, but not before telling off his boss. As he and Jane are strolling in the park, she is suddenly startled by the sight of Garbo approaching them. Jane is amazed when Garbo pauses to say hello to Gilbert.

== Cast ==
- Anne Bancroft as Estelle Rolfe
- Ron Silver as Gilbert Rolfe
- Carrie Fisher as Lisa Rolfe
- Betty Comden as Greta Garbo (uncredited)
- Catherine Hicks as Jane Mortimer
- Steven Hill as Walter Rolfe
- Howard Da Silva as Angelo Dokakis
- Dorothy Loudon as Sonya Apollinar
- Harvey Fierstein as Bernie Whitlock
- Hermione Gingold as Elizabeth Rennick
- Richard B. Shull as Shepard Plotkin
- Adolph Green as himself
- Michael Lombard as Mr. Morganelli
- Ed Crowley as Mr. Goldhammer
- Alice Spivak as Claire Rolfe
- Mary McDonnell as Lady Capulet
- Arthur Schlesinger, Jr. as himself (uncredited)
- Cy Coleman as himself (uncredited)
- George Plimpton as himself (uncredited)

== Reception ==
Vincent Canby of the New York Times in his October 12, 1984 review wrote of the film having "a number of comic scenes and lines that are played with great verve by Miss Bancroft and Mr. Silver."

Roger Ebert of the Chicago Sun-Times on the same day panned the film, awarding it one star of a possible four. Ebert wrote: "Garbo Talks starts out as a great idea for a movie, and when it's over, it's still a great idea for a movie, but the problem is, there are no great ideas in between."

Garbo Talks holds a 57% rating on Rotten Tomatoes based on 21 reviews. The site's consensus states: "Garbo Talks finds Lumet shifting into comedic gear while commanding a cast that's often talented enough to distract from the story's flaws."
