= Dead End (play) =

Stage play by Sidney Kingsley

Dead End is a stage play written by playwright Sidney Kingsley. It premiered on Broadway in October 1935 and ran for two years. It is notable for being the first project to feature the Dead End Kids, who would go on to star, under various names, in 89 films and three serials. These names include Dead End Kids, Little Tough Guys, the East Side Kids and the Bowery Boys. The original play and the 1937 film adaptation were grim dramas set in a poverty-stricken riverside neighborhood in New York City, where the boys (known as the 63rd Street Gang) look on reform school as a learning opportunity. They played similar characters in several films; their later pictures are comedies.

== Plot ==
Dead End concerns a group of adolescent children growing up on the streets of New York City during the Great Depression. Bonnie Stephanoff, author of a book on homelessness during the Depression, wrote that it "graphically depicted the lives and longings of a group of boys who swam in a polluted river, cooked food over outdoor fires, smoked cigarettes, gambled, swore, fought, carried weapons and became entangled in [crime] on Manhattan's Lower East Side."

The long opening stage directions for Act One vividly evoke the grim setting, and the action carries on. “A gang of boys are swimming in the sewerage at the foot of the wharf, splashing about and enjoying it immensely. Some of them wear torn bathing trunks, others are nude. Their speech is a rhythmic, shocking jargon that would put a truck-driver to blush.” The boys' horseplay includes tossing feces and offal at each other.

Gimpty is a would-be architect who struggles with unemployment. As his nickname suggests, one leg is deformed, because he suffered from rickets as a child. A gang member in his youth, he managed to turn his life around, finish high school and go on to college. He dreams of rebuilding the neighborhood with clean housing units, but poverty and hardships have forced him to search for work wherever possible. He yearns for Kay, a young woman who lives in the elegant apartment house on the other side of the street. Drina is a working-class girl who has been struggling to keep her younger brother Tommy off the streets ever since their parents died. Meanwhile, local gangster Baby-Face Martin returns to his old neighborhood to visit his mother and to find his old love, Francey. At the end of the play, Martin is dead and Tommy is headed to reform school, his future uncertain.

Variety's review of the film pinpointed some key elements in the play that fell prey to the censors. The girl Gimpty yearns for is being kept in her elegant apartment by a rich man. Martin's former girlfriend, Francey, now a prostitute, is riddled with disease. The play is full of profane language, including ethnic slurs that were common at the time.

== Production ==
Kingsley first conceived the idea of Dead End in 1934, on a walk that took him past the river. On November 10, 1935, The New York Times published a piece headlined “It Often Pays to Take a Walk Along the East River: In Which Mr. Kingsley Reveals a Few of the Events Leading Up to the Writing of Dead End”. It is impossible to excerpt this very revealing and moving article.

The play featured fourteen children who were hired to play various roles, including Gabriel Dell as T.B, Huntz Hall as Dippy, Billy Halop as Tommy, Bobby Jordan as Angel, Bernard Punsly as Milty, with David Gorcey and Leo Gorcey as the Second Avenue Boys. Charlie Duncan, the original actor for Spit, quit the production to take part in another play before Dead End's premiere. Consequently, Duncan was replaced in the role by his understudy Leo, who was originally recruited by his younger brother David to audition for the play. In time, Gorcey would soon become the group's de facto leader and the most recognizable of the young actors, eclipsing the rest of them in popularity.

Dead End premiered on October 2, 1935 at the Belasco Theatre and ran for 687 performances before closing on June 12, 1937. In addition to writing the play, Kingsley was director of the production. The cast included Joseph Downing as Baby Face Martin, Marjorie Main as Mrs. Martin, and Margaret Mullen as Kay.

The New York Times' Peter Flint recalled in Kingley's obituary: “To bring authenticity and immediacy to the Broadway production of "Dead End," Mr. Kingsley used the orchestra pit of the Belasco Theater as the East River. The staging made it seem as if the play's tough young street kids were diving into the river to cool off. There was no water in the pit, Mr. Kingsley emphasized in an interview in the Dramatists Guild Quarterly in the fall of 1984. "That would have been disastrous," he said. "The theater was drafty; the kids would inevitably have come down with pneumonia. They simply leaped into a net in the pit. Once they jumped, the assistant stage manager threw a geyser of water up in the air, representing the splash. He then rubbed them down with oil, and they came out glistening as if they were wet, but actually the oil protected them from the chill. We also fed them daily with vitamins."

When the text of the play was published in 1937, Lewis Nichols gave it rave review in The New York Times, observing “Random House has turned out a good tough truthful show that could fit as well under Literature—Social as under Literature—Drama.”

== Reception ==
The New York Times critic Brooks Atkinson: "By adding a little thought and art to considerable accurate observation. Sidney Kingsley has compiled an enormously stirring drama about life in New York City." He ended his list of praise with Geddes' stage design, adding "Dead End is worth the best our theatre affords. As thought it is a contribution to public knowledge. As drama it is vivid and bold."

While Dead End attracted many positive notices, not all reviews were favorable: The Washington Post called the play "a thinnish plea for slums reform".

Senator Robert F. Wagner Sr., Democrat of New York, said that the play had a major impact in speeding slum clearance.

Eleanor Roosevelt, wife of President Franklin D. Roosevelt, reportedly saw Dead End three times. Thanks to her, the president requested a command performance in the White House. Roosevelt soon appointed a slum study commission.

In her essay, “Realism, Censorship and the Social Promise of Dead End,” published in 2013, Amanda Ann Klein writes at length about the dramatic effects of both the play and the film at the time when they appeared.

== Later productions ==
Dead End has been revived three times. The first revival ran in 1978 at the Quaigh Theatre in New York City (Hotel Diplomat, 100 West 43d Street, demolished in 1993). Reviewing it for The New York Times, in May 1978, Mel Gussow observed: “In its day, Dead End may have had a certain viability as a social document, but decades of subsequent plays, novels and movies have made it look less like a pioneer than like an artifact.” He added “The Quaigh is a tiny theater and it is rather overwhelmed by the production.”

In 1997, director Nicholas Martin staged a full-scale production at the Williamstown Theatre Festival in Williamstown, Massachusetts. The cast featured Campbell Scott as Baby-Face Martin, Scott Wolf as Tommy, Robert Sean Leonard as Gimpty, Ebon Moss-Bachrach as T.B., Gregory Esposito as Angel, Christopher Fitzgerald as Spit, Sam Wright as Dippy, and Hope Davis as Drina. Set designer James Noone introduced the concept of a large water tank placed downstage, thus giving the impression of a wharf on the East Side. Reviewing the production for CurtainUp.com, Elyse Sommer wrote: “If directors were given report cards, Nicholas Martin (along with the WTF producer Michael Ritchie) would surely rate an A+ for recognizing this long dormant drama's relevancy and enduring power to cut through the period piece surface and reach to that core within the audience where emotion takes over; and also for having the courage to do it... Kingsley's sixty-year-old street-of-no-returns saga still works as entertaining, well-paced and emotionally engaging theater.” thanks to the contributions made by “Martin’s collaborators, the actors and designers.”

In 2005, Dead End was revived at the Ahmanson Theatre in Los Angeles. Directed by Michael Ritchie, the revival celebrated the 70th anniversary of the play's debut. One performance marked a reunion of sorts for the surviving relatives of the original Dead End Kids actors. Leo Gorcey, Jr., Gabe Dell, Jr., Bobby Jordan, Jr. were among those in attendance, as well as Billy Halop's nephew and nieces Zach, Jennifer and Melissa Halop.

In 2022, the play was adapted as a musical, produced as a concept album, "Dead End the Musical" The musical was written by Neil Fishman (Music), Harvey Edelman (Lyrics), and Peter C. Palame (Book), and published by Sammy Smile Music LLC.

== Film adaptation ==
Producer Samuel Goldwyn and director William Wyler saw the Broadway play 1936 during its original run and decided to adapt it into a motion picture. Goldwyn paid $165,000 for the film rights and began auditioning actors in Los Angeles. He was unable to find established actors that could accurately portray the youths in the play. Eventually, Goldwyn and Wyler recruited six of the original Kids (Halop, Jordan, Hall, Punsly, Dell, and Leo Gorcey) and signed them to two-year contracts with United Artists.

The 1937 film starred Humphrey Bogart as Baby Face. While it closely adheres to the play, the film changes the character of Gimpty to David, a healthy all-American heroic type who challenges Baby Face. In the film, he challenges Baby Face and kills him in a climatic gunfight. The play ends differently.

Preceded by None	Broadway play 1935–1937	Succeeded by Dead End Kids; 1937–1939
