= Equus (film) =

1977 British-American drama film directed by Sidney Lumet

- Theatrical release poster
- Directed by: Sidney Lumet
- Screenplay by: Peter Shaffer
- Based on: Equus by Peter Shaffer
- Produced by: Elliott Kastner; Lester Persky
- Starring: Richard Burton; Peter Firth; Jenny Agutter; Joan Plowright; Colin Blakely
- Cinematography: Oswald Morris
- Edited by: John Victor-Smith
- Music by: Richard Rodney Bennett
- Production company: Winkast Film Productions
- Distributed by: United Artists
- Release dates: 14 October 1977 (UK); 19 October 1977 (US)
- Running time: 137 minutes
- Countries: United Kingdom; United States
- Language: English
- Budget: $4 million

Equus is a 1977 psychological drama film directed by Sidney Lumet and written by Peter Shaffer, based on his 1973 play of the same name. The film stars Richard Burton, Peter Firth, Colin Blakely, Joan Plowright, Harry Andrews, Eileen Atkins, Kate Reid and Jenny Agutter. The story concerns a psychiatrist treating a teenager who has blinded horses in a stable, attempting to find the root of his horse worship.

Lumet's adaptation of the acclaimed play to film incorporated realism through the use of real horses rather than human actors and provided a graphic depiction of the blinding incident. Despite some criticism regarding this approach, the film was praised for the performances of its cast.

The film was nominated for three Academy Awards, including Best Actor for Burton and Best Supporting Actor for Firth. The two both won Golden Globe Awards for their performances. The film was also nominated for four BAFTA Awards, with Jenny Agutter winning for Best Supporting Actress.

== Plot ==
Hesther Salomon, a magistrate, asks her platonic friend Martin Dysart, a disillusioned psychiatrist who works with disturbed teenagers at a hospital in Hampshire, England, to treat a 17-year-old stable boy named Alan Strang after he blinded six horses with a sickle. With Alan only singing TV commercial jingles, Martin goes to see the boy's parents, the non-religious Frank Strang and his Christian fundamentalist wife Dora. She had taught her son the basics of sex and that God sees all, but the withdrawn Alan replaced his mother's deity with a god he called Equus, incarnated in horses. Frank discloses to Martin that he witnessed Alan late at night in his room, haltered and flagellating himself, as he chanted a series of names in Biblical genealogy-fashion which culminated in the name Equus as he climaxed.

Martin begins winning the respect and confidence of Alan, who shares his earliest memory of a horse from when he was six and a man approached him on a horse named Trojan. Alan imagined the horse spoke to him, and said his true name was Equus, and this was the name of all horses. The man took Alan up on Trojan, which the boy found thrilling, but his parents reacted negatively and injured him taking him off the horse. Martin also meets the stable manager, who reveals Alan secured his job through another employee, Jill. Devastated at the horses' injuries she indirectly caused, Jill has taken medical leave.

Eventually, Alan admits to Martin that he would secretly take horses away from the stables at night to ride them nude, chanting prayers to Equus until he reached orgasm, after which he caressed them lovingly. Martin envies the boy's passionate paganism, in comparison to his own empty life, where he has ceased intimacies with his wife and is plagued by nightmares of ritualistically slaughtering children in Homer's Greece, wearing the Mask of Agamemnon. Given an aspirin serving as a placebo "truth drug", Alan further reveals that one evening Jill tempted him to go to a pornographic film at a local cinema, where he was shocked to see his father, who forced him to leave the cinema. After Alan went back with Jill to the stables, she stripped and offered him sex but he was unable to perform and, although she was sympathetic, told her to leave. Naked, and tormented that Equus sees all and is a jealous god, he blinded the horses.

Martin is left troubled by the fact that he can treat Alan to take away his pain but in the process will deprive the boy of his passion, leaving him as emotionally neutered as Martin himself.

== Cast ==
- Richard Burton as Dr. Martin Dysart
- Peter Firth as Alan Strang
- Colin Blakely as Frank Strang
- Joan Plowright as Dora Strang
- Harry Andrews as Harry Dalton
- Eileen Atkins as Hesther Saloman
- Jenny Agutter as Jill Mason
- Kate Reid as Margaret Dysart
- John Wyman as Horseman
- Frazier Mohawk as the Ringmaster
- Elva Mai Hoover as Miss Raintree
- Ken James as Mr. Pearce
- David Gardner as Dr. Bennett
- James Hurdle as Mr. Davies
- Sheldon Rybowski as Child
- Brook Williams as Art

== Production ==
=== Development ===
Director Sidney Lumet saw the play Equus when it was first performed in London between 1973 and 1975, and also saw productions with Anthony Perkins and Richard Burton. Lumet found that Perkins' performance was excellent, but felt the stage productions failed to capture the conflict of the character Martin Dysart, which he believed was meant to represent writer Peter Shaffer's inner turmoil.

Shaffer and Lumet spent more than one year preparing the screenplay before filming began. Much of the dialogue in Shaffer's play is preserved, accurately, in the screenplay.

Marlon Brando and Jack Nicholson were considered for the part of Dysart in the film version. However, Burton's stage performance won over audiences, despite concerns about his alcoholism.

=== Filming ===
In stage productions, the horses are portrayed by human actors, often heavily built, athletic men wearing tribal-style masks. Lumet did not believe this could adequately be done in a film version, concluding a degree of realism was required, "because the reality he [Alan] was being watched in was going to create the dilemma within him". For horse-related stunts, the filmmakers consulted Yakima Canutt, who had previously worked on almost all of John Wayne's early western films. The horse riding and blinding scenes were shot initially in natural light before moving to unrealistic lighting, to capture conflicting Apollonian and Dionysian world views. With cinematographer Oswald Morris and production designer Tony Walton, Lumet developed a complex colour scheme avoiding easily identifiable colours, preferring to combine colours to emphasise duality.

The scene where Firth rides the horse nude was filmed in one take, in an uninterrupted shot lasting four and a half minutes. Whereas the blinding scene was done in pantomime on stage, Lumet opted to graphically display it to convey the horror. Much of the footage shot depicted the horses' heads morphing into faces of Jesus, Dora Strang and Frank Strang, and a glimpse of a Balinese dagger. However, Lumet decided this was unsubtle and cut much of this, only keeping the dagger to portray ancient impulses.

Despite being a British and American production set in Hampshire, England, filming took place entirely in and around Ontario, Canada. The scenes in the stable and Alan's room were filmed in the Toronto International Film Studio in Kleinburg, while downtown Hampshire was doubled with Georgetown and Halton Hills. The Strang family house was a real house located in the Toronto suburb of Riverdale. The film was produced during the height of the "tax shelter era" of Canadian filmmaking, in which foreign producers flocked to the country in order to take advantage of the Capital Cost Allowance which allowed investors to deduct up to a 100% of a film's budget provided it met certain requirements. That, combined with the value of the Canadian dollar and abundance of cheaper crew and locations than those found abroad, led to a boom period in Canadian filmmaking.

A local young actor, Ian D. Clark, had a small part in the film but was also stand-in for Burton. He spent six weeks in the studios at Kleinburg, with Lumet directing and Shaffer there every day. Clark has said of this "Acting schools weren’t common then, and I had no formal acting training. I learned on the job, by doing, by watching people who were better than me. And those six weeks on Equus were like a master class with the masters – Burton and Lumet."

== Reception ==
=== Critical reception ===
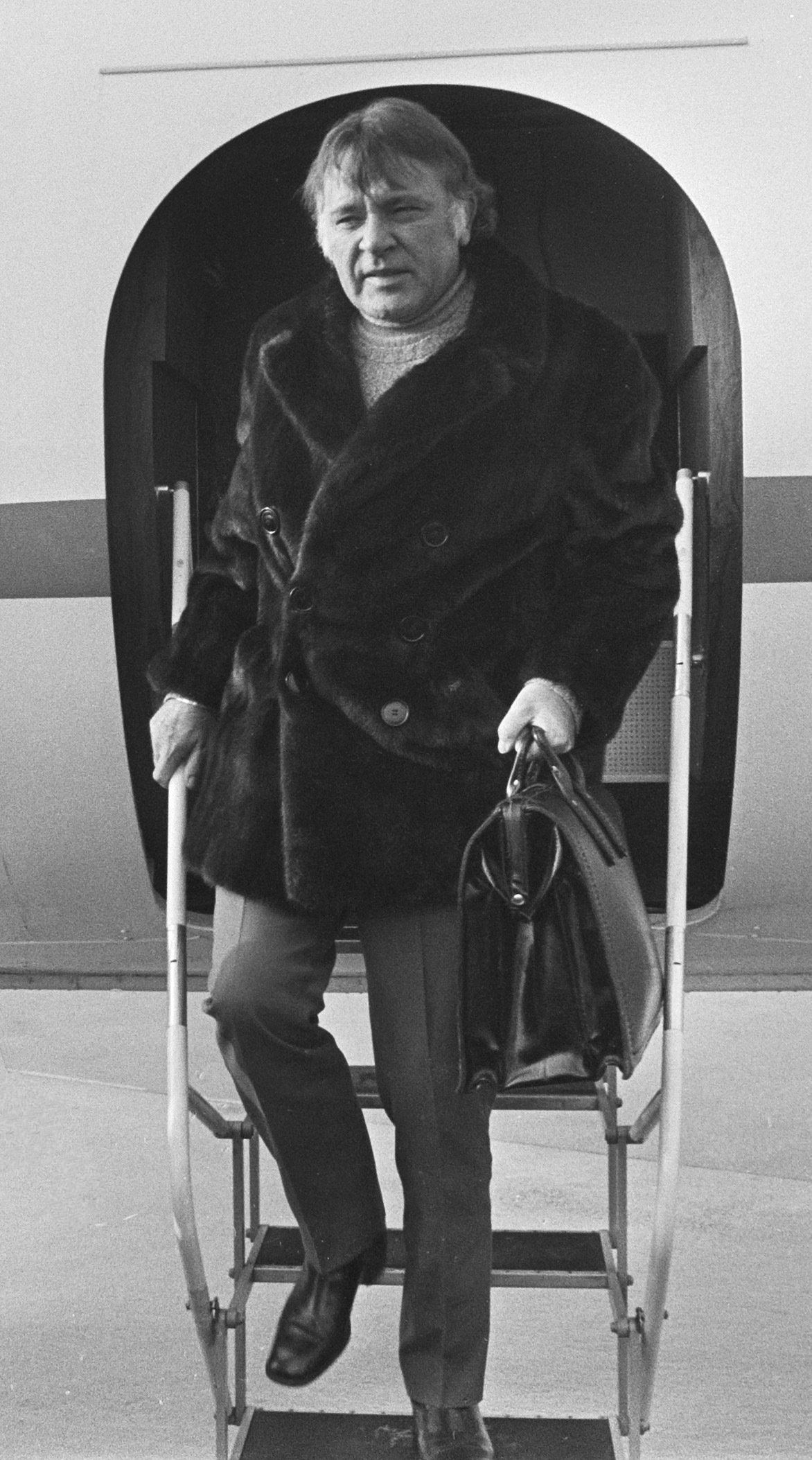
Richard Burton's performance received positive reviews, earning him a nomination for the Academy Award for Best Actor.

Lumet acknowledged that the film was "very vulnerable to attack", and critics were bound to ask why a film was needed when the play was "perfect", but initial reviews were "respectful". Roger Ebert gave the film two and a half stars, arguing the realism in actual horses and their blinding, "strangely enough, get in the way of the play's own reality: the obsession that the two characters come to share"; however, Ebert complimented Burton and Firth on their performances. Vincent Canby, chief critic for The New York Times, wrote that he preferred the theatricality of the stage production, but "Now, after seeing Sidney Lumet's comparatively realistic film version, it's possible to appreciate Mr. Shaffer's text for what it is— an extraordinarily skillful, passionate inquiry into the entire Freudian method". Canby also found the movie's realism excessive, and said that "the movie exhausts us with information", specifically citing the scene where Alan rides a horse bareback as giving the viewers "anticlimactic detail". Canby also concluded "This is the best Burton performance since Who's Afraid of Virginia Woolf?" Molly Haskell's review in New York remarked that the film came "not a moment too soon" for fans of the play, and that Burton was eloquent, Firth "brings out the ugly and unpleasant qualities of the boy", while Jenny Agutter "is rudely treated as the girl who, in another of those preposterous conventions of sixties [sic] movies, offers herself nude to the sensitive youth only to have him spurn her". Jesse Kornbluth, writing for Texas Monthly, called the film "an unqualified success", even though he felt the play was only of interest to "middle-brow" audiences.

English Professor James M. Welsh felt using real horses in the film was understandable, but argued the outdoor scenes infringed on the "abstract theatrical design" that gave the play its creativity. Welsh also felt the explicit blinding was "potentially repulsive", and "much of the spirit of the play is lost as a consequence".

The film received generally positive reviews, currently holding a 70% rating on Rotten Tomatoes, based on 23 reviews. In 2005, the American Film Institute nominated Richard Rodney Bennett's music for AFI's 100 Years of Film Scores.

=== Accolades ===
Award	Year	Category	Recipient(s)	Result	Ref(s)
Academy Awards	1978	Best Actor	Richard Burton	Nominated	
Academy Awards	1978	Best Supporting Actor	Peter Firth	Nominated	
Academy Awards	1978	Best Adapted Screenplay	Peter Shaffer	Nominated	
BAFTA Awards	1978	Best Screenplay	Peter Shaffer	Nominated	
BAFTA Awards	1978	Best Supporting Actress	Jenny Agutter	Won	
BAFTA Awards	1978	Best Supporting Actress	Joan Plowright	Nominated	
BAFTA Awards	1978	Best Supporting Actor	Colin Blakely	Nominated	
BAFTA Awards	1978	Best Music	Richard Rodney Bennett	Nominated	
Golden Globes	1978	Best Actor – Motion Picture Drama	Richard Burton	Won	
Golden Globes	1978	Best Supporting Actor – Motion Picture	Peter Firth	Won	
National Board of Review	1977	Top Ten Films		Won	

== See also ==
- List of films about horses
