= Jake Cannavale =

American actor and musician

- Born: May 1, 1995 (age 31)
- Occupations: Actor; musician
- Years active: 2012–present
- Parents: Bobby Cannavale; Jenny Lumet
- Relatives: Sidney Lumet (maternal grandfather); Lena Horne (maternal great–grandmother)

Jacob Lumet Cannavale (born May 1, 1995) is an American actor and musician.

== Biography ==
He appeared on Broadway in 2015 in the comedy Fish in the Dark by Larry David. He has also appeared on television's Nurse Jackie and The Mandalorian.

He is the son of actor Bobby Cannavale and screenwriter Jenny Lumet, a grandson of film director Sidney Lumet and great-grandson of singer/actress Lena Horne.

== Filmography ==
=== Film ===
Year	Title	Role	Notes
2005	Romance & Cigarettes	Fryberg Friend	credited as Jacob Lumet-Cannavale
2014	Send	Boy	short film
2014	Grapes	Him	short film
2015	Fade	Luke	short film
2016	Interior Teresa	Major	short film
2017	Moths & Butterflies	Bumphrey Hogart	short film
2018	Limit of Wooded Country	Lucas	short film
2019	Eat Brains Love	Jake Stephens	
2023	Inside Man	Chris Rosenberg	
2026	F*ck Valentine's Day	Johnny Giovinazzo	

=== Television ===
Year	Title	Role	Notes
2012	Nurse Jackie	Charlie Cruz	7 episodes
2017	Untitled Jenny Lumet Project	Keith	TV movie
2018	The Elevator	Owen	1 episode
2019	The Mandalorian	Toro Calican	episode: "Chapter 5: The Gunslinger"
2019	Murderville	Gregory Walter Jefferson	TV movie
2022	The Offer	Caesar	Miniseries, 10 episodes
2024	American Sports Story	Chris	Miniseries, 4 episodes
2026	Scarpetta	Young Pete Marino	Main role

=== Theatre ===
Year	Title	Role	Venue	Notes
2015	Fish in the Dark	Diego Melendez	Cort Theatre	
