= Hidden =

Hidden or The Hidden may refer to:

== Film and television ==
=== Film ===
- The Hidden (1987 film), an American science fiction/horror film
- Hidden (2005 film) or Caché, a French thriller film
- The Hidden (2005 film), a Spanish-British-Italian psychological thriller film
- Hidden (2009 film), a Norwegian horror film
- Hidden 3D, a 2011 Italian-Canadian horror film
- Hidden (2015 film), an American psychological thriller film

=== Television ===
- Hidden (2011 TV series), a British political drama series
- Hidden (2018 TV series), a Welsh/English police drama series
- "Hidden" (The 4400), an episode
- "Hidden" (Smallville), an episode
- "The Hidden" (The Penguins of Madagascar), an episode

== Literature ==
- Hidden (Torchwood), a 2008 audiobook based on the TV series Torchwood
- Hidden, a 2012 House of Night novel by P. C. Cast and Kristin Cast
- The Hidden (Animorphs novel), a 2000 Animorphs novel
- The Hidden, a 2004 novel by Sarah Pinborough
- The Hidden (Golding novel), a 2021 novel by Melanie Golding

== Music ==
- Hidden (Coma Virus album), 1996
- Hidden (These New Puritans album), 2010
- Hidden (Titiyo album), 2008

== People ==
- Hidden (surname)
- L'Encobert (died 1522), or "The Hidden", Spanish rebel leader in the Revolt of the Brotherhoods in Valencia

== Other uses ==
- The Hidden (video game), a 2005 multiplayer mod for the computer game Half Life 2
- Hidden Report, Anthony Hidden's 1989 report on the 1988 Clapham Junction rail crash
- Amun, meaning "The Hidden", an Ancient Egyptian deity
