= Hidden (surname) =

Hidden is a surname, and may refer to:

- Anthony Hidden (1936–2016), British judge
- Genevieve Hidden (1926–2016), French surgeon
- George Hidden (c.1527 – 1581 or later), English Member of Parliament in 1558
- Henry B. Hidden (c.1839–1862), Union Army officer of the American Civil War
- Maria L. T. Hidden (1847 - 1924), American suffragist, temperance activist, and politician
- Peter Hidden, Australian jurist and judge

== See also ==
- Hilden (surname)
