= Go Fish (disambiguation) =

Go Fish is a simple card game.

Go Fish may also refer to:

In film and television:

- Go Fish (film), a 1994 American lesbian-themed film
- Go Fish (TV series), a 2001 American sitcom starring Kieran Culkin
- "Go Fish" (Buffy the Vampire Slayer), an episode of Buffy the Vampire Slayer
- "Go Fish" (The Penguins of Madagascar), an episode of The Penguins of Madagascar
- Go Fish Pictures, a specialty film distribution subsidiary of DreamWorks
- Go Fish, a 2019 animated film by Arcana Studio

In other media:

- Go Fish, a comic strip by J. C. Duffy

== See also ==
- "Go Fishing", a song by Roger Waters from The Pros and Cons of Hitch Hiking
