= Roomie (disambiguation) =

A roomie, or roommate, is a person who shares living quarters.

Roomie or Roomies may also refer to:

- Roomie (internet personality) (Joel Berghult, born 1988), Swedish YouTuber and singer
- Roomies (TV series), a 1987 American sitcom
- Roomie the Lion, mascot of the Southeastern Louisiana Lions and Lady Lions
- Roomies!, a webcomic by David Willis
- "Roomies", an episode of TV series Drifters
- "Roomies", episode 22 of season 1 of The Penguins of Madagascar
