= Hilden (disambiguation) =

Hilden is a city in the German Bundesland of North Rhine-Westphalia.

Hilden may also refer to:

- Hilden (surname)
- Hilden, Nova Scotia, a community in Colchester County, Nova Scotia
- Hilden railway station, a railway station in County Antrim, Northern Ireland
