= Little Darlings (Golding novel) =

2019 British thriller by Melanie Golding

- Author: Melanie Golding
- Language: English
- Genre: Thriller
- Publisher: HarperCollins (Canada), Crooked Lane Books (US and UK)
- Publication date: April 30, 2019

Little Darlings is a 2019 thriller novel by British writer Melanie Golding about a new mother who suspects that a supernatural entity is attempting to abduct her children. It received a 2019 Dragon Award for Best Horror Novel.

== Background ==
Little Darlings is the debut novel of author Melanie Golding. The book is based on changeling folklore, in which human children are abducted by fairies and replaced with fairy children. It was partly inspired by Golding's personal theory that folktales about changelings were a way to explain postpartum psychosis in premodern times. She had discussed maternal bonding with psychologists and other women and found it was often a gradual process despite the popular perception that mothers will feel a "rush of love" when they first see their child. She described this misconception as a "modern folktale".

Golding had first begun working on a short story about changelings set in the modern day because the folklore frightened her, which became much longer than she originally planned. While researching for the story, she found that similar folktales were common across cultures. She wrote the novel as part of her master's degree in creative writing at Bath Spa University.

Golding also wanted to write a novel that depicted pregnancy and childbirth in a way that was not "sugarcoated" because she felt that the physical difficulties involved were often downplayed to pregnant women, including herself in the past. She stated that after giving birth, she felt as if she had been given unrealistic expectations of childbirth and wanted the protagonist to have a "fairly standard birth experience" that represented the pain and hardships of the process. She also noted the absence of negative birth experiences in the fiction she had read up to that point.

Selverton, the fictional town in which the story takes place, is based upon the real life village of Ashopton which was submerged to create the Ladybower Reservoir.

== Plot ==
Lauren Tranter awakens in the maternity ward after giving birth to her twin sons. While there, a strange woman accosts her and says she is going to trade Lauren's children for her own fish-like offspring. Her experience is discounted by the hospital staff who find no evidence of the strange woman. After returning home, she finds herself overwhelmed recovering from a traumatic childbirth while keeping up with her responsibilities as a stay at home mom. Her husband Patrick is uninvolved and she begins to feel increasingly isolated as her fears that the woman from the maternity ward is stalking her are dismissed by authorities as psychosis. Only one detective, Jo Harper, believes that something is really happening to Lauren. Jo starts a personal investigation, learning about a similar case from 40 years ago.

After Lauren's children disappear, she is distraught until police recover them. However, she soon suspects that the infants are imposters who were exchanged for her real sons. She attempts to drown the newly found infants in a local reservoir, believing this to be the only way to bring back her abducted children, and is institutionalized in a psychiatric hospital.

== Publication history ==
Golding reportedly received a six figure publishing deal from HarperCollins for the book. It was published by HarperCollins in Canada and Crooked Lane Books in the United States and United Kingdom. It was published on April 30, 2019. The character of Jo Harper appeared in Golding's second novel The Hidden.

British film director Roger Michell purchased the rights to adapt the book and began writing a screenplay based on it prior to its publication. In 2018, Deadline Hollywood reported that Michell and producer Kevin Loader were producing a film based on the book. Michell died in 2021.

== Reception ==
The book received mostly positive reviews from critics, who praised its plot, eerie writing style, characterization, and exploration of themes related to childbirth and parental anxiety. The book's ending was noted for its ambiguity, which left it unclear whether the events portrayed were caused by supernatural interference or Lauren's psychosis. Golding said that she intentionally played into this ambiguity, but wrote as if both interpretations were true. Kirkus Reviews gave the book a starred review, writing that it "skillfully walks the line between psychological and supernatural horror". Joe Hartlaub of Book Reporter described it as "an excruciatingly frightening but nonetheless irresistible tale".

It appeared in several publications lists of the best thriller books in 2019. Hailey Swint of PopSugar included it on a list of "13 Thrillers That Should Be Movies".

=== Awards ===
The book won "Best Horror Novel" at the 2019 Dragon Awards. It was nominated for "Best Debut" at the 2019 Ladies of Horror Fiction Awards.
