= The Penguins of Madagascar season 2 =

The Penguins of Madagascar
- Season 2
- No. of episodes: 68

Release
- Original network: Nickelodeon
- Original release: March 13, 2010 – March 31, 2012

Season chronology
- ← Previous; Season 1 Next → Season 3

This is a list of episodes for the second season of DreamWorks Animation's animated television series, The Penguins of Madagascar. It began airing on Nickelodeon in the United States on March 13, 2010, and concluded on March 31, 2012.

== Episodes ==
No. overall	No. in season	Title	Written by	Storyboard by	Original release date	Prod. code	US viewers (millions)
49	1	"The Red Squirrel"	Brandon Sawyer	Wolf-Rüdiger Bloss	March 13, 2010	201a	4.3
After the penguins discover him in an underground bunker, legendary penguin agent Buck Rockgut drafts them to assist with apprehending the Red Squirrel, a top penguin enemy once brought down by Rockgut who has since escaped. Severely paranoid that they may be Red Squirrel agents, Rockgut begins to detain several zoo animals. Throughout, only Private believes such is wrong. He eventually tries using Fred as a Red Squirrel stand-in to trick Rockgut, but it backfires when Rockgut suspects Private of being the Red Squirrel himself. The other three penguins soon recognize Rockgut's errant paranoia and get him to leave by telling him the real Red Squirrel was in a made-up place called "Grrfurjiclestan". Later, a periscope is shown and it is shown that the Red Squirrel is real. Special guest star: Clancy Brown as Buck Rockgut
50	2	"It's About Time"	Bill Motz & Bob Roth	David Chlystek	March 13, 2010	201b	4.3
After creating a time machine called the "Chronotron," Kowalski is in need of one final chemical before he can fire it up for time travel. However, when he and the other penguins are out to obtain it, Kowalski's future self appears to Private and instructs him to not allow his present self to complete the Chronotron, lest great chaos in the future result. Later, as Private has no success in foiling the Chronotron, another future Kowalski appears to Skipper to ensure that his future self instead build the Chronotron. Eventually, the three Kowalskis see each other, creating a black hole in space-time. Two Kowalskis use the Chronotron to travel back in time, thus becoming those who had appeared to Skipper and Private. The space-time hole is then shut when Rico throws the Chronotron into it.
51	3	"Gator Watch"	Bill Motz & Bob Roth	Wolf-Rüdiger Bloss	May 15, 2010	204a	3.8
While the penguins are visiting with him in his sewer home, Roger, their alligator friend, states that he hates having to live there, but that he loves being in New York so much that he is willing to endure it. The penguins soon decide to help Roger find a better place to live in the city. They first hide Roger inside a log in a nearby pond, but a lady sees him and screams. They try hiding him as a display in a museum next, but Roger blows his cover by becoming "alive" when a boy pokes him. Following this, the penguins try to hide Roger on a rooftop as a gargoyle, but Roger, afraid of heights, soon falls into a public pool below. Throughout all this, the attempts to relocate Roger make TV news headlines, in a segment called "Gator Watch". While trying next to evade humans, Roger unwittingly enters onto a stage via a building's backdoor and is soon captured by animal control. The penguins then set off after the van transporting Roger to break him out, but they fail to do so before the vehicle arrives at its destination: a well-suited habitat at the Central Park Zoo.
52	4	"In the Line of Doody"	Brandon Sawyer	Steve Loter	May 15, 2010	204b	3.8
In anticipation of the arrival of the zoo commissioner, a security detail quickly examines the zoo and its animals for threats. But as they leave, Skipper believes that the agents have done an inadequate job, so he and the other penguins take it upon themselves to ensure the zoo is safe for the commissioner's arrival to cut the ribbon on a new children's zoo. In doing so, they soon uncover that a pigeon, Frankie (Jeff Bennett), has plotted to "drop one" on the commissioner's suit in retaliation for his implementation of anti-pigeon park regulations. Skipper then tells the other penguins about how he had failed to act under similar circumstances when the previous commissioner had been attacked with bird droppings containing blueberries, vowing to not let the same happen again. The penguins then chase after Frankie, with Skipper flying through the air using a jet-pack, but the pigeon soon ends up releasing his blueberry-infused vendetta. Skipper dives in When Kowalski informs him that "The package has dropped" and takes the hit for the commissioner, and his team is horrified at the resulting look of their leader. Fortunately, however, Skipper reveals that he was wearing a "pigeon-proof vest" as he pulls it off his body. The vest is soon launched at Frankie via a makeshift cannon, resulting in the pigeon suffering the same fate he had intended for the commissioner. Guest star: Gary Cole as The Commissioner
53	5	"Can't Touch This"	Bill Motz & Bob Roth	Tom Bernardo	June 19, 2010	207a	3.7
When the penguins hear the scream of a child, they soon learn it was the result of a boy having been bitten by a sheep at the zoo's petting zoo. Appalled by the sheep's attack, the penguins set off at night to retaliate against him. However, the sheep, Randy, soon tells the penguins that he was provoked to bite the boy because the boy had, among other things, beaten on him and had pulled out a clump of his wool. Convinced that they had wrongly judged Randy, the penguins decide to help him out to prevent further abuse by rowdy children. When their attempts at applying a slippery polymer, building up static electricity on Randy's wool, and hypnosis fail, the penguins decide to transport Randy to a farm to live out the rest of his life. Randy is soon taken to a farm by the penguins in a truck, but shortly after his arrival, Randy is horrified at the appearance of the other sheep there, who are sheered and appear to be in a cult-like trance. Consequently, Randy ends up back at the petting zoo, but when the same boy approaches him to attack him again, Randy kicks him away. It is then revealed that Skipper and Rico had taught Randy some of their commando fighting moves. Special guest star: Will Friedle as Randy
54	6	"Hard Boiled Eggy"	Brandon Sawyer	Sean Kreiner, Fred Osmond and Christo Stamboliev	June 19, 2010	207b	3.7
While the penguins are engaged in a training exercise, Eggy the duckling enters the HQ, acting in a commando-like fashion. His mother soon locates him there, and tells the penguins that Eggy has been behaving that way ever since their egg-watching adventure. As requested by Eggy's mother, the penguins agree to work with Eggy to convince him that he is not suited to engage in their para-military operations. But when he persists in desiring to become a commando, Skipper leads Eggy to believe that he needs to have a "Penguin Commando License" in order to partake in their operations, and that being able to tackle all the zoo has to offer is requisite for obtaining such. Although briefly successful, this plan soon backfires when Eggy begins to take down all the zoo animals, using the specialized characteristics of each of the penguins that he had learned from them while still in the egg state. Eventually, Julien is the last animal that Eggy had not yet beaten, and thus the only thing standing between him and his "license". But Julien, upon learning that "[his] J.J." (Eggy) wanted to become a penguin, begins dancing to music, and Eggy fails to bring him down as a result. Eggy is then cured of his commando desires but, to the dismay of the penguins, now has taken up Julien's behaviors.
55	7	"The Lost Treasure of the Golden Squirrel"	Eddie Guzelian	Tom Bernardo and Christo Stamboliev	July 19, 2010	205	N/A
One century ago, the Golden Squirrel places the key to a hidden treasure into a time capsule to be buried in commemoration of the opening of the Central Park Zoo. When the time capsule is opened in the present day, the race is soon on between the penguins, lemurs, Marlene, and Fred to reach the legendary treasure before King Rat and his minions do. However, matters become complicated for the zoo gang along the way when the rats catch up to them and carry away Marlene in a failed attempt to gain possession of the key to the treasure. Later, the group displays symptoms of infighting when they confront their individual depraved desires for what could be done with the treasure once claimed, a curse forewarned by a mysterious, elderly squirrel who had stated prior that the treasure had to be destroyed. Eventually, after having gotten a hold of the key, the rats locate the treasure, but the gang soon catches up to them. Following a little more fighting amongst the group, it is revealed that Julien, as the "pure-hearted one" among them, is immune to the treasure's curse due to already having everything he could want, his kingdom and friends, and he proceeds to dispose of the treasure. When the animals return to the zoo and discuss their adventure, a pigeon comes by and asks Private to guard a crystal feather, but everyone but Skipper soon disperses, not wanting anything to do with another ancient mystery. Special guest star: Debbie Reynolds as Granny Squirrel Note: This is a half-hour episode.
56	8	"Fit to Print"	Eddie Guzelian	Steve Loter	July 19, 2010	209b	N/A
The lemurs interrupt the penguins playing computer solitaire in the zoo office in order to sneak a peek at the zoo's new advertising campaign photo, which features the lemurs. After being chastised by the penguins for creating a threat of being seen by humans, Julien points out that the penguins can be seen in the background of the approved ad photo in commando fashion, seemingly unaware that their photo was being taken. Back at their HQ, the penguins decide to set out to digitally remove themselves from the image before it is sent to the ad agency. Whilst attempting to do so at the photographer's house, however, Kowalski inadvertently sends an enlarged version of the incriminating area of the photo to the ad executives. Their situation is made progressively worse when their visit to the ad agency results in the photo being sent to the printer with the caption "Killer Commando Penguins," and then when their attempt to reconfigure the 10,000-copy print job at the print shop instead results in a 1,000,000-copy authorization. When their final attempt to stop the presses results in the foursome being caught up in and inked-up by the machinery, they retreat to the HQ, convinced their covert ops will soon be exposed. However, the new ad which Alice reveals, of penguin body shapes splatted on a white background, keeps their operations secret.
57	9	"Operation: Cooties"	Ivory Floyd	Tom Bernardo and Sean Kreiner	July 19, 2010	210a	N/A
When Marlene comes to the penguins' habitat with leaves she says act as an "organic moisturizer," Private, Kowalski, and Rico rub them over their bodies, as does Marlene. Meanwhile, Julien observes a group of schoolchildren running around, some claiming to have gotten "cooties" from others. This observation soon starts a panic when he, Maurice, and Mort come to the penguins' habitat and report this ailment, which Kowalski concludes is spread by the touch of girls. When the group observes Marlene in Burt's habitat and both of them itching, they infer that the otter has cooties and should be avoided whenever she is around. When Mort is thrown at her by Julien, he is quarantined by the penguins, as are Private, Kowalski, and Rico when they exhibit itching symptoms. Eventually, Marlene comes to the penguins' HQ looking for a cure for her itchiness, but is sent away by Skipper after she chases and touches him. Alice soon finds her, however, and she and the penguins are placed in an oatmeal bath in the vet for relief from what they soon learn from the doctor is poison ivy – Marlene's so-called moisturizer. Private wonders if someone should tell Julien, but Skipper thinks it's no rush. Meanwhile, Julien, Maurice, and all the animals are in the shop itching like crazy.
58	10	"Mr. Tux"	Eddie Guzelian	Wolf-Rüdiger Bloss	July 19, 2010	211a	N/A
An armadillo who goes by "The Amarillo Kid" enters the penguins' habitat looking for someone he knows simply as "Mr. Tux". Private admits to being him, and the Amarillo Kid insists that Private engage in some sort of "unfinished business" with him, but Private refuses. Soon, the nature of Private and the Amarillo Kid's past is shown: Private was once a skilled mini golf player, but quit the sport after a tough game against the Amarillo Kid forced him to have to ricochet a ball off a young opossum girl's ice cream cone, ruining it. Private is blackmailed by Amarillo Kid to do another round of mini golf only after he sets the penguins' HQ to self destruct and locks-down the rest of the zoo. When Private's game-winning putt comes a mere fraction of an inch from going into the hole, the Amarillo Kid celebrates his long-awaited defeat of Mr. Tux. But Private's ball then rolls in, giving him the victory, with an assist by a cricket Private had avoided hitting earlier while driving the penguins' car.
59	11	"Concrete Jungle Survival"	Brandon Sawyer	Steve Loter	July 19, 2010	211b	N/A
Private desires a promotion after Skipper forbids him to look at a joke contained in a classified mission file. Skipper agrees to such a promotion, but only if Private can pass a one-on-one survival test against "the most fearsome beast in the concrete jungle" on the streets of New York, where he is soon taken. Left alone in an alley, Private is passed a cassette player by the other penguins containing audio instructions on how to outwit this enemy. However, Private's test is soon interrupted by the arrival of the lemurs, who believe they are on a camping trip and consistently get in the way of Private trying to follow the tape's directive. Eventually, Kowalski reveals the specificity of the enemy Private must confront through song: an evil, ghostly city bus notorious for making roadkill out of animals known as the "Graveyard Eight". In order to pass his test, Private must confront the bus and bring back a souvenir from it. This inevitable confrontation occurs when the bus comes by while the lemurs are "sewer fishing" and entangles their fishing lines in its bumper, taking them with it as Private races to catch up. Julien soon gets himself free, but goes inside the bus with Private to look for something sharp to free the others, which Private accomplishes with the name badge of the driver, a short, elderly woman with a deep, demonic voice. For his successful encounter with the Graveyard Eight, Private is promoted to Private First Class. He is finally able to read the joke, but in the end, he doesn't quite understand it.
60	12	"Stop Bugging Me"	Bill Motz & Bob Roth	Doug Murphy	September 4, 2010	203a	N/A
Private is distraught when cockroaches appear in the HQ, taken in by Rico when threatened by an exterminator. In order to help the cockroaches return to where they originated, the penguins and roaches set out on a mission to defeat the exterminator. Following a long stakeout, Officer X, now an exterminator, arrives on the scene, and soon manages to tie up Skipper, Kowalski, and Rico as Private slips away. To save his teammates and defeat X, Private temporarily suppresses his feelings of disgust and covers himself with numerous roaches, which crawl off him and into X's clothing when the lights are turned off. X subsequently runs out of the building and Private suffers a delayed case of "the willies". Special guest stars: Jerry Trainor as the lead roach, Zand Broumand and Brian Posehn as other roaches
61	13	"Field Tripped"	Todd Garfield	Sean Kreiner	September 4, 2010	203b	N/A
After securing pretzels from a pretzel cart, the penguins notice that a boy on a school field trip had observed their operation, and believe him to be composing a dossier on them. Rather than take immediate action against him, Skipper instead wants to focus on the boy's "spy master," and they soon discover a museum brochure which has an exhibit on Madagascar, further adding to Skipper's suspicions on the boy. Julien then comes by and notices that his "royal booty scratcher" was in the photo of the museum display and requests the penguins get it back for him. When they turn him down, Julien assembles a ragtag "team" of his own to do the mission instead, with Mort taking on the role Skipper would for the penguins, Fred for Kowalski, Maurice for Rico, and Julien himself for Private. Meanwhile, the penguins observe the boy, Ronald, telling his teacher about having seen their operations, but the teacher rejects his account. Shortly after, the school group leaves for the museum. At the museum, the lemur-led group pursues Julien's booty scratcher and the penguins attempt to get a hold of Ronald's notebook, leading him to again tell his teacher about being pursued by the zoo penguins. The penguins ultimately fail to obtain Ronald's notebook before the children leave the museum, in part because they got Julien's scratcher for him, but they successfully use a brainwashing helmet on the teacher after she reads Ronald's report. Special guest star: Nathan Kress as Ronald
62	14	"Badger Pride"	Bill Motz & Bob Roth	Tom Bernardo	September 4, 2010	212b	N/A
After the penguins' short mission to recover a wild Marlene from the park after she had accidentally been knocked into it, Private learns that the zoo had acquired a badger exhibit. Afraid, Private begins to panic, but Marlene drags him to the exhibit to meet the badgers and get over his fear. When the two meet the friendly badgers, Becky and Stacy, all four soon become friends and spend the rest of the day together. But after the badgers surprise Marlene in her habitat that night, make her partake in undesired adventures, and fail to leave her alone, Marlene insists that they stop "badgering" her. Becky takes the remark as an insult, and Marlene soon fears retaliation from the angry badgers. Later, in a chase, Marlene and the badgers end up in the park, knocked into it by tennis balls launched by Private, where Marlene reverts to her wild form and easily takes down Becky and Stacy in a one-sided tussle. Special guest stars: Victoria Justice as Stacy and Jennette McCurdy as Becky
63	15	"Kaboom and Kabust"	Brandon Sawyer	Christo Stamboliev	September 11, 2010	202a	3.9
After Julien interrupts the penguins' mission to destroy classified files with an undisclosed problem, Skipper dispatches Rico to take care of the matter. At the lemur habitat, Julien complains to Rico about a nearby billboard which he finds bothersome, which Rico soon destroys with dynamite. Having been denied the usage of dynamite in the destruction of the files earlier, Rico greatly enjoys his work, even after the other penguins come over to investigate the blast. Julien then desires more things blown up, but when Skipper warns of the consequences of an uncontrolled, wild Rico, Julien and Rico agree not to continue. However, the two soon act to the contrary and engage in a montage of blowing things up. Eventually, dynamite-happy Rico reaches his breaking point due to all the "psychotic pressure" built up inside him in consequence to his frenzy of creating explosions, and he begins to use his own body as a walking wrecking ball. To protect the zoo from Rico's destruction, the penguins and the lemurs trap Rico underneath Julien's bounce house, which Kowalski believes will serve as an "ideal lunacy absorber". The plan works, and soon Rico falls asleep, tired out by his "48 hours of uncontrolled mayhem".
64	16	"The Helmet"	John Behnke & Rob Humphrey	Steve Loter	September 11, 2010 (Note: This episode was first released in Happy King Julien Day DVD on August 10, 2010)	202b	3.9
Kowalski has invented a helmet that turns thoughts into actions, essentially granting the wearer the power of psychokinesis, which he dubs "the Helmet". While the penguins are playing with its power, King Julien notices it and becomes incredibly jealous. Late that night, Julien steals it and claims it as a crown to use its power for himself. Now with unparalleled powers, King Julien fires Maurice, now no longer needing his services since the Helmet now provides everything he needs, and continues to abuse the Helmet's power for himself. However, upon setting its power to 10 (the highest), Julien's thoughts and words become reality and cause chaos in the zoo until it eventually creates a tornado of telekinetic objects. In the end, however, the penguins separate the helmet from King Julien's head, ending the telekinetic madness (but at the same time burning off all his head hair) and Maurice returns to serve King Julien by giving him his old crown back to hide his baldness.
65	17	"Night and Dazed"	Kurt Weldon	Emmanuel Deligiannis	September 18, 2010	206a	4.2
In the course of testing the HQ's new evacuation system, Private is flung into the koala habitat. When it soon becomes night, the marsupial, Leonard, awakens, terrified of Private since he is one of the zoo's "dangerously psychotic" penguins. After assuring Leonard that he has no intent to hurt him, Private leaves the koala habitat, only to return the next day to find him unconscious. Fearing for him, Private brings the koala back to the HQ, where Kowalski explains that koalas are nocturnal and Leonard himself awakens from his slumber as night approaches. While there, Leonard is accidentally launched from the now-overhauled HQ evacuation system and touches down in Midtown, provoking the penguins to set out to find him and bring him back to the zoo. Soon after locating him, however, their situation becomes more difficult when Leonard falls asleep in the daylight. Eventually, the team manages to get the sleeping Leonard back into the zoo just shy of nightfall, and once night comes, Leonard awakens and spots Marlene and fears her in the same manner he had the penguins, which Skipper chalks up to Marlene apparently having a bad reputation herself. Special guest star: Dana Snyder as Leonard
66	18	"The Big Squeeze"	Dean Stefan	Sean Kreiner	September 18, 2010 (Note: This episode was first released in New to the Zoo DVD on August 10, 2010.)	206b	4.2
When a boa constrictor arrives at the zoo from Hoboken, Skipper and Kowalski warn of the snake's dangers at a zoovenir shop meeting. Shortly thereafter, when Mort goes missing, the penguins confront the boa, Savio, to see if he had any role in the disappearance, but it is apparent from the configuration of his habitat that he had no means of escaping the enclosure. Later, when Maurice and Marlene go missing, the penguins continue to suspect Savio of eating the small mammals, and soon send Private out as bait, dressed as a monkey. When he disappears, the other penguins and Julien confront Savio once again, whereupon he breaks free from his enclosure by sending his tail through a ventilation shaft and deactivating his habitat's electronic locks via a keypad. Savio consumes Julien during the ensuing confrontation, but is ultimately defeated by Burt, who smacks Savio around before forcing those eaten to be expelled. Savio is then sent back to Hoboken the following morning. Special guest star: Nestor Carbonell as Savio
67	19	"Wishful Thinking"	Bill Motz & Bob Roth	Wolf-Rüdiger Bloss	October 2, 2010	208a	3.8
After being accidentally knocked under a pile of pennies, Private is ordered to get rid of the coinage. While at the zoo's fountain to do so, Private notices Mort biting into a penny and advises him to toss it into the fountain to make a wish instead. Wishing for gumballs, Mort tosses the penny in and, to the serendipitous surprise of Private, gets them, leading Private to conclude that the fountain is magic. After telling the other penguins, Skipper warns that the fountain should be kept secret for fear of a careless wish wreaking havoc or exposing their operations, and limits his men to one wish each. However, Julien soon learns of the fountain's power through Mort, as does the rest of the zoo through Julien's exposure. Following the penguins warning the other animals about the potential dangers, Alice spots Private out of his habitat, but he manages to get away from her. But Alice then finds a penny and tosses it into the fountain, wishing she knew what the story was with the penguins. Her wish triggers Kowalski to accidentally blow his plasma blaster, which he had wished for, through the top of the penguin habitat, exposing their HQ to Alice and soon resulting in the foursome being caged to be studied and dissected by the government. But just as the penguins' future looks bleak, Private manages to get a penny into the fountain as the caged penguins pass by it and unwishes everything, setting things back to normal. Kowalski then convinces Private that his belief in the magic fountain was a delusion caused by Private's bump on the head, but Burt is seen with a French baguette and wearing a beret, and since he had wished for a trip to Paris, suggests that it may not have been a delusion after all.
68	20	"April Fools"	Bill Motz & Bob Roth	Emmanuel Deligiannis	October 2, 2010	208b	3.8
After Julien discovers that Mort ate his fudge pops, Mort claims "April fools" in defense. After stating that April fools is not going to suffice due to it now being August, Maurice explains to Julien about how the April Fools' Day concept works each April 1. Enthused, Julien then decides to set about pulling pranks on the zoo animals, claiming that it is OK to do so in August because he had only just learned of the concept. After pranking Burt and Mort, Julien pranks the penguins three separate times claiming falsely that he was in need of their help. After the third occasion, the penguins assemble to engage in "prank resistance training" so they can resist the urge to respond to Julien crying wolf in the future. Meanwhile, Roy becomes infuriated at Julien for drawing on his backside with marker, which soon escalates to the point where Julien now has a real reason to request assistance from the penguins. Now trained to resist, however, the penguins reject that Julien is in dire need, but they later catch up in time to launch sleep grenades at Roy (Danny Jacobs) to save Julien from the rhino's charging wrath. When Roy soon awakens and begins to charge again, however, it is the penguins who have the last laugh when a stuffed penguin takes the blow and Julien momentarily believes it was Skipper.
69	21	"Hello, Dollface"	Brandon Sawyer	Sean Kreiner	October 9, 2010	209a	3.6
While watching TV, Rico learns that the company that designed his doll girlfriend has added voice technology to the toys, allowing them to speak, so he wants one for his doll. Despite their best attempts, the penguins are unable to procure a voice chip but Private obtains a different toy with a similar chip, so Kowalski transplants that chip into Rico's doll. After Julien tells Rico to do whatever the doll says, which Rico takes to the extreme, eventually turning into a hippie, but when the doll suggests to Rico that they become "special friends" Rico is devastated, believing that she no longer loves him. Kowalski tricks Rico into believing that the doll loves him just the way he is and removes the voice chip, leaving Rico happy again.
70	22	"Huffin and Puffin"	Bill Motz & Bob Roth	Wolf-Rüdiger Bloss	October 9, 2010	126b	3.6
While engaged in a training maneuver with the other penguins, Skipper is suddenly accosted by an old foe, a Danish puffin named Hans (John DiMaggio). Hans states that he has come to make peace with Skipper for past injustices, but Skipper refuses to accept the puffin's apologies. Eventually, widely due to the pressure of the other penguins and Marlene, Skipper offers Hans his "flipper in friendship," but the group is soon tied-up by Hans via an "exploding rope bomb" – the whole apology act was a sham. Hans soon brings the group to Julien's plastic volcano to trap them, but the penguins soon escape, leaving Marlene alone. After a chase, Hans locks himself in the penguins' HQ and begins eying their weapons cache. Eventually, after the penguins' failed attempt to steam Hans out of the HQ, Hans and Skipper meet up and fight using fish as swords. Held at fishpoint, Hans begins to cry, stating that he has no home and that his takeover of the HQ was mainly so he could have a place to live. Skipper then arranges to ship Hans to the Hoboken Zoo, a place he describes as a "disease-riddled cesspool".
71	23	"Invention Intervention"	Thomas Hart	Fred Osmond	October 16, 2010	213a	N/A
Despite Skipper forbidding him to invent, Kowalski defies him and constructs an invisibility ray. While testing it in the park, the device itself is accidentally turned invisible when Fred falls on it; shortly, it also gets loose on the streets of New York because of Julien's meddling, firing its laser randomly and rendering objects in the city invisible. The four penguins soon go on a mission to stop the device, Skipper believing Dr. Blowhole is behind the mayhem. The team manages to ram the unseen ray with a bus and Kowalski successfully defuses the device following a resulting overload. Objects once invisible, including the ray itself, become visible again. Kowalski keeps trying to say that the ray was his, but Skipper keeps interrupting Kowalski and still believes it was Blowhole's technology.
72	24	"Cradle and All"	Justin Charlebois	Emmanuel Deligiannis	October 16, 2010	213b	N/A
Kowalski invents a device which predicts the unexpected. When he shows emotional indifference to a device-predicted fall of a child's ice cream, Private mutters "... detect this!" and chucks a fish at him, which Kowalski dodges, but it sets in motion a chain reaction, resulting in a baby stroller rolling out of the zoo. The penguins save it from the peril of traffic, then attempt to calm the baby by changing his diaper and giving him a stuffed penguin. But the stroller soon rolls into a demolition site where the baby gets out and has to be chased around to be reacquired by the penguins. The team eventually manages return the baby and his stroller back to his father without detection, though the stroller soon falls apart as a result of the whole ordeal.
73	25	"Driven to the Brink"	Bill Motz & Bob Roth	Fred Osmond	October 23, 2010 (Note: This episode was first released on I Was a Penguin Zombie DVD on October 5, 2010.)	210b	N/A
After Private and Kowalski fail to impress Skipper during a combat-driving training course, Rico manages to impress him with his reckless driving ability. But after being told not to take the car out at night, Rico disobeys orders and takes it out for a spin and unfortunately wrecks it. He hastily tries to rebuild it, using one of Kowalski's latest inventions, The "Neurotronic laser targeting system". Rico feels guilty for what he's done to the car, meanwhile the automobile soon begins to act "haunted" as it attempts to vengefully run down Rico repeatedly. The penguins soon catch and they attempt to stop the car from hurting Rico. After the car knocks Skipper unconscious, Rico finally gains the courage to save Skipper and destroy the car with a bomb. After the car is destroyed, the Penguins notice Kowalski's targeting system was placed inside and thus Rico admits that he disobeyed orders when he took the car out at night. The Penguins however let him off the hook since Rico had gone through enough punishment when the car was "haunted".
74	26	"Friend-in-a-Box"	Bill Motz & Bob Roth	Sean Kreiner	October 23, 2010	212a	N/A
As Julien rummages through the zoo's lost and found box, he tosses aside a small Game Boy-type video game device which Mort begins playing with, soon believing the game's character to be his friend. Meanwhile, Kowalski unveils a thought-reading device to the other penguins, but it soon catches fire due to its "cheap circuit board". As Mort continues his focus on his new game, Julien becomes disappointed that Mort is no longer obsessing over his feet and giving him the thrill of kicking him off. After failing to get Mort interested in his feet again, Julien teams with Kowalski, who wants to use the game's circuit board for his invention, to separate Mort from the game. The plan works, but the other penguins' disappointment in Kowalski's selfishness prompts him to want to return the circuit board, though it, too, soon malfunctions. The penguins and Julien then procure a new device from a toy store, only to find that Maurice had given Mort a cell phone to pacify him in the interim, which he now finds enjoyment in.
75	27	"Work Order"	Eddie Guzelian	Emmanuel Deligiannis	November 6, 2010	215a	3.8
Following a mission, Private accidentally crashes his airplane into a water main underneath the penguins' habitat, causing water to erupt from it. Alice takes notice and summons a repair man, Gus, whose efforts to repair the leak threaten the secrecy of the penguins' HQ. Although the penguins manage to conduct the repairs before Gus can the next morning, Gus refuses to take credit or payment for repairs he did not do and is determined to perform the service he was hired for, despite repeated sabotages by the penguins. After Skipper contemplates failure, the penguins eventually succeed when they create a fake zoo set-up in the park, which Gus repairs instead. Special guest star: Fred Tatasciore as Gus
76	28	"Hot Ice"	Ross Beeley	Tom Bernardo	November 6, 2010	215b	3.8
To dispose of it while pursued by police, two thieves toss a stolen diamond necklace into the zoo, which lands inside the lemur habitat. Having just made a wish on a star, Julien believes the necklace is his gift from above. After Julien shows his newfound jewels to the penguins the next morning, the penguins soon learn from TV news that the item was stolen. Meanwhile, the thieves return to the zoo to recover the loot but, despite the penguins warning of such, Julien refuses to relinquish the necklace. After taking possession of it, the penguins lead the thieves, who had been ejected from the zoo earlier, into a set-up at the jewelry store, where they are arrested by police. Special guest star: French Stewart as Cecil
77	29	"Command Crisis"	Todd Garfield	Tom Bernardo	November 27, 2010 (Note: This episode was first released in Operation DVD Premiere on February 9, 2010.)	120a	N/A
An accident causes Skipper to believe he is a TV anchorman.
78	30	"Truth Ache"	Bill Motz & Bob Roth	Sean Kreiner	November 27, 2010	120b	N/A
The penguins need to do some damage control after Private reveals the zoo animals' most personal secrets.
79	31	"The All Nighter Before Christmas"	Brandon Sawyer	Wolf-Rüdiger Bloss, Steve Loter, Emmanuel Deligiannis and Tom Bernardo	December 12, 2010	214	N/A
When the zoo closes for the Christmas holiday, the animals gather to begin work on Kidsmas, their annual holiday festivities mainly designed to delight the younger animals. Each animal is assigned a Kidsmas preparation task to perform, but Julien, desiring a different one, rearranges each animals' task. Said shuffling results in the lemurs being tasked with obtaining a Christmas tree, while Skipper has to take on the role of Santa. In hopes of being able to find "Santa's magic," Skipper and Private set out to locate the jolly old man, only to encounter multiple bell-ringing Santas and such look-alikes. Meanwhile, as the lemurs hunt for a tree before ultimately stealing one akin to the one in Rockefeller Center, chaos ensues at the zoo between different groups of animals over whether decorations should be rock and roll-themed or Dickensian. With such disarray, Skipper believes he has failed when the younger animals arrive for Kidsmas, but his spirits are lifted when the real Santa stops by to reassure him. All then embrace the spirit, singing "It ain't perfect, but it's Christmas". Special guest star: Carl Reiner as Santa Claus Notes: This is a 22 minute episode. It was promoted as "Operation: Decoration".
80	32	"Whispers and Coups"	Bill Motz & Bob Roth	Sean Kreiner	January 15, 2011	216a	N/A
Julien suspects a plot to overthrow or kill him is being orchestrated by Maurice after he overhears Maurice conversing with other animals about an ill-sounding plan. After Julien and Mort begin a military-type resistance operation armed with coconuts, the penguins get involved soon after witnessing Maurice distributing pitchforks and torches to other animals. After Kowalski theorizes that Maurice may wish to take over due to having intelligence superior to Julien's, the penguins place Julien and Mort through military training. When Julien, Mort, and the penguins eventually confront the angry mob, however, they learn the assembly's purpose was to throw a surprise party for Julien, all part of an elaborate plan which Julien had wanted after having failed to have been surprised at a previous party.
81	33	"Brush with Danger!"	John Behnke & Rob Humphrey	Fred Osmond	January 15, 2011	216b	N/A
When Burt gets a hold of Alice's paintbrush, he paints a picture of an elephant with it on a nearly wall to the delight of zoo patrons. Meanwhile, Kowalski debuts plans for a device which could save civilization, though it has a 50 percent chance of severe worldly devastation. He ultimately decides to destroy the plans at the same time an art critic has come to look at Burt's paintings, with the plans accidentally blown by helicopter propwash onto one of Burt's easels and subsequently selected by the critic for display at a museum. To ensure that Kowalski's plans are never seen by any evildoing museum patrons, the penguins go to the museum, where Rico erases a plus sign on the diagram, replacing it with a Lunacorn. The critic, however, later rejects the piece due to this change. Guest star: Leigh-Allyn Baker as Bella Bon Bueno
82	34	"Love Hurts"	Brandon Sawyer	Tom Bernardo	February 12, 2011	218b	N/A
After Private is scratched and bruised when a mission goes awry, the other penguins leave him at the veterinary office. There, Private soon becomes smitten with Shawna, a new intern who tends to Private's injuries. Once fixed up, Private ponders the thought of getting injured again in order to see Shawna again, and intentionally does so when the initial mission is given another go. Private repeats this strategy until the others become suspect of his string of bad luck, eventually confronting him while in Shawna's care. Suspecting the others of bullying Private and having "avian insanity fever," Shawna cages and gives them an injection (which Skipper isn't too happy about) and states that Private will never share a habitat with them again. Not wanting to lose his friends, however, Private pretends to have avian insanity fever in order for Shawna to treat him like the rest of the penguins (including the painful injection). Special guest star: Joanna García as Shawna
83	35	"The Officer X Factor"	Tom Krajewski and Eddie Guzelian	Emmanuel Deligiannis	February 12, 2011	218a	N/A
Stuck without water in their habitat during a massive heat wave, the penguins decide to go to the East River to cool off. To effectuate this, they arrange for Alice to go on a cruise for the weekend, but their plans are soon thwarted when Alice's substitute arrives: Officer X. X, still bitter over his past run-ins with the penguins, warns them not to pull any mischief on his watch, and repeatedly catches the penguins each time they attempt to leave the zoo. They eventually create a flying machine from a pretzel cart, but X stows away in its umbrella. In the ensuing confrontation, the penguins accidentally release pretzel salt into the clouds, creating a rainstorm, thus ending the heat wave. X is eventually knocked from the contraption by a cash register drawer and lands on top of the taxi bringing Alice back from her cruise.
84	36	"Brain Drain"	Bill Motz & Bob Roth	Tom Bernardo	February 26, 2011	221b	N/A
Kowalski is complaining about how his brain is not smart enough, and begins to genetically expand his intellect, causing his head to grow bigger. But after making a miscalculation, his head begins to shrink until he becomes dumber than mud. His lack of intellect proves annoying when he fouls up a mission to retrieve fish from a fish truck. The penguins manage to keep Kowalski busy with following a red line in a circle while they increase the fish supply in the zoo's new automatic feeder (since they were only getting one fish per meal). But Kowalski tampers with the machine, increasing the fish supply more, causing him to drown in a pile of fish. But since fish are brain food, when Kowalski starts eating them, he begins to regrow his normal brain capacity.
85	37	"Right Hand Man"	Eddie Guzelian	Emmanuel Deligiannis	February 26, 2011	221a	N/A
A new lemur, Clemson, arrives at the zoo to the delight of Julien in having a new subject and the delight of Maurice in having someone else around to cater to Julien's every whim for a change. Mort, however, soon suspects the new arrival of being evil. Sucking up to Julien, Clemson soon replaces Maurice as the king's right-hand man, which Maurice has no qualms about until he and Mort witness Clemson talking to himself at night about becoming the new king. The next day, Clemson attempts to send Julien inside a prepared crate to the dreaded Hoboken Zoo, but his plans are thwarted with the penguins' assistance and Clemson ends up shipped off to Hoboken instead. Special guest star: Larry Miller as Clemson
86	38	"Danger Wears a Cape"	Brandon Sawyer	Emmanuel Deligiannis and Tom Bernardo	March 19, 2011	224a	N/A
After several comic books are discovered inside a backpack, Skipper warns the other penguins of the dangers of the comic fan lifestyle and of the non-clandestine actions the superheroes contained within them execute and proceeds to dispose of the comics to thwart their negative influences. At night, however, the others secretly view the comics and then decide to act as a superhero team (Private as "Steel Penguin," Kowalski as "The Throbbing Cerebellum," and Rico as "Barf Bag"), foiling minor inconveniences throughout the zoo. When the zoo's clock is accidentally destroyed in the process, Skipper, at the moment unaware that his teammates were to blame, organizes an investigation. While investigating, the group learns of another caped person having been doing thefts around the zoo, which later turns out to be Julien, taking on the role of a villain ("The Masked Booty", his mask on his booty) after finding the disposed comic books himself. Skipper comically fights him as the superhero "Slappy Hurt-Punch" and Julien retires as a villain. Guest star: Atticus Shaffer as The Vesuvius Twins
87	39	"Operation: Break-speare"	Jess Winfield	Sean Kreiner	March 19, 2011	224b	N/A
Nights-long partying by the lemurs prevents the penguins from getting a proper night's sleep and has caused Skipper to become more paranoid than ever. Meanwhile, unbeknownst to the others, Private repeatedly attends plays of William Shakespeare's works in the park and later quotes from them at random moments, including during "Disturbing the Peace Treaty" talks, at which the penguins and the lemurs attempt to work out their differences. Suffering from sleep deprivation, Skipper soon sees Private's archaic language usage as enemy code, orders his detention, and proceeds to investigate the "enemy encampment" in the park with the others. Eventually, Skipper's sleep deprivation ends when he sleeps through a play the others, including the lemurs, watch.
88	40	"Rat Fink"	Brandon Sawyer	Sunil Hall	March 19, 2011	220b	N/A
After intercepting a rat conversation, the penguins disguise Mort as a sewer rat to go undercover and investigate. There, he finds the rats were just choosing carpets for their sewer. But Mort accidentally blows his cover and gets caught. Skipper and Julien then go down to find him, but end up getting captured as well. They then find out that Mort is being hailed as the rat's new king, the 'Great One', because of the red birthmark on his tail. Mort then plans to lead an invasion on the zoo. After escaping their cell, Skipper and Julien retreat to the surface where they find the rats hugging and kissing the zoo animals. Mort then reveals that his birthmark is really just strawberry jelly he keeps as a snack. The zoo animals then turn on the rats, causing them to retreat back into the sewer. Skipper then congratulates Mort by making him an honorary penguin (like Julien in "Dr. Blowhole's Revenge"). Guest star: Diedrich Bader as The Rat King
89	41	"Kanga Management"	Kurt Weldon	Fred Osmond	March 19, 2011	220a	N/A
When the penguins accidentally destroy Leonard's habitat during a game of hot potato, Alice decides to put Leonard in the kangaroo pen. At first Joey is pleased with having a roommate, but soon starts to get annoyed with Leonard's nocturnal antics (sleeping all day and keeping him awake all night). Joey then becomes enraged when Leonard accidentally bursts his bouncy ball. The penguins then rescue Leonard, which sets off a wild chase into the sewers. Leonard then begins to insult Joey, which angers him even more. After taking out the penguins and finally cornering Leonard, he confesses that if the penguins hadn't destroyed his habitat they wouldn't be in this mess. Joey somehow understands that, and the two become friends due to them both having a certain hatred towards the penguins. Guest stars: Dana Snyder as Leonard and Fred Tatasciore as Gus
90	42	"King Julien for a Day"	Derek Iversen and Eddie Guzelian	Tom Bernardo, Luke Cormican and Fred Osmond	March 26, 2011	222b	N/A
When Skipper and Julien bicker about each other's unfitness at a zoovenir shop meeting, Mason introduces a motion that the two change places for a day to gain better mutual understanding. Skipper then becomes the temporary king of the lemurs while Julien commands the penguins, with each expecting the other to fail in their new role. Later, after Marlene desires cotton candy from a vendor she had spotted, both Skipper and Julien lead their respective new teams out to procure some, only for both to be forced to work together when the cotton candy cart rolls out of control. While they both praise each other's actions immediately thereafter, the two revert to bickering at the next meeting.
91	43	"Maurice at Peace"	Thomas Hart	Sunil Hall	March 26, 2011	223b	N/A
When the chimps receive a fax message saying that Maurice is suffering from a disease called 'Ophuolosaiga', and only has 24 hours left to live, the zoo animals agree to make Maurice's last day the best he's ever had. Maurice is treated like a king but can't understand why, while the penguins look for a cure for the disease. Maurice then starts to get fed up of being treated nicely. Meanwhile, the penguins find an orchid which could be a cure, but every attempt to get into the flower shop fails. The penguins then demolish the flower shop and retrieve the orchid. Back at the zoo, the penguins find Maurice sleeping, but presume him to be dead. However, in the end it's revealed that the message was just a junk fax to another Maurice, a zookeeper, and the 'Ophuolosaiga' was really a holiday destination. Julien, furious from catering Maurice's every need, proceeds to chase him away, throwing walnuts at him.
92	44	"Cute-astrophe"	Brandon Sawyer	Sean Kreiner	April 2, 2011	222a	3.8
After zoo visitors are not impressed enough with the penguins' display of cuteness to toss them fish, Kowalski uses a machine to gauge the cuteness levels of Rico and Private. When intentionally posed in a certain fashion, Private registers at 132 percent, a level capable of knocking out the others. The team later begins to use Private's cuteness-knockout skill to their advantage, but Private later refuses to employ it after many bad and abusive usages ordered by Skipper, aware that what they’re doing is wrong. When the penguins are caught outside their habitat and caged, still Private resists using his cuteness as a weapon to help them escape, even when the team is scheduled to be shipped to Copenhagen, Denmark, where Skipper fears returning. Still being pressured, Private tries to flee and the others chase after him, with all four moving their cages about like hamster balls, which zoo visitors find cute. In response to the visitors' protests, Alice lets the penguins stay in New York. Having learned their lesson, the team finally agree to respect Private's wishes and stop misusing his cuteness.
93	45	"Operation: Neighbor Swap"	Bill Motz & Bob Roth	Fred Osmond	June 13, 2011	225a	N/A
Annoyed by the lemurs' loud music, the penguins arrange to relocate them to the adjacent petting zoo and move Roger to the lemur habitat. While Julien and Maurice soon take to the new habitat well, Mort, angry that Julien is allowing a trio of fluffy bunnies to touch his feet, dislikes the relocation. Meanwhile, Roger begins to get in the penguins' way, and the team begins to regret their relocation operation. Eventually, the lemurs are returned to their original habitat after Julien climbs about the Vesuvius twins, believing them to be bringing him snacks. Special guest stars: Kristen Schaal as The Bunnies, Will Friedle as Randy and Atticus Shaffer as The Vesuvius Twins
94	46	"All Tied Up With a Boa"	Brandon Sawyer	Emmanuel Deligiannis	June 14, 2011	226b	N/A
After learning of Savio's escape from Hoboken on a TV news report, the penguins organize an effort to protect the zoo from the vengeful boa after he took out Burt. Skipper is pleasantly surprised when Julien begins talking tough about fighting Savio, and partners with him as the group prepares the zoo for battle. Once Savio arrives, however, he gets past the animals' defenses and it is revealed that Julien had confused Savio with Fred. Savio soon cages the group, less Julien who runs off, and plans to consume them one by one so that the others will have to watch their friends be eaten. Savio is defeated, however, when Julien accidentally spills some butter flavoring, allowing him to slip from Savio's clutches, rendering the snake too slippery to move as he wishes, and allowing the others to slip through the cage's bars. Savio is sent back to the Hoboken Zoo and Burt readies himself for Savio, although he was too late. Special guest star: Nestor Carbonell as Savio
95	47	"Rock-a-Bye Birdie"	Gabriel Garza	Sunil Hall	June 15, 2011	226a	N/A
When Kowalski's ray designed to freshen spoiled food accidentally hits Skipper before falling down a storm drain, the leader is turned into a baby penguin, albeit retaining much of adult Skipper's personality. While the other penguins attempt to retrieve the ray, the down-feathered Skipper is baby-sat by Julien, under the story that he is "Petey", the penguins' cousin, much to Skipper's displeasure. After the other penguins find that the ray is in the possession of the sewer rats, they are captured by them. Sensing his team is in danger, baby Skipper slips past a sleeping Julien and enters the sewers, ultimately defeating the Rat King through quick-thinking leadership – and a flatulent emission. With the ray back in Kowalski's possession, he returns Skipper to his normal self at the HQ.
96	48	"Herring Impaired"	Brandon Sawyer	Wolf-Rüdiger Bloss	June 16, 2011	225b	N/A
While building a ship in a bottle, the penguins learn from Phil and Mason that their model is of a Norwegian fishing vessel which sunk 100 years ago in the New York Bay with a catch of brined herring. The team then sets off to locate the actual wreck via submarine and succeeds in yielding a crate of century-old fish, which Skipper, Kowalski, and Private rapidly consume the contents of as Rico struggles and fails to get to eat some himself. Unfortunately for the three fish-eaters, the herring induces a 24-hour fish-craving psychotic state, which threatens to become permanent if any further fish is consumed before the condition wears off. Rico then works to prevent his teammates from eating any more fish. After preventing them from robbing a delivery truck, Rico gets the penguins to eat a fish-shaped restaurant sign, which takes them all night to chomp through. Rico is then rewarded with a smoked Alaskan salmon by his team back home.
97	49	"A Visit from Uncle Nigel"	Bill Motz & Bob Roth	Wolf-Rüdiger Bloss	June 17, 2011	223a	N/A
When Private's Uncle Nigel visits the penguins, he quickly becomes a bore to all but his nephew. However, once they are alone, Nigel confides in Private that he is actually a spy targeting the Red Squirrel. The two soon head into Central Park to hunt for the villain, though Private does not believe he exists. However, Red soon appears; Nigel fights him and Private disarms his plant life-destroying missile before Red escapes. Later, at the HQ, the other penguins do not believe it when Private tells of taking on Red, and Nigel denies any confrontation took place. Soon, however, all of the other penguins but Private are taken captive by Red. It is then up to Private to release them, which he accomplishes after blinding Red with the light from a Lunacorn toy prior to Red slipping away again. Special guest star: Peter Capaldi as Uncle Nigel
98	50	"The Hoboken Surprise" "Hoboken Surprise"	Brandon Sawyer	Sunil Hall and Emmanuel Deligiannis	August 20, 2011	229	3.8
The penguins set off on a sailing trip to the Massachusetts coast, but poor weather abruptly tosses them onto the streets of Hoboken. There, the team is quickly noticed by humans, boxed, and brought to the feared Hoboken Zoo. But the sight that greets them there is not the wasteland they had expected; instead, the zoo is pristine. Soon, the team is greeted by friends and enemies Lulu, Hans, Savio, Clemson, and Rhonda who cheerfully welcome the penguins to Hoboken and tell them about Frances, a new zookeeper who has made their lives enjoyable, including by letting them use massage chairs. When Frances meets the penguins, she is equally as cheerful, though Skipper maintains that she is a "dark mastermind," even as his teammates begin to take a liking to Hoboken. The truth is finally revealed, however, when Frances puts Skipper down a chute into the ground, where he meets his teammates and the real Hoboken Zoo animals. Kowalski then explains that Frances had used the massage chairs to copy each animal into an android so as to have a clean zoo and be free of its "dirty" animals. Soon after, the real animals and the androids confront each other as a press conference to honor Frances' work is held by the parks commissioner. Shortly after the resulting damaged android of Skipper lands in his hands, he fires Frances, and the animal-android battle continues as the episode ends. Special guest star: Megan Hilty as Frances Alberta, Jane Leeves as Lulu, Kathy Kinney as Rhonda, Larry Miller as Clemson and Nestor Carbonell as Savio Note: This is a half-hour episode. Nickelodeon promoted it as "Operation: Vacation" in advertisements. This won an Emmy Award for Outstanding Original Song - Children's and Animation for song "In the Happy Little Land of Hoboken Surprise".
99	51	"The Return of the Revenge of Dr. Blowhole"	Bob Schooley & Mark McCorkle	Fred Osmond, Matt Engstrom, Tom Bernardo and Sean Kreiner	September 9, 2011	234-235	N/A
Alone on a secret mission in Shanghai, Skipper walks into a trap set by Hans and Dr. Blowhole which results in Skipper's memories being taken from him by Blowhole's "mind jacker" device before he falls into the ocean. Blowhole plans to use the mind-jacked information to aid in assaulting the penguins' HQ. Later, Skipper washes up on an island, confused about where he is and how he got there. To aid in helping him regain his memory, Skipper's mind hallucinates a "spirit guide" for him to follow in the form of Alex, a lion who had once been a Central Park Zoo neighbor. With "Alex" accompanying him, Skipper sets out to return to New York. Meanwhile, Blowhole has unveiled his Diaboligizer invention to his lobster minion Red One, a device which transforms those hit by its ray into evil creatures of destruction. Blowhole plans to use the Diaboligizer on Kowalski, Rico, and Private, and heads to Manhattan to carry out his plan. He enters the penguins' HQ at the same time Julien and Mort are attempting to pilfer Kowalski's experimental power cell, which Julien wishes to use to replace the dead battery in his MP3 player. With the power cell inside, the Diaboligizer's ray hits it instead of the penguins, resulting in the device increasing in size, floating in the air, and creating an energy bubble which causes the whole zoo to speak only through song. Blowhole manages to exploit this development by singing to tame the mutant MP3 player in order to take control of it and then leaves the zoo with it to unleash his wrath against the city. Skipper then returns and the penguins and lemurs then set out to stop Blowhole, which is accomplished when Skipper's singing serves as a distraction so that the power cell can be removed from the MP3 player. Skipper then activates Blowhole's mind jacker on him and Blowhole returns to Coney Island to perform as "Flippy". Back at the zoo, Skipper thanks "Alex" for being a helpful "spirit guide" and helped him to get back to the zoo. After this, Skipper and "Alex" give some high-fives to each other before "Alex" disappears as the camera fades to black. Special guest stars: Neil Patrick Harris as Dr. Blowhole and Wally Wingert as Alex the Lion. Note: This episode is the series' first one-hour TV episode. This won an Emmy Award for Outstanding Animated Program.
100	52	"Pets Peeved" "Pet's Peeved"	Brandon Sawyer	Fred Osmond	September 24, 2011	230a	N/A
After their family sponsors many of the zoo's habitats, the Vesuvius twins pressure Alice to allow them to take Skipper and Julien home with them to "play". Their version of play involves placing the two through uncomfortable scenarios for their amusement, including trying to make them fight each other, which Skipper refuses to engage in but Julien goes along with because of his fascination with the shiny objects the twins reward him with. When Maurice, Mort, and the other penguins attempt to find Skipper and Julien, all are subjected to the twins' "circus of pain" until everyone manages to free themselves after Maurice convinces Julien that he is merely the twins' pet, Julien's discarded objects giving Skipper the tools he needs to escape, culminating in them giving the twins a taste of their own medicine.
101	53	"Byte-Sized" "Byte - Sized"	Evelyn Gabai	Matt Engstrom	September 24, 2011	230b	N/A
Kowalski unveils his latest invention: "nanites," tiny robots which are capable of operating any mechanical object, thus freeing the penguins of time spent on chores. Skipper initially fears the nanites will become another of Kowalski's disastrous inventions, but changes his mind after Kowalski demonstrates that the nanites are programmed to not allow any harm to come to a penguin. Unfortunately, the programming has the unintended consequence of the nanites becoming overprotective, first by inhibiting the team's rescue of Barry the poison-dart frog when his tongue is caught in the cotton candy machine- although they are able to outmaneuver the nanites and save Barry anyway- and later by containing them in their HQ. The nanites fight back against the penguins' attempts to shut them down by assembling a large robotic form from various pieces of technology around the zoo, but are unstoppable until Kowalski is injured after his attempt to hit the robot with an EMP causes it to fall on top of him, with the nanites then self-terminating because they had violated their penguin non-harm protocol. Special guest stars: Kevin McDonald as Barry
102	54	"Operation: Good Deed"	Bill Motz & Bob Roth	Sean Kreiner	October 8, 2011	219a	3.5
After the penguins witness a boy returning a dropped dollar to a man and calling it his "good deed for the day," Skipper decides that the team will seek to increase the frequency of their own good deeds. After two attempts at assisting zoo visitors, the penguins seek Marlene's assistance and ultimately fulfill their good deed with her by cleaning up the leaves they had inadvertently caused to fall from Marlene's tree. However, their good deed is offset when Rico flings away the leaves inside a bucket and the object accidentally hits Mason, injuring his back. To remedy the new situation, the penguins must first satisfy Julien's request in order to arrange for Maurice to massage Mason, with effectuating Julien's desire creating the need to satisfy numerous other favors for Pinky, Burt, Roy, Bada, and Bing, and later having to speedily deliver the pizzas of a knocked-out delivery boy.
103	55	"When the Chips are Down"	Bill Motz & Bob Roth	Wolf-Rüdiger Bloss	October 8, 2011	219b	3.5
Private and Mort are trapped inside a vending machine after Private tries to help Mort procure a snack. After determining the two to be missing, the other penguins and Maurice begin to search for them; meanwhile, Julien watches an ad on TV in which a wacky professor is peddling plush penguin and mouse lemur toys, and incorrectly believes the man to have Private and Mort in his possession. The five then pursue this professor and then realize their error. Throughout this, Private tries several methods of escaping from the vending machine, only for Mort to foul up each attempt; Private's frustration comes to a heated crescendo after Mort eats all the food. However, when the depleted inventory is noticed by Alice, Private and Mort escape as she restocks the machine.
104	56	"Time Out"	John Behnke	Sunil Hall	October 10, 2011	233a	N/A
Kowalski creates a time-stopping stopwatch, which freezes all but those touching the device. When Julien sees Kowalski holding the stopwatch, he wishes to use it to time how long the flavor of his chewing gum lasts. After Julien gains possession of it and inadvertently stops and then restarts time, Kowalski attempts to get the stopwatch back, but the timepiece ultimately winds up irreparably broken, permanently trapping the two in a moment of time. Though initially frustrated by what Julien had caused, Kowalski soon uses the sudden eternity to partake in buddy activities with Julien and create 7,009 inventions. But when Julien mentions that he had placed a piece of gum inside the stopwatch to dispose of it earlier when its flavor ran out, Kowalski removes it from the device and the unit becomes operational, easily undoing the time freeze.
105	57	"Our Man in Grrfurjiclestan"	Brandon Sawyer	Emmanuel Deligiannis	October 10, 2011	233b	N/A
The penguins receive a video message from Buck Rockgut informing them that the Red Squirrel had somehow brainwashed one of them into being a sleeper agent, but he accidentally disconnects himself before revealing who it is. As various mishaps soon plague the penguins, they begin to suspect each other of being the forewarned saboteur. To end the madness, Kowalski traces Rockgut's video signal hoping to reestablish communication, finding that it had originated from a Brooklyn baseball stadium. When the team travels there, they find Rockgut, who had faked the whole thing in retaliation for the penguins having sent him on a wild goose chase looking for Red in the nonexistent land of Grrfurjiclestan. However, the Red Squirrel then shows up and it is revealed that Rockgut himself was Red's sleeper. Rockgut is then ordered to take out the penguins with a T-shirt cannon, but the penguins manage to confuse him, by wearing eye patches, into thinking they were also Red Squirrels. The real Red is then captured.
106	58	"Gut Instinct"	Bill Motz & Bob Roth	Fred Osmond	October 10, 2011	236a	N/A
Against Alice's prohibition, a woman named Gladys sneaks various snacks to the zoo animals, as she had done previously. The animals all appreciate her, except for the lemurs, who Gladys believes are cats and are given cat food. When Gladys slips on a mango pit in front of the lemur habitat and hurts her arm, Julien is faulted by the other animals for throwing the pit into her path. They then seek to punish him by allowing Kowalski to use his "Rump-Whomper" device to spank him. All the while, Skipper's gut—literally, through grumbling—keeps telling him that Julien is innocent, and he seeks to clear the lemur of any wrongdoing. In the end, Skipper takes the punishment for Julien after determining through video that he had inadvertently set off a chain of events that led to the pit landing in Gladys' path.
107	59	"I Know Why the Caged Bird Goes Insane"	Brandon Sawyer	Matt Engstrom	October 10, 2011	236b	N/A
Kowalski is ecstatic to learn that the Invexpo science convention has come to Central Park, only to be unable to attend after accidentally pulling a billboard down on himself, which fractures his legs and confines him to the nursery for a 30-day recovery. To liven Kowalski's spirits, Private suggests that he, Skipper, and Rico attend Invexpo instead; Skipper reluctantly agrees, finding the event surprisingly fun. Meanwhile, Kowalski's sanity quickly deteriorates from the boredom of confinement and the inability to attend Invexpo himself. But later, when he notices a space squid landing and the rest of the team unaware, he gets Marlene's attention to assist. After it takes Kowalski's Extend-o-Grab invention because of the hand–finger capabilities space squids lack, the creature returns to the sky after Marlene uses the invention to poke at the invader. Afterward, Kowalski no longer feels upset about not attending Invexpo, as he had "already witnessed the greatest invention this world has to offer"—his own.
108	60	"The Big S.T.A.N.K." "The Big Stank"	Eddie Guzelian	Tom Bernardo	November 26, 2011	231b	N/A
After getting a splinter in his rear from sitting on his throne, Julien wishes to replace it with a new one. Meanwhile, at the penguins' HQ, Rico accidentally brings a long-hidden project, S.T.A.N.K., into view. S.T.A.N.K., a stink bomb-armed toilet once intended to trap Dr. Blowhole, was abandoned after the penguins discovered that dolphins do not use toilets. To now permanently get rid of it, the penguins decide to transport it to a highway rest stop. But Julien, desiring it for his new throne, pursues with Maurice and Mort and subsequently gets himself strapped to the S.T.A.N.K. upon sitting on it. With the S.T.A.N.K.'s core approaching meltdown, Kowalski and Maurice return to the zoo to try to figure out how to safely free Julien without the bomb detonating. It is ultimately determined that sodium chloride will short out the lock on the restraints, and that tears would be an effective solution. After Julien is unable to cry on command, Skipper thinks of all the time he had wasted with Julien and sheds a single tear, unlocking the restraints just before the S.T.A.N.K. explodes.
109	61	"Arch-Enemy" "Arch Enemy"	Bill Motz & Bob Roth	Sunil Hall	November 26, 2011	231a	N/A
Following the fourth failure of Kowalski's "Nextoskeleton" invention in many months, Private spots something more horrific than Kowalski's crash: an unflattering doodle of himself on a nearby wall. Private then asks the snail that drew it why he had done so, and learns that the snail, Dale, hates him for having stepped on him the previous spring in the park. Private has no memory of the incident, but wishes to make things right; his efforts result in accidentally crushing Dale twice more, causing the other animals to believe that Private is a monster. King Julian tries to help Private, but ends up making things even worse for him. Later, Dale gains access to Kowalski's Nextoskeleton and wishes to exact poetic justice: to step on Private the same way he had been stepped on with the suit, leading to a battle between the penguins and Dale. But when Private points out that the suit belonged to Kowalski and that it was he who stepped on Dale, not Private, Dale realizes his mistake and apologizes to Private for the misunderstanding, agreeing to tell the others that Private is not a monster, but after he takes his revenge on Kowalski. Special guest star: Lewis Black as Dale
110	62	"Operation: Antarctica"	Brandon Sawyer	Sunil Hall, Emmanuel Deligiannis and Tom Bernardo	January 16, 2012	237	N/A
Hunter, a young leopard seal pup, is accidentally brought to New York inside the fishing nets of Antarctic poachers Cecil and Brick. Though fearful of her at first, after he rescues Hunter from a fish-processing hopper, Private asks the other penguins to help return her to Antarctica. Though Hunter presents herself as a non-penguin-eating "fishetarian," the others fear her predatory instincts and decide to help her only as far as launching her from the HQ into the East River with the instruction "go south". Not wanting Hunter to have to travel to Antarctica alone, Private launches with her, forcing the others to have to follow by submarine. In Antarctica, a group of leopard seals led by Hunter's father wishes to eat Private, but he is quickly declared off limits after Hunter tells of Private saving her. The other three penguins, however, are slated to become a meal. Hunter and Private try to explain that seals and penguins need not be predator and prey, but the message is lost when Hunter shows off a friend move she and Private had done together involving shaking Private in her mouth, which is misinterpreted as a hunting technique. After feeling sad that she is not understood, Hunter, along with Private and Julien, who had been a submarine stowaway, free the other penguins, though the hungry seals pursue. But when Private saves Hunter's father from falling off a ledge in the process, he accepts that natural instincts are not everything. Note: This episode was a half-hour special Special guest stars: Ciara Bravo as Hunter and Ed O'Neill as her father
111	63	"The Big Move"	Thomas Hart	Tom Bernardo and Carson Kugler	January 16, 2012	239a	N/A
After the lemurs enjoy a night out in the park that had also given the penguins a better night's sleep, Skipper decides to help the lemurs continue to slip into the park via a secret tunnel, though the other penguins express concern. Julien is instructed to keep quiet about the arrangement, but soon spreads the word anyway, resulting in many of the zoo's animals venturing into the park at night. Skipper believes everything will be OK when the penguins discover this, only for Burt to complicate matters when he jackknifes himself inside the tunnel once morning comes, creating a traffic jam of sorts for the AWOL animals. While Kowalski tries in vain to free Burt, the other penguins attempt to delay Alice and the visiting Commissioner McSlade from discovering the absences. Ultimately, Julien unintentionally frees Burt when he opens a water main, believing it is a "smoothie pipeline," which blasts the animals back into their respective habitats.
112	64	"Endangerous Species"	Gabriel Garza	Sean Kreiner	January 16, 2012	239b	N/A
The penguins wish to bring an extinct Waitaha penguin back to life, but end up cloning a dodo instead due to Skipper's grabbing of the wrong feather from the museum during a hasty retreat. The cloned bird, Dode, after introducing himself as a daredevil, manages to subsequently blow himself up with Rico's flamethrower just as the penguins begin to discuss how to help him. Dode is then cloned repetitively, only to manage to get himself killed through various reckless actions each time, which Kowalski attributes to dodo DNA having evolved to lack fear genes through centuries of having no natural predators. The penguins then insist that their next Dode wear safety gear, and chase after him when he refuses. In the process, Kowalski's cloning machine is accidentally tipped over, cloning untold numbers of dodos before exploding and losing its life-giving Higgs boson particle, making future cloning impossible. These final Dodes then recklessly kill themselves, except for one which the penguins manage to save by daring him into having a staring contest with a taxidermied dodo at the museum, which he begins doing for perpetuity. Special guest star: Brian Stepanek as Dode
113	65	"Loathe at First Sight"	Justin Charlebois	Fred Osmond	February 11, 2012	227a	N/A
In an effort to make Doris the dolphin wish to be more than just friends with him, Kowalski invents the "Love-u-Laser," a device designed to render the subject of a laser blast in love with a pre-selected target. But after proving its capabilities on few zoo subjects, Kowalski is ordered by Skipper to reverse the actions. But in the process of doing so, the Love-u-Laser jams and then fires unexpectedly at Private, who within moments angrily tackles and yells at Kowalski. Kowalski believes that Private's state can be reversed, but after procuring the necessary compound for the Love-u-Laser, it once again malfunctions, casting its beam of hatred across the zoo and resulting in Kowalski being violently loathed by everyone else. As they surround him wishing to do him harm, the Love-u-Laser's effects are finally reversed when it falls into the fountain and causes a loathe-reversing beam to be cast across the zoo. In the end, a disheartened Kowalski destroys the Love-u-Laser, but Private enlightens him with the fact that maybe he and Doris will get together one day.
114	66	"The Trouble With Jiggles"	John Behnke & Rob Humphrey	Sean Kreiner	February 11, 2012	227b	N/A
Kowalski is court-martialed for having intentionally failed to destroy his gelatinous "Jiggles" creation. Through flashbacks beginning when Skipper discovered that Kowalski still possessed Jiggles, it is shown that Kowalski believed Jiggles could now be safely kept because he had altered it to consume whipped cream instead of fruit. Skipper, however, still believing that Jiggles is dangerous, attempts to smash it with a baseball bat, only for Jiggles to unexpectedly subdivide from the impact. The situation is exacerbated when Skipper continues to hit the resultant "Jiggli," producing more and more with each blow, and when the cubes escape the HQ, they multiply more as the zoo animals impact them without realizing the consequences. A plan by Rico to lure the Jiggli with a mound of whipped cream and then blow them up instead results in Jiggli raining from the sky. At the end of the court-martial, Rico attempts to pour some whipped cream onto a pie, only to attract the Jiggli into the HQ, where they are eventually neutralized by Kowalski's idea to lower the temperature of the HQ to freeze them. The frozen cubes are then loaded onto a rocket which lands on Mars, where the revived Jiggli then attack a group of space squids.
115	67	"Alienated"	Bill Motz & Bob Roth	Sunil Hall and Robert Lence	March 31, 2012	217a	N/A
"Lemmy" the life-emulating robot returns to the zoo from Mars with an unwelcome visitor: a space squid which bursts out of his chest compartment, damaging him. After the squid immobilizes Mort with a phlegm-like substance, the penguins, lemurs, and Lemmy's head begin to hunt it down in order to protect the zoo and ultimately the planet from further invasion. Now larger in size, the space squid soon renders each penguin and lemur immobile. The alien is ultimately defeated by Lemmy, once his body had reconfigured itself through an automated process, using a combination of dance and fighting moves under the verbal direction of Julien and Skipper.
116	68	"The Most Dangerous Game Night"	Brandon Sawyer	Emmanuel Deligiannis and Brian Hatfield	March 31, 2012	232a	N/A
Marlene plans a zoowide game night, hoping that it will bring the animals closer together. Skipper, however, questions if Marlene can handle a game night and warns that her idea could turn on her. As the other animals partake in game night, Skipper observes to ensure that everything remains orderly, and stays behind when Maurice, Mort, and Kowalski leave the zoo to procure more party mix from a local snack store after Julien eats all of it. While they are gone, Skipper's earlier fears begin to come true as the animals begin to not get along with each other due to the games. Meanwhile, a silent alarm is set off at the snack store, summoning the police and trapping Maurice, Mort, and Kowalski inside. When the zoo animals learn of the three being trapped on TV, Skipper seeks Marlene's help to rescue them by organizing the animals to improvise various games on the street to take down and distract the police. The plan succeeds, as does Marlene's original goal of bringing the zoo together.

== DVD releases ==
The Penguins of Madagascar home video releases
Season	Episodes	Years active	Release dates
Season	Episodes	Years active	Region 1
2	68	2010–12	Operation: DVD Premiere: February 9, 2010; Episode(s): "Command Crisis" • "Truth Ache" Happy King Julien Day!: August 10, 2010; Episode(s): "The Helmet" New to the Zoo: August 10, 2010; Episode(s): "The Red Squirrel" • "In the Line of Doody" • "The Big Squeeze" I Was a Penguin Zombie: October 5, 2010; Episode(s): "It's About Time" • "Driven to the Brink" All-Nighter Before Xmas: October 11, 2011; Episode(s): "The Lost Treasure of the Golden Squirrel" • "Wishful Thinking" • "The All Nighter Before Christmas" • "The Hoboken Surprise" • "Operation: Good Deed" Operation: Blowhole: January 10, 2012; Episode(s): "The Return of the Revenge of Dr. Blowhole" Operation: Get Ducky: February 14, 2012; Episode(s): "Hard Boiled Eggy" • "April Fools" • "Operation: Neighbor Swap" Operation: Antarctica: October 30, 2012; Episode(s): "Concrete Jungle Survival" • "Work Order" • "Operation: Antarctica" Operation: Special Delivery: November 4, 2014; Episode(s): "Mr. Tux" • "Hello, Dollface" • "Hot Ice" • "The All Nighter Before Christmas" • "A Visit from Uncle Nigel" • "The Big Move"
