= The Penguins of Madagascar season 3 =

The Penguins of Madagascar
- Season 3
- No. of episodes: 33

Release
- Original network: Nickelodeon (2012); Nicktoons (2015–16)
- Original release: April 16, 2012 – January 4, 2016

Season chronology
- ← Previous; Season 2

This is a list of episodes for the third and final season of DreamWorks Animation's animated television series, The Penguins of Madagascar. It began airing on Nickelodeon in the United States on April 16, 2012. Premieres were moved to Nicktoons from February 14, 2015, to January 4, 2016.

== Episodes ==
No. overall	No. in season	Title	Written by	Original release date	Prod. code	US viewers (millions)
Nickelodeon
117	1	"Feline Fervor"	Written by : Justin Charlebois; Storyboarded by : Jean-Sebastien Duclos; Tom Bernardo (additional)	April 16, 2012	304a	3.3
Accidentally bounced out of the zoo from his bounce house, Julien is carried away by a bus he lands on top of. After jumping off, he is soon picked off the street by a woman named Gladys, who thinks he is a cat and brings him to her home. As the penguins, Maurice, and Mort begin a rescue mission, Julien is introduced to Gladys' other "cat," a ferret named Zoe who plays to Gladys' misconception in order to receive free meals and avoid returning to life on the streets. Though she shows no interest in him, Julien repetitively seeks Zoe's affection, which only serves to annoy her to the point of rigging a scratching post to eject Julien out the window. She winds up accidentally ejecting herself while demonstrating scratching post use to Julien, but is casually rescued as the penguins, Maurice, and Mort arrive. Julien then tells them that he is now domesticated and wishes to remain with his love, but Private convinces Julien to return to the zoo lest Mort take over as king. Guest voices: Ashley Bell as Zoe & Rolanda Watts as Gladys
118	2	"King Me"	Written by : Gabriel Garza; Storyboarded by : Fred Osmond	April 17, 2012	307a	N/A
Clemson arrives to inform Julien that he cannot have inherited the crown because he was born outside of Madagascar, and plans to take over as king himself. Lemur law, however, would still allow Julien to earn kingship by winning a competition, but he is too distraught to be much of a competitor. So to help Julien win, Kowalski uses his mind-switching machine to switch Julien's and Rico's minds to allow Rico to compete for the lemur. The plan succeeds for the first round of competition, but after Clemson discovers what the penguins had done, he makes it so that subsequent rounds are disadvantageous to the other penguins when they switch minds with Julien. But during Clemson's coronation after he wins the competition, Kowalski switches Julien's and Clemson's minds and Julien, in Clemson's body, decrees "Julien" king before the two are then switched back. While doing that, "Clemson" insults the gorillas and they angrily chase the real Clemson back to Hoboken. Guest voices: Larry Miller as Clemson
119	3	"The Otter Woman"	Written by : Kim Duran; Storyboarded by : Wolf-Rüdiger Bloss	April 18, 2012	217b	N/A
Distracted, Alice places too many chlorine tablets into Marlene's pond, which bleaches Marlene's fur white following a brief swim. When she goes for assistance, Kowalski incorrectly believes that she is a rare Arctic mink; while grasping her tongue, he also misinterprets her name as "Arlene." Skipper and Julien quickly become infatuated with the "new" zoo resident, failing to listen to her insistence about who she really is and how her appearance changed. Later, after Skipper finds Arlene in Marlene's habitat with the latter unaccounted for, he suddenly suspects Arlene to have done something horrible with Marlene. "Arlene" is then confronted by the penguins and chased around the zoo until she is found by Alice and her natural fur color restored with hair dye. Afterward, as Marlene wonders to the penguins about why they didn't recognize her, Mort is seen with bleached fur, the second victim of over-chlorination.
120	4	"Action Reaction"	Written by : Gabriel Garza; Storyboarded by : Fred Osmond	April 19, 2012	304b	N/A
After the penguins foil Hans' raid on a weapons lab, a tube of Inflatium accidentally spills onto Skipper, causing his body to expand like a balloon whenever he gets angry and risk popping if it expands too much. The other penguins try to keep Skipper relaxed as he attempts to remain somewhat active in the unit, but when they are unable to prevent him from getting angry, they persuade him to work inside the HQ at a desk instead of going out on missions. But when the other three set out when Hans makes another attempt on the weapons lab, they are soon captured and Skipper has no choice but to go after them in his inflated state. His condition winds up protecting him as Hans fires weapons at him with no effect, with Skipper also able to use his body to attack Hans as well. When Julien arrives and inadvertently pins down Hans, however, Hans gloats that Skipper was not the one to defeat him, which angers Skipper to the point of finally popping. But rather than having blown apart, a normal-size Skipper emerges from within his burst outer body. Julien then spills Inflatium on himself, and Skipper rides him back to the zoo.
121	5	"Thumb Drive"	Written by : Bill Motz & Bob Roth; Storyboarded by : Emmanuel Deligiannis	April 20, 2012	305b	2.3
While trying to obtain food for the chameleons, the penguins discover that the zoo's food shed is secured by a newly installed thumbprint-scanning lock. Kowalski believes he can hack the system to allow the lock to accept any thumbprint, and Maurice is temporarily recruited to help the penguins gain access. Feeling useful and happy to be doing something other than serving Julien, Maurice wishes to then continue being with the penguins, and together they plan a future raid on a weapons lab. In the meantime, Maurice participates in various thumb-related activities with the penguins while Julien struggles in his kingdom without Maurice there to help him. When the night of the raid arrives, Julien and Mort sneak along and Julien, in effort to show Maurice how dangerous penguin missions can be, triggers the lab's alarm by placing his rear on the thumbprint scanner. The facility locks down and lasers begin firing at the intruders until Maurice uses a remote-controlled tank to destroy them. He then agrees to return home.
122	6	"Operation: Big Blue Marble"	Written by : Bill Motz & Bob Roth; Storyboarded by : Tom Bernardo and Sean Kreiner	April 22, 2012	303	3.3
Kowalski invents a machine which combines fish and churros together to form a new food, the "furro." The process, however, produces a toxic byproduct, which is released in the form of blue bubbles through the vent of the lemurs' plastic volcano. Over the course of several days, the bubbles collect into an ever-increasing ball above the earth, and it begins to alter the weather inside the zoo and the Central Park area, with variable conditions occurring concurrently or in quick succession. Based on Private's observations after being sent into the atmosphere to investigate and a TV weather report, Kowalski concludes that the weather conditions are a result of the furro-creating machine's use and says that it should no longer be used. Skipper, however, does not believe Kowalski's conclusion and remains at the HQ while the others set off inside airplanes to destroy the bubble. When the mission runs afoul, however, Skipper suddenly appears to save them inside the penguins' rocket, only for them all to soon be shot into the bubble when Julien, who is there alongside Maurice and Mort, presses a button. Trapped inside without fuel, Skipper states that he now believes Kowalski's theory. All are then saved after the lemurs eat furros and their burp gasses are collected to be used as a fuel source, with the ignited rocket also causing the bubble to explode in the process. Note: This episode is a half-hour special & the only one not to include guest voices.
123	7	"Hair Apparent"	Written by : Jim Peronto; Storyboarded by : Wolf-Rüdiger Bloss	May 6, 2012	228a	2.9
After the penguins' fake starvation, Commissioner McSlade instructs Alice to increase the penguins' fish rations and says that he will secure the money for the increase during his upcoming lunch with the mayor. McSlade's toupee then blows off without his knowledge and Alice begins repetitively trying to inform him of such discreetly and indirectly. The hairpiece ends up in the lemur habitat where Julien, believing it is a hairy creature, commands Maurice to beat it; in the process, a sticky fruit adheres it to Maurice's head. Julien and Mort then begin to attack the "monster" with sticks as Maurice flees; Maurice's rear is covered in red paint and some of his tail fur ripped off in the chase until it reaches the baboon habitat and the three female baboons mistake Maurice for a male of their species. The baboons begin to pamper him, which makes Julien jealous. Meanwhile, after searching for the toupee, when the penguins learn its whereabouts from Julien, they rip it from Maurice in time to place it back on the commissioner's head before he leaves the zoo. Guest voices: Grey DeLisle as the baboons
124	8	"Love Takes Flightless"	Written by : Bill Motz & Bob Roth; Storyboarded by : Tom Bernardo	May 6, 2012	228b	2.9
After Shelly the ostrich gets her head stuck in drying cement, Rico frees her by breaking the cement apart with dynamite. She immediately becomes smitten with him and, after Marlene advises her, seeks to win his affection by building a chewing gum sculpture of him and singing him a song. Her actions are only seen as awkward, however, and she soon learns by overhearing Skipper and Marlene conversing that Rico is instead in love with a plastic doll. To eliminate the competition for Rico's heart, Shelly disposes of Miss Perky in a recycling dumpster and continues to try to get Rico to notice her, but Rico focuses only on trying to find his missing doll. She then sees that Rico is happy and confesses to taking the doll, and helps the penguins recover it from the recycling truck after the dumpster is emptied. Shelly then procures her own doll partner from a toy store, which Rico sees as crazy. Guest voices: Melissa McCarthy as Shelly
125	9	"Smotherly Love"	Written by : Michael Ludy; Storyboarded by : Jeremy Bernstein and Fred Osmond	May 13, 2012	301b	2.9
After Hans attempts to blast the penguins with a defective freeze ray, Rico launches a missile at him which takes out a possum's tree home by accident. The possum faints, as if in fright, and is taken by the penguins back to the HQ to be revived. There, after suddenly regaining consciousness, the possum introduces herself as "Ma" and begins to treat the penguins in a loving, motherly manner, which Skipper initially fears will turn his team soft before allowing it after Ma has another episode. Later, while hunting for Hans, the penguins learn from Marlene that whenever Ma seemed like she was dying, she was actually "playing possum." After Skipper confronts Ma and sends her away, Hans captures her. Hans successfully freezes the penguins as they attempt to free Ma, but Ma is then able to play on Hans' sympathies by playing possum on him and then grabbing his freeze ray to unfreeze the penguins. Skipper then says that Ma is free to mollycoddle his team further, but she leaves to instead show Hans "tough love": making him eat his peas lest she "die" on him. Guest voices: Julie White as Ma
126	10	"Littlefoot"	Written by : Mark Palmer; Storyboarded by : Tom Bernardo, Matt Engstrom and Fred Osmond	May 13, 2012	301a	2.9
Marlene comes to the penguins sad that her inability to leave the zoo without going wild will prevent her from seeing Enrico Guitaro's performance in the park. But after Kowalski uses his Persona Disentanglizer on her, Marlene's violent impulses are removed from the rest of her, which allows her to then leave the zoo without going wild. However, being apart from her other side renders Marlene excessively afraid, and when she and the penguins leave the concert soon after arrival, they discover that the other half of Marlene had escaped from the Persona Disentanglizer after taking physical form and is now terrorizing the city. As the penguins set out to find what the news has dubbed "Littlefoot," Officer X believes that capturing the creature will get him his job back and manages to capture it as the penguins observe. He is subsequently rehired. When nervous Marlene is brought to the animal control facility so that Kowalski can rejoin her with her violent half, Littlefoot does not attack Marlene and is instead befuddled by her. X then loses his job again when Rico waddles out just as Littlefoot was to be shown on TV. On the way back to the zoo, Skipper then suggests to Marlene, who is not turning feral, that the whole Littlefoot situation was a ruse to convince Marlene that she had the power to control herself all along. Guest voices: Dot-Marie Jones as Supervisor Eubanks
127	11	"Antics on Ice"	Written by : Bill Motz & Bob Roth; Storyboarded by : Sean Kreiner	May 20, 2012	306a	2.6
After a painful afternoon of missions, the other penguins agree to take Private to see Lunacorns on Ice to cheer him up. Skipper also agrees to let Private bring his fellow Lunacorn fans along, agreeing before learning that the fellow fans are Roy and Bing. With the difficulty of getting the large mammals to the show, Kowalski recommends scrubbing the mission, but Skipper is determined to keep his promise for fear that disappointing Private would lead him to evolve into a hipster. After the six manage to get to the arena, Roy and Bing are seen outside by a stagehand who believes they are part of the show and pushes them inside before the penguins enter themselves. On ice, Roy and Bing unintentionally get in the way of the Lunacorn actors while interacting with their heroes, which entertains the audience but irritates the director until Skipper and Rico are able to contain the chaos. Roy and Bing are later added to The Lunacorns TV show, which disappoints Private because a penguin character was not added.
128	12	"Showdown on Fairway 18"	Written by : Gabriel Garza; Storyboarded by : Tom Bernardo and Kenji Ono	May 20, 2012	306b	2.6
The Amarillo Kid returns to the zoo seeking help after losing his shell in a mini golf game to a pair of gophers, who are now after it. Feeling the Amarillo Kid did nothing wrong this time, Private wishes to help, but the other penguins see the situation as a way to rid themselves of an enemy. Private later meets up with the Amarillo Kid, who tells him about a legendary putter which he wishes to borrow from a nearby country club to use in another game against the gophers because it renders its wielder unbeatable. As Private and the Amarillo Kid attempt to retrieve the putter, the gophers arrive at the zoo and inform the other penguins that they are not after the Amarillo Kid's shell, but rather that he swindled them by making them bet and lose their valuables. Meanwhile, after obtaining the putter, the Amarillo Kid admits to Private that he is actually stealing the putter for the gophers instead of borrowing it, as it was the only way he could save his shell. The gophers and other penguins then arrive at the country club, where the gophers trap the penguins and run off with the putter. After they are freed by the Amarillo Kid, all five chase after the gophers. The Amarillo Kid is able to get the putter back, but has to be reminded to give it back himself after nearly walking off with it. Guest voices: Jim Cummings as Gomer & Bo
129	13	"Street Smarts"	Written by : James W. Bates; Storyboarded by : Sean Kreiner	May 27, 2012	232b	2.5
When a stray dog in the park mistakes the lemurs for cats and chases after them, Julien throws Mort at him so he and Maurice can escape. Julien then seeks to have Private become the replacement "cute guy" in his kingdom while the other penguins set out to rescue Mort. The penguins quickly locate Mort and the dog, with Mort in no danger and playing with the dog, Elmer, instead. Elmer explains that he had thought Mort was a cat, but now believes him to be more or less of a toy, which he refers to as "Squeaky." He and Mort wish to play with each other again and arrange a playdate for the following day, but Elmer then refuses to give Mort up and runs off with him. When the penguins happen upon Max, he helps them with dog-locating techniques and later distracts Elmer while the penguins rescue Mort from a dumpster and again so they can manage an escape. The penguins then presume "Moon Cat" to be dead, but later discover that he and Elmer became friends, Elmer believing Max to be a lemur. Guest voices: Patrick Warburton as Elmer
130	14	"Nighty Night Ninja"	Written by : Ivory Floyd; Storyboarded by : Tom Bernardo	May 27, 2012	238a	2.5
While he waits for his habitat to air out after the penguins accidentally bomb it with stinking fish, Leonard, the koala, watches an all-night ninja movie marathon with the penguins. Although he initially dislikes the films, he craves more action when morning comes at the end of the marathon. When he then goes back to his habitat to sleep, he begins to execute martial arts moves against unsuspecting zoo animals while in a sleepwalk-like state. After Burt knocks him into the sewer, Leonard uses his moves to fight the Rat King before the penguins manage to subdue the koala and bring him back to the HQ to attempt to undo his ninja impulses by forcing him to watch eight hours of The Lunacorns. When the Rat King then seeks revenge against Leonard, Leonard ultimately defeats him again, only this time by freaking him out with love and hugs.
131	15	"A Kipper for Skipper"	Written by : Steve Aranguren; Storyboarded by : Sunil Hall	June 3, 2012	302a	2.5
After the other penguins complain about the strenuous tasks they are made to perform as part of Skipper's annual Teambuilding Week, Skipper decides to grant whichever of his teammates brings him a kipper first one day off from teambuilding exercises. Kowalski, Rico, and Private then set off in a race against each other to the fish market and then scramble to be the first to snag a kipper once there. No sooner has Kowalski got his flippers on one, than all three are captured by Officer X, now working as a fishmonger. Crated, the three realize that they were brought down by failing to remain a team. They work together to escape from X's truck and X crashes into a police car and gets in trouble with the law once more. When they return to the zoo, they present the kipper to Skipper together and inform him that they learned their lesson about teamwork, to which Skipper replies that he was not trying to teach them anything and only wanted a kipper.
132	16	"High Moltage"	Written by : Brandon Sawyer; Storyboarded by : Emmanuel Deligiannis	June 3, 2012	302b	2.5
The penguins wanted to see an action movie, but they discovered that Alice had installed an electronic shield around the zoo that will not let zoo animals in or out, but lets humans come and go freely. But that was not their problem, as Private was molting. They tried Kowalski's mind-switcher with Mort and Private, but ended up with Maurice with Julien's mind and Julien with Maurice's mind (but the drainer had been placed on Julien's rump, so his mouth was on his butt). Next they go to Marlene about true beauty and Marlene tells Private that the quantum-hypercute is inside him. Private's quantum-hypercute would not work, but they did scare off the zoo visitors with it, and they managed to seize the card that deactivated the shield. They make it to the film's final show of the opening day, along with all their friends (even the lemurs).
133	17	"Nuts to You"	Written by : Brandon Sawyer; Storyboarded by : Jeremy Bernstein	June 10, 2012	310a	2.3
The penguins have a dogfight in their toy planes. Skipper is victorious, but when Julien starts throwing fruit, Rico crashes into Fred, the mindless squirrel, who subsequently wins an acorn jackpot. King Julien then immediately makes friends with Fred, and they have a party that evening. Oblivious to them, The Red Squirrel is plundering again, and captures Julien and Fred to make them confess about the whereabouts of all those acorns but unable to because they would mistake it as a business proposition. The Penguins come to the rescue, but before they get in, they discover Red installed a ground motion-sensor that destroys any who steps within perhaps 50 feet of his HQ tree. They do manage to get in thanks to Mort, but get captured. In the end, Red is defeated by Julien and Fred's mindlessness, after they trade all the acorns for a few "magic beans".
134	18	"The Terror of Madagascar"	Written by : Gabriel Garza; Storyboarded by : Emmanuel Deligiannis	June 10, 2012	310b	2.3
When a baby fossa arrives at the zoo, everyone likes its new arrival, especially Private. But King Julien refuses to even look, similar to the fossa attack in Madagascar. But when the fossa starts biting Julien's rump, he stars to fear it, until Kowalski states that it was thinking of Julien as a father. But before he stated that, Julien managed to send Savio back to the zoo (when Kowalski stated the other zoo animals (Burt and Julien, with butter), not them, had defeated Savio in previous encounters). He tries to eat the baby fossa, but in the park, Julien stated if he was to eat it, he would have to eat him first. Just before Savio could do that, the baby fossa actually attacks him. Later, Kowalski finds that the baby fossa is on a worldwide zoo tour before returning to Madagascar. Julien, riddled with injuries, wants to hug it, before the baby bites Julien on the head.
135	19	"Mental Hen"	Written by : Brandon Sawyer; Storyboarded by : Jeremy Bernstein and Sunil Hall	June 17, 2012	305a	2.4
After the penguins catch the gorillas acting suspiciously at night and then attempting to grab a chicken, Bada and Bing inform them that the chicken possesses psychic abilities that have so far resulted in 122 consecutive accurate sports predictions. Unable to talk, two bowls of food representing the competitors are placed before her, with the hen pecking at the one which represents the future winner. While the other penguins are intrigued, Kowalski immediately dismisses the ability as "pseudoscience bunk." He repeatedly attempts to disprove the hen's talent, but fails each time until he accidentally discovers a collection of the hen's notebooks, each one filled with various data and statistics used to logically predict winners scientifically. The hen, who was only faking silence as part of her act, then explains how she was able to con her way from her farm to the children's zoo and how she intends to continue her psychic act to launch a TV career and then attain the presidency. To put an end to her scheming, Kowalski seductively sings and dances for her as a distraction while Rico switches bowls before she can make a pick on live TV prior to a boxing match. The plan works, but the hen still finds an attraction to Kowalski. Guest voices: Audrey Wasilewski as the mental hen
136	20	"Siege the Day"	Written by : Bill Motz & Bob Roth; Storyboarded by : Sean Kreiner, Javier Secaduras, Jeremy Bernstein and Brian Morante	June 17, 2012 (Note: This episode was first released on Operation: Get Ducky DVD on February 14, 2012.)	238b	2.4
While the other penguins head out to a monster truck show, Private stays at the zoo to watch over Eggy and his siblings, Romana, Bradley, and Samuel, for Mother Duck. Overcautious about the ducklings' wellbeing, Private does not allow them to engage in any activities he considers unsafe or inappropriate for their age. When Julien learns from them that Private is not allowing them to have fun, he organizes a pool party for them, which several zoo animals attend. Soon after, noise from the party begins to disturb the sewer rats while the smell of grilling fruit attracts hornets from outside the zoo, with both groups demanding the food for themselves after it falls into the penguins' HQ. Trapped with the ducklings, Private places the HQ in lockdown and tries to keep the hornets and rats from gaining access, but soon concludes that they will eventually. He then decides to let both groups gain access simultaneously so that the hornets and rats will fight each other over the food, which results in both groups tiring themselves out and retreating. Throughout Private's adventure, the other penguins repeatedly fail to gain access to see the King Crush monster truck, and accidentally blow it up in the process. Guest voices: Jessica DiCicco as Ramona, Bradley & Samuel
137	21	"P.E.L.T."	Written by : Justin Charlebois; Storyboarded by : Sean Kreiner	July 29, 2012	311b	1.9
Skipper attempts to break his record on the obstacle course, but fails as he comes tenths slower than ever every time, worse than the last. Skipper decides to do P.E.L.T. to prove he is a leader. Meanwhile, Kowalski takes over as "Commander Kowalski" & begins using a ring binder of missions, which involve stuff such as saving King Julien from under the clock tower bell, cutting off the metal parts of the wall in Burt's habitat to free his trunk & freezing Marlene's pool to drain it (which Skipper observes while searching for Steps One, Two & Three of P.E.L.T.) Skipper however, believes he'd failed at the tasks & when he meets Kowalski & the others, he quits the team & requests Rico to smoke-bomb him. However, just as Kowalski answers Private's question on what happened, the three are caged & the Blue Hen grabs Kowalski's Freeze Ray & freezes Rico before he could regurgitate a stick of dynamite. She reveals she'd set everything up, all starting with malfunctioning the stopwatch & then, putting Julien under the bell, tying Burt's trunk & doing something to Marlene's place to the point Skipper would leave & she'd capture them. Kowalski attempts to distract her with his swagger, but she says she won't be distracted again. She says she'd freeze the zoo & become the star attraction as she was the only one left, become famous for being famous & become the next senator for Delaware, which Private interjected that last time she'd planned to be president, but she claims she's being more realistic. She freezes Kowalski & Private & leaves to freeze the zoo after sending them back to their habitat, Skipper appears a minute after she leaves as he came back for his mug. Just as he's about to leave, he notices the other penguins are in ice cubes, he uncovers Private's face & Private tells him it was an ambush. Skipper goes out & attacks the Hen in the Lemur Habitat & cuts his way through every blast of Antarctic coldness in the freeze ray & manages to freeze the Hen. The other penguins spend their time recovering from hypothermia by the ice cubes in a large flat pan of hot water while Skipper congratulates himself, drinking fish coffee on top of the frozen poultry.
138	22	"Private and the Winky Factory"	Written by : Brandon Sawyer; Storyboarded by : Jean-Sebastian Duclos	July 29, 2012	307b	1.9
After finding out that the factory that makes his beloved Winky candy is shutting down, the penguins of course freak out, especially Private, who refuses to let the final chance to get a few more boxes of Winkys pass by. Impressed by his passion, Skipper lets Private lead the operation. From the start of his command things go haphazardly when Private lets Rico have Marshmeow-Meows (Rico calls them meow-meows), sugar-coated marshmallow kittens, causing a sugar rush that make him go crazy and run amok. The team bind him and keep going with the operation but Rico (who is still crazy) kicks Kowalski into some sticky candy who's promptly picked up in the jaws of a grabber hand. On the production line again, the team is floating on a marshmallow river with Private and Skipper in the lead; Kowalski tries to restrain Rico, only for Rico to smash him with a lollipop knocking him into the river. Private throws a rope to lasso him while Skipper takes Rico. They both pull him in so hard he flies right into the wall and falls into a box of sugar. Private tells Rico that there will be no more marshmallow kittens, then Kowalski crawls out of the box looking like a big Marshmeow-Meow. Rico starts chasing Kowalski and the team find all the boxes of Winkys. Still in pursuit of Kowalski, both him and Rico are sucked up into a pipe causing the control desk to overload and blow up. Everything starts getting sucked up into the pipes. Faced with choosing between the team or Winkys, Private chooses the Winkys. As he is about to eat one he feels a rush of guilt for letting down his friends and goes after them. The pipes lead to the outside of the factory where he finds Skipper and apologizes. Skipper tells him it's okay as long as he learnt his lesson. Private says that he learnt not to put candy before friends, but Skipper replies the lesson is that leadership is Skipper's job! Just then Rico is looking and sounding sick. Skipper starts to say that he may have eaten too many Marshmeow-Meows when Rico pukes up Kowalski, who hisses a wide eyed "The things I have seen!". Rico then accuses Kowalski of being a "bad meow-meow" before passing out.
139	23	"Best Laid Plantains"	Written by : Bill Motz & Bob Roth; Storyboarded by : Kenji Ono and Jeremy Bernstein	November 3, 2012	311a	2.5
King Julien sneaks into the gorilla habitat when Bada and Bing receive a shipment of plantains, which results in him and Marlene being forced to go on the run when they give into temptation and eat all of the plantains.
140	24	"Skipper Makes Perfect"	Written by : Brandon Sawyer; Storyboarded by : Jean-Sebastian Duclos and Tom Bernardo	November 3, 2012	313b	2.5
Convinced that he is experiencing a rare phenomenon known as a perfect day, where everything he attempts will automatically work out, Skipper attempts to arrange a plan to break into the Danish Embassy to destroy his file and allow him to return to Denmark.
141	25	"Marble Jarhead"	Written by : Brandon Sawyer; Storyboarded by : Kenji Ono and Fred Osmond	November 10, 2012	315a	2.12
Rico must be on his best behavior if he wants to get new accessories for Miss Perky (his beloved doll), but this proves hard to do when the doll itself has been stolen by King Julien.
142	26	"Goodnight and Good Chuck"	Written by : Gabriel Garza; Storyboarded by : Sean Kreiner	November 10, 2012	315b	2.12
Chuck Charles loses his job as a news anchor and gets a new one at the zoo, but tries to get his old one back by exposing the penguins' operation to the world. Guest voices: Dee Bradley Baker as Pete Peters
Nicktoons
143	27	"Tunnel of Love"	Written by : Justin Charlebois; Storyboarded by : Fred Osmond	February 14, 2015	313a	0.13
When a massive sneeze from Rico causes the tunnel system beneath the zoo to rupture Skipper calls in four beavers to fix the situation. The beavers become distracted by two girl badgers. Can Skipper fix this teenage love entanglement before the whole zoo collapses into a sink hole? Guest voices: Big Time Rush as the beavers, Jennette McCurdy as Becky & Victoria Justice as Stacy
144	28	"Best Foes"	Written by : Gabriel Garza; Storyboarded by : Sean Kreiner	October 10, 2015	308a	N/A
Kowalski's enemy detector malfunctions and causes Skipper to believe all of his friends are enemies, and all of his enemies are friends, including Hans.
145	29	"Night of the Vesuviuses"	Written by : Bill Motz & Bob Roth; Storyboarded by : Fred Osmond	October 10, 2015	308b	N/A
When the Vesuvius Twins buy all the tickets to the annual zoo sleepover, the penguins try to plant a seed of good inside the troublemakers.
146	30	"The Penguin Who Loved Me"	Written by : Bill Motz & Bob Roth; Storyboarded by : Tom Bernardo, Jeremy Bernstein and Emmanuel Deligiannis	October 11, 2015	314	N/A
Kowalski is recruited by his love interest Doris the dolphin and her new boyfriend Parker the platypus to rescue her brother Francis from an aqua fun park. But Francis turns out to be none other than Dr. Blowhole, whom the penguins must stop from regaining his old memory and resuming his evil plans. Notes: This episode is 30-minutes. It guest stars Ty Burrell as Parker and Calista Flockhart as Doris.
147	31	"Operation: Lunacorn Apocalypse"	Written by : Brandon Sawyer; Storyboarded by : Jean-Sebastian Duclos and Kenji Ono	October 11, 2015	309	N/A
Private accidentally frees an ancient spirit from its urn, allowing it to wreak havoc on planet Earth in an attempt to destroy it. But much to the spirit's misfortune, instead of possessing Private, it possesses his Lunacorn doll. Note: This episode is a double length special. Guest voices: Conan O'Brien as Kuchikukan & Clyde Kusatsu as Shingen
148	32	"Operation: Swap-panzee"	Written by : Justin Charliebois; Storyboarded by : Jeremy Bernstein	January 4, 2016	312a	0.18
NASA intends to send Phil to the moon but end up sending Private instead, and now the rest of the penguins must work to get him back home.
149	33	"Snowmageddon"	Written by : Bill Motz & Bob Roth; Storyboarded by : Emmanuel Deligiannis	January 4, 2016 (Note: This episode was first released in Operation: Special Delivery DVD on November 4, 2014.)	312b	0.18
The penguins are about to start their autumn schedule when a severe blizzard scatters the team: Skipper and Marlene are trapped in a convenient store with Officer X, Kowalski and Private are stuck with Fred in his tree, and without Rico, they must find a way to save themselves.

== DVD releases ==
The Penguins of Madagascar home video releases
Season	Episodes	Years active	Release dates
Season	Episodes	Years active	Region 1
3	33	2012–16	Operation: Get Ducky: February 14, 2012; Episode(s): "Siege the Day" Operation: Special Delivery: November 4, 2014; Episode(s): "Antics on Ice" • "Snowmageddon"
