= The Hidden (Golding novel) =

2021 novel by Melanie Golding

- Author: Melanie Golding
- Language: English
- Publisher: Crooked Lane
- Publication date: 2021
- ISBN: 978-1-64385-297-3 (first edition, hardcover)
- LC Class: PR6107.O54 H54

The Hidden is a 2021 horror novel by Melanie Golding.

== Background and publication history ==
The book is based on the folktale of "The Mermaid Bride". The novel's protagonist Detective Jo Harper had previously appeared in Golding's debut novel Little Darlings. It was published on November 9, 2021, by Crooked Lane Books.

== Reception ==
The book received mostly positive reviews from critics, who noted its ambiguous and layered plotlines. Publishers Weekly wrote that "Golding smoothly mixes folklore with an insightful exploration of motherhood". Claire Forster, writing for Foreword Reviews, described the novel as a "superlative fairytale-infused thriller".
