= Genevieve Hidden =

French surgeon (1926–2016)

Geneviève Hidden
- Born: 1926
- Died: 2016 (aged 89–90)

Genevieve Hidden (1926 – June 27, 2016) was a French surgeon who specialised in lymphology. She was one of the first to demonstrate the safe transplantation of lymph nodes. She was a founding member of the European Society of Lymphology.

== Early life and education ==
Hidden was interested in anatomy and cadaver research. She completed her medical degree in 1958.

== Career ==
Hidden specialised in surgery and was made Chief of Clinical Surgery in 1959. In 1969, she became Professor of Anatomy and taught for thirty years. She was eventually made Chief of General Surgery at the Centre hospitalier intercommunal de Poissy-Saint-Germain-en-Laye where she focused on oncology, and the lymphatic system. She was the first to demonstrate that lymph node transplantation could be a safe procedure.

In 1979, Hidden joined with other lymphology researchers to establish the European Society of Lymphology. She served as president in 1983, and helped to organise several critical scientific conferences.

== Selected publications ==
- Corinne Becker; Jalal Assouad; Marc Riquet; Geneviève Hidden (1 March 2006). "Postmastectomy lymphedema: long-term results following microsurgical lymph node transplantation". Annals of Surgery. 243 (3): 313–315. doi:10.1097/01.SLA.0000201258.10304.16. ISSN 0003-4932. PMC 1448940. PMID 16495693. Wikidata Q44174538.
- Marc Riquet; Françoise Le Pimpec Barthes; Redha Souilamas; Geneviève Hidden (1 March 2002). "Thoracic duct tributaries from intrathoracic organs". The Annals of Thoracic Surgery. 73 (3): 892-8; discussion 898-9. doi:10.1016/S0003-4975(01)03361-6. ISSN 0003-4975. PMID 11899197. Wikidata Q77779794.
- Riquet M; Hidden G; Debesse B (1 April 1989). "Direct lymphatic drainage of lung segments to the mediastinal nodes. An anatomic study on 260 adults". The Journal of Thoracic and Cardiovascular Surgery. 97 (4): 623–632. ISSN 0022-5223. PMID 2927166. Wikidata Q69967689.
