= The Hidden (video game) =

2005 mod for Half-Life 2

The Hidden is a multiplayer total conversion mod for the popular Half-Life 2 computer game. The gameplay revolves around the retrieval of an escaped research subject where the subject is highly agile, incredibly strong, and nearly invisible. The first beta version was released on June 13, 2005, and its latest release was September 8, 2007.

== Gameplay ==
The Hidden is played by rounds. Each player selects one of the nine IRIS characters; each character is visually distinct, but does not have differing abilities that affect gameplay. A player may choose to play as two classes: Assault and Support. The main difference between Assault and Support is that Support can replenish teammates' ammo. The player also chooses a main weapon, a side arm, and an item. Each round, a player is selected automatically to be the Hidden, usually based on how much damage they dealt to the Hidden in previous rounds. All the other players play as the IRIS, whose goal is to work as a team to hunt down the Hidden and contain it. After the time limit hits, or either side kills the other, the round will end, and a new Hidden may be selected depending on a number of variables including who won the previous round, who dealt the most damage, etc.

== The Hidden ==
As the Hidden, the player is given several extra abilities not available to the IRIS; The Hidden is nearly invisible, with only a little distortion of the background indicating his presence, sticking to walls, and the ability to detect enemies' auras from a distance. Other abilities include pouncing and cannibalizing corpses of slain enemies to replenish health.

== Reception ==
In Mod DB's "Mod of 2005" competition, The Hidden won the Editor's Choice award for the best multiplayer, and in 2006 it won "Best Ambience" in the same competition. In 2006, the game took part in the Independent Games Festival, where it got to the finals of the "Best Half-Life 2 Mod" category, but lost to Dystopia.

The Hidden's asymmetrical gameplay was described by bit-tech.net as having influenced the 2015 game Evolve.
