= Maria L. T. Hidden =

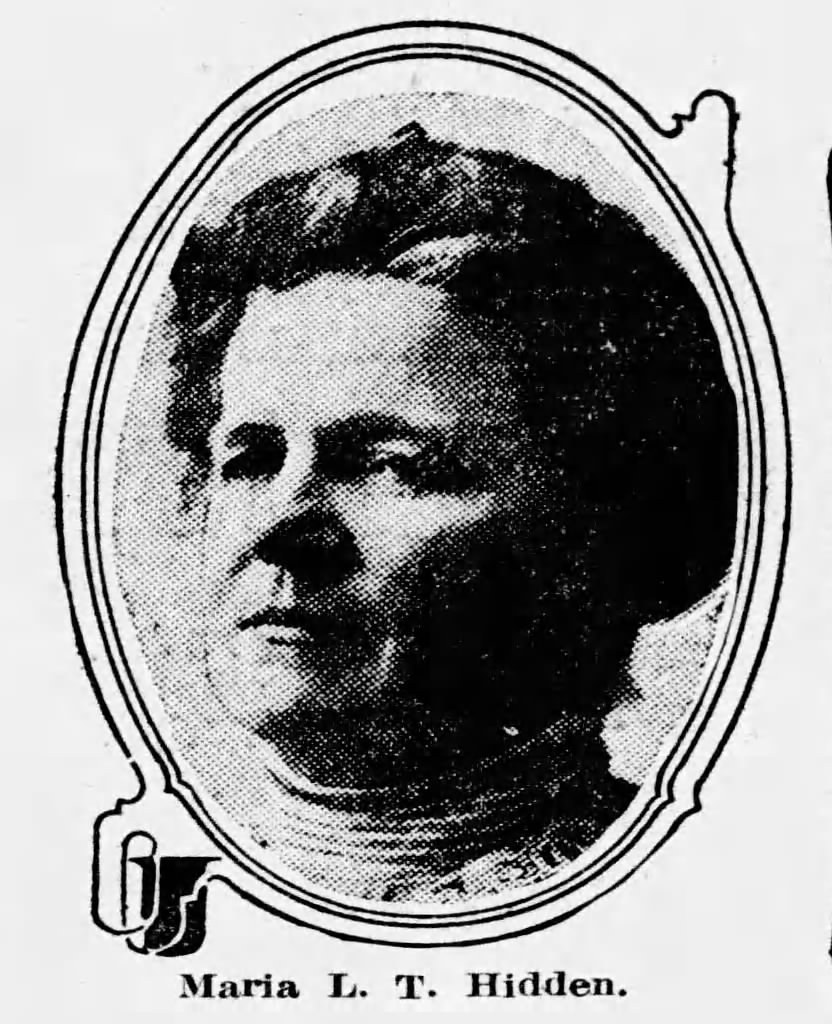
Maria L T Hidden in 1916

Maria Louisa Trenholm Hidden (June 15, 1847 – May 30, 1924) was an American suffragist and temperance advocate active in New England.

Hidden was born in Kingsey in Quebec on June 15, 1847 and early on, moved to Vermont. As a young woman, she was interested in activism, politics and music. On September 18, 1867, she married Jackson Hidden and the couple moved to Craftsbury, Vermont. She and her husband had four children together.

Hidden became active in the Vermont Woman's Christian Temperance Union (WCTU). She served a correspondent to the New England Woman Suffrage Association (NEWSA) in 1883. Hidden was elected the president of the Vermont Woman Suffrage Association (VWSA) in May 1884. She continued her suffrage and temperance work for several years.

Hidden and her family moved to Washington state in 1889. In Vancouver, she became the director of the board of education in 1899. She ran unsuccessfully for Portland County Commissioner in 1913. Hidden ran for office as a Democrat in Multnomah County in 1916. She ran for the House of Representatives on the Prohibition Ticket in 1918. In 1920, Hidden ran and was selected as a delegate for the Democratic National Convention. In that same year, she organized a chapter of the League of Women Voters for Oregon.

Hidden died in her home in Portland after a brief illness on May 30, 1924. She was buried in the city cemetery of Vancouver, Washington.
