= Hilden (surname) =

Hilden is a surname. Notable people with the surname include:

- Elizabeth Hilden (born 1969), American pornography model and tattoo and piercing parlor owner
- Jukka Hilden (born 1980), Finnish stunt performer
- Julie Hilden (1968–2018), American writer and lawyer
- Jytte Hilden (born 1942), Danish chemical engineer and politician
