= The Penguins of Madagascar season 1 =

The Penguins of Madagascar
- Season 1
- No. of episodes: 48

Release
- Original network: Nickelodeon
- Original release: November 28, 2008 – February 15, 2010

Season chronology
- Next → Season 2

This is a list of episodes for the first season of DreamWorks Animation's animated television series, The Penguins of Madagascar. The first episode, "Gone in a Flash", aired on Nickelodeon U.S. as a "sneak peek" on November 28, 2008. The series premiere formally occurred after the Nickelodeon 2009 Kids' Choice Awards with the episodes, "Launchtime" and "Haunted Habitat". During the season, several episodes were aired more than once.

The Double DVD Pack edition of Madagascar: Escape 2 Africa contained an early DVD of the show, featuring the episodes "Popcorn Panic" and "Gone in a Flash". "Popcorn Panic" was aired in several other countries before the U.S. until it first aired on Nickelodeon on May 9, 2009.

The first ever special episode of The Penguins of Madagascar aired on February 15, 2010. It was 30 minutes long and featured the first physical appearance of Skipper's nemesis, Dr. Blowhole.

== Episodes ==
No. overall	No. in season	Title	Written by	Storyboard by	Original release date	Prod. code	US viewers (millions)
1	1	"Gone in a Flash"	Todd Garfield	Sean Kreiner	November 28, 2008	101b	N/A
As Julien (Danny Jacobs) and Maurice (Kevin Michael Richardson) fight over a camera that had fallen into their habitat, the flash suddenly fires, resulting in Maurice falling out of the enclosure. However, since Julien sees Maurice's photo on the camera's display, he incorrectly assumes that Maurice became trapped inside the camera for failure to obey Julien's orders. The penguins (Tom McGrath, Jeff Bennett, John DiMaggio and James Patrick Stuart) do not believe this allegation, and instead set out to investigate what really happened, eventually locating Maurice at a New Jersey dump. Although he is initially delighted to be away from Julien, after the penguins' antics in trying to get him home, Maurice is relieved to be back in Julien's kingdom. Note: This episode was also released on DVD on February 6, 2009 as part of the Double DVD Pack of Madagascar: Escape 2 Africa.
2	2	"Launchtime"	Ron Anderson	Johane Matte	March 28, 2009	103a	6.1
After being annoyed by the lemurs, the penguins decide to take a vacation to the Moon to get away from them. They launch a rocket to reach their desired destination but, unbeknownst to them, wind up on a rooftop across from the zoo instead of on the lunar surface. There, they meet a stray cat who they believe to be a "Moon cat" who takes kindly to the foursome with an ulterior motive to eat them, though he later befriends them for real when given a gift of canned fish. After leaving the "Moon", however, the penguins realize they had never left Earth. During the time the penguins are on their mission, Julien and the other lemurs deal with booby traps in the penguins' habitat while trying to "borrow" their TV. Rico coughs up a hammer for Skipper who declares Operation Hammerhead to get revenge on the lemurs for their deception. Special guest star: Wayne Knight as Max
3	3	"Haunted Habitat"	Bob Schooley & Mark McCorkle	Christo Stamboliev	March 28, 2009	103b	6.1
Marlene (Nicole Sullivan) screams in the night when a strange sound wakes her up. The penguins and lemurs soon arrive at her habitat to investigate the scream, with Julien performing a song and dance routine designed to scare away the ghostly spirits to which he attributes the noise. However, shortly after the penguins' departure Marlene screams again, prompting them to reinvestigate. In the course of the investigation, Skipper and Marlene are knocked into the sewer underneath Marlene's habitat, where they soon uncover the true origin of the noise: an alligator named Roger who had made the noises in reaction to Marlene's loud snoring. Special guest star: Richard Kind as Roger
4	4	"Operation: Plush & Cover"	Eddie Guzelian	Dean Kelly	March 30, 2009	104a	4.9
After plush Mort toys become popular at the zoovenir store, Julien becomes jealous. When Marlene tells him about defective otter dolls having once been recalled, Julien gets an idea. The next day, due to contamination, an inventory of Mort toys is recalled to the factory, only with the real Mort among them due to his accidental fall into one of the boxes. After learning that Julien had sabotaged the toys with skunk spray, the penguins set out to rescue Mort (Andy Richter) from the toy factory, where the defective toys were slated for destruction. Julien later shows up as well, and Mort is rescued from the factory's chaos.
5	5	"Happy King Julien Day!"	Laura Gutin	Christo Stamboliev	March 31, 2009	104b	6.4
When some of the animals show apathy to celebrating the Julien-honoring holiday King Julien Day, Maurice warns them that not celebrating would result in Julien becoming angry and gets their participation by bribing them with a candy-filled piñata. Although Skipper abstains, he allows the other three penguins to partake, but is angered when some of the party's events interrupt his work. Meanwhile, the others are subjected to Julien's antics, including having fruit tossed at them and being compelled to bake him cakes. After all is said and done, Maurice presents the piñata, with Julien initially taking the "paper horse" and naming it Bob before sharing the candy inside with everyone.
6	6	"Paternal Egg-Stinct"	Todd Garfield	Tom Bernardo	April 1, 2009	105a	4.0
After reportedly finding an egg in her habitat, Marlene brings it to the penguins, hoping the fellow birds would watch over it. Although not initially wanting to take on the mission, Skipper agrees after Julien purports that the egg was the heir to his throne. As the other three penguins begin to place the egg through potentially dangerous training, Private fears for the safety of "Eggy" and cares for it lovingly on his shift until it is stolen by the lemurs. Once recovered, the little hatchling, a duck (Tara Strong), makes his debut and is soon returned to his mother (Tara Strong). Special guest star: Tara Strong as the mother duck and Eggy
7	7	"Assault & Batteries"	Bill Motz & Bob Roth	Johane Matte	April 2, 2009	105b	4.0
Julien's noisy music annoys the animals so Skipper steals the batteries from his boom box. Julien fights with Skipper while trying to recover his batteries and both of them fall into a compound occupied by Joey (James Patrick Stuart), a foul-tempered kangaroo. They need to work together to escape from Joey, and eventually do. A battery is lost, leaving the lemurs without music, but Skipper gives Julien a battery from a walkie-talkie, as thanks for saving him.
8	8	"Penguiner Takes All"	John Behnke & Rob Humphrey	Dean Kelly	April 6, 2009	106a	4.0
Julien starts to mock Skipper when Skipper will not allow him to play "Capture the Flag". Skipper eventually agrees to play against Julien, who wins, taking the penguins' TV as a prize. In successive rematches, Julien continues winning until he has all of the penguins' possessions. After finally realizing that the lemurs travel by the tree-tops, rather than by land, Skipper challenges the lemurs to one more rematch, for all or nothing. The penguins win by flying (using jet packs) and take all of the lemurs' possessions, including Julien's bouncing castle, Julien's crown, all of the penguins' possessions that the lemurs had taken in the previous matches, and Mort.
9	9	"Two Feet High and Rising"	Matt Negrete	Nick Filippi and Caleb Meurer	April 7, 2009	106b	3.6
After Mort's foot fetish leads to him accidentally destroying King Julien's floating chair, the king proclaims that anyone who touches his feet will be banished from his kingdom forever. Mort finds himself waking up, touching Julien’s feet, and is banished. Marlene brings Mort to the penguins to help Mort overcome his obsession, making him "100% lemur foot-phobic" but, when Julien floats away in his chair, Mort has to save him by grabbing his feet. In return for this, Julien withdraws his decree and allows Mort to hug his feet only once.
10	10	"Tangled in the Web"	Nate Knetchel	Tom Bernardo	April 8, 2009	102a	N/A
The penguins do not like the new webcams that have been installed around the zoo and rebel, but Julien plays to the cameras, because he wants to be voted most popular animal. When Private accidentally slips and falls into the fish bowl he becomes incredibly popular and is taken away to entertain his fans on stage. Julien's attempts to become more popular result in Mort being flipped onto Private's stage, destroying it. All of the cameras are knocked down, with one ending up pointing into the zoo kitchen, where Alice (Mary Scheer) is dancing while using a banana as a microphone. Private is rescued but the ultimate winner is Alice, who is voted most popular because of her kitchen antics.
11	11	"Crown Fools"	Bob Schooley & Mark McCorkle	Jay Shultz	April 9, 2009	102b	3.8
While trying to prove he can have fun on "Fun Day", Skipper causes Julien's crown to fall into the sewer, making Julien scream for hours. After a visit from an angry Maurice, the penguins set out to retrieve the crown. Meanwhile, Marlene tries to keep Julien calm, while he mourns for his cherished, missing crown. When the penguins find the crown, Skipper has to fight a giant rat (Diedrich Bader) for its return. When the crown is returned to Julien, he finds a smudge on it and calls for his spare crown. Furious at all that work wasted when he had a spare crown the whole time, Marlene makes Rico regurgitate a crowbar so that she can beat up Julien. Special guest star: Diedrich Bader as the Rat King
12	12	"The Hidden"	Chris Neuhahn and Scott Kreamer	Johane Matte	April 18, 2009	107a	4.9
Marlene and Mort visit the new neighbors at the zoo to welcome them but the new neighbors take Mort. Meanwhile, Kowalski is having problems because he thinks out everything too much, never acting on instinct. Marlene reports Mort's disappearance to the penguins, who set off to rescue Mort. They find that Julien and Maurice are also present in the new neighbors' enclosure. One by one, the animals disappear, leaving only Kowalski to rescue them all. Kowalski captures two of the hostiles, who turn out to be friendly chameleons who only wanted to everyone to come to a party.
13	13	"Kingdom Come"	Eddie Guzelian	Christo Stamboliev	April 18, 2009	107b	4.9
When Julien is taken to the zoo hospital following a hysterical episode, Maurice agrees to look after affairs until Julien returns. However, after sitting on the throne and eating some of Julien's lychee nuts, Maurice declares himself king and insists that all animals swear allegiance to him. After he shuts down power and water to all habitats, the penguins attempt to take action, but are captured. After freeing themselves, they visit Julien at the veterinary office and find him cured, his condition having been caused by a batch of bad lychee nuts, which affected him psychologically. Maurice is later cured when Mort dispenses an aerosol of a guavaberry antidote at him.
14	14	"Little Zoo Coupe"	Bill Motz & Bob Roth	Tom Bernardo	April 24, 2009	108a	4.8
After seeing the penguins driving about in their car, Julien requests to drive it, but is denied. Still desiring a vehicle, Julien steals Alice's zoo cart and soon challenges the penguins to a race, with the winner taking the loser's car as a prize. The penguins agree, but after subsequently realizing that their car has no chance of victory in its current state, overhaul it to be race-worthy. In the race, the penguins make a comeback after being subjected to a few cheating maneuvers by the lemurs, only to lose the race when a banana peel dropped by Phil causes the penguins' car to spin-out. Luckily, Kowalski installed an "eject King Julien" button in their car to prevent him from driving it. Guest singer: Bret Michaels guest stars by singing "Wheels of Thunder".
15	15	"All Choked Up"	Brandon Sawyer	Christo Stamboliev	April 24, 2009	108b	4.8
After a robotic zoo guide is set up to field visitors' questions, the penguins see it as a threat and seek to destroy it. Rico regurgitates and Skipper activates a time bomb for the aforementioned purpose, but Rico is forced to swallow it when Alice comes to give him an anti-vomiting drug after observing him dry-heaving. This results in Rico having a ticking time bomb inside his stomach with no way to expel it. After trying several tactics, his teammates fail to get him to regurgitate again, so they begin their goodbyes. Fortunately, their touching words trigger Rico's "gooey love/mush sensitivity", causing him to expel the bomb seconds before detonation and the bomb lands on the robotic zoo guide, destroying it and giving the penguins a double victory in the process.
16	16	"Popcorn Panic"	Paul Rugg and Bob Schooley & Mark McCorkle	Bret Haaland and Tom Bernardo	May 9, 2009 (Note: This episode was also released on DVD on February 6, 2009 as part of the Double DVD Pack of Madagascar: Escape 2 Africa.)	101a	3.8
The animals get zoo visitors to feed them popcorn until Alice catches a boy giving some to Marlene. Alice yells at the boy and slaps "Do not feed the animals" signs around the zoo. The animals assemble to determine how to get popcorn on their own, but the penguins and lemurs do not want to work together. The penguins and lemurs each get their own bag of popcorn from zoo storage. When they get back to the zoovenir shop, they find kernels instead. Julien believes they are "popcorn eggs" that need to be hatched. The penguins try interrogating a kernel, but Alice finds a trail of them leading to their habitat. Private and Skipper hide the bag in the incinerator, causing a popcorn explosion. They land in Marlene's habitat and she congratulates them on their job well done. Meanwhile Julien thinks he has been rewarded by the salty snack gods.
17	17	"Go Fish"	Eddie Guzelian	Dean Kelly	May 30, 2009	109a	3.6
The penguins perform their usual cuteness routine, but instead of fish receive fish-shaped cake imitations. Julien is thrilled not having to deal with the fish smell anymore. The penguins hope the terrible fish cakes are just a one-time thing but the next day they get more. They plan a mission to obtain real fish and get Pinky the flamingo (Kevin Michael Richardson) for aerial support. Julien learns of the plan and decides to stop it. The penguins put their plan into action and obtain several crates of fish from the delivery truck, but when they return to the zoo, Julien tells them that he secretly switched the crates of fish with crates of fish cakes. Julien and Skipper argue back and forth over who switched the crates before whom, but when both sets of crates are opened they all contain fish cakes. It is revealed that Pinky had taken the real fish.
18	18	"Miracle on Ice"	Bill Motz & Bob Roth	Caleb Meurer and Doug Murphy	May 30, 2009	109b	3.8
The penguins are playing hockey when they are challenged by a group of rats (from Crown Fools) to a match, since they cannot go back into their sewer because the pipes burst. The rats say they are no good at hockey, and the penguins agree to the game. The winner would get the ice, and the rats beat the penguins, having lied about their skills. After the loss, the penguins begin practicing on the lemurs' ice, but Julien will not let them practice unless he is on the team. They recruit the lemurs as cheerleaders. After improving, the penguins replay the rats, and start out with the upper hand, but the rats start to play rough. They send Private flying into the porcupine exhibit, body slam Kowalski, and put Skipper in a cast. They're forced to use the lemurs are replacements. When one of the rats skates over Julien's foot, he becomes extremely enraged and starts whacking pucks everywhere until the rats surrender, winning back the penguins' ice.
19	19	"Needle Point"	Bill Motz & Bob Roth	Tom Bernardo	June 6, 2009	110a	3.9
The penguins undergo a routine checkup with the zoo veterinarian (Brian George) until Skipper runs out, avoiding his shot. He tells the others they are evacuating, but Alice has locked down the zoo. The penguins discover Skipper has not taken his shot, and Skipper agrees to take it, but he runs away. The penguins try to capture him, but he evades them. Private rips off Skipper's hospital ankle bracelet by accident, giving him an idea. He will take Skipper's shot. Alice captures Private and takes him to the veterinarian. Skipper sees this and the chimps inform Skipper a second shot could make Private become sick, or worse. He goes back to the veterinarian's office and tells Private that he will take the shot. Afterwards, Alice tells the penguins they have an appointment with the dentist, and Kowalski screams in terror. Private states, "But we don't have teeth."
20	20	"Eclipsed"	Kim Duran and Bob Schooley & Mark McCorkle	Johane Matte	June 6, 2009	110b	3.9
Mason (Conrad Vernon) and Phil's quiet morning is ruined when the lemurs show up. Fed up with them, they decide to trick Julien with a solar eclipse. They tell him he has infuriated the "Sky Spirits" and reprimand him for his wayward behavior and he has to change his ways. Julien promises to be nice to everyone just as the total eclipse ends. The new nice Julien annoys the zoo more than before. The penguins figure out Mason and Phil tricked Julien, and they decide to trick Julien back into being his old self. They try to use lightning as the signal from the Sky Spirits, but Julien is too distraught to see it. He then mistakes the rainbow following the rainstorm caused by the lightning as a sign and returns to normal. The episode ends with Julien, Maurice and Mort annoying the chimps once again.
21	21	"Mort Unbound"	Bill Motz & Bob Roth	Caleb Meurer	June 26, 2009	111a	N/A
Julien is throwing fruit away, and throws a mango into the gorilla habitat. Mort gets it, but gets thrown out into the penguins' HQ, into the beam of Kowalski's super-ray designed to enhance fish, making Mort muscularly large. Mort goes back for the mango and the gorillas tell him to beat them up for it, so he does. Realizing Mort is super strong, Julien uses him to steal food from the other animals, but when Mort asks for a banana, Julien says no. Fed up with constantly being mistreated, Mort uses his new-found strength to eat as much food as he wants and hug Julien's feet. Kowalski prepares an antidote for Mort, but Mort refuses to take it. Mort beats them up and Private is launched back to HQ where he gets zapped by the super-ray. A large, muscular Private then is able to force Mort to take the medicine and return to normal. When it is Private's turn to drink the antidote, he refuses.
22	22	"Roomies"	Madellaine Paxson	Doug Murphy	June 26, 2009	111b	N/A
Marlene is excited about receiving a new roommate, but Skipper feels the new arrival may have ulterior motives. When Marlene's roommate, a female walrus named Rhonda, arrives, she displays rude and obnoxious behaviors toward Marlene, but Marlene tries to remain positive. However, as the abuses continue, Marlene eventually reaches her breaking point and works with the penguins to transfer Rhonda away. When Marlene subsequently learns that Rhonda is headed for a polar bear reserve, she and the penguins work to reacquire her and reroute her transfer to Hoboken. Skipper's paranoia about Rhonda later proves correct when she is revealed to have stolen Kowalski's invention for Skipper's arch-enemy, a dolphin named Dr. Blowhole. Special guest star: Kathy Kinney as Rhonda
23	23	"Misfortune Cookie"	Bill Motz & Bob Roth	Caleb Meurer	August 1, 2009	114a	N/A
The zoo animals order Chinese food. All the penguins read their fortune cookies and are happy with the results. However, Rico's fortune reads "You will soon meet a foul end". While Rico and the penguins do not believe in curses, Julien tries to make them believe by tricking Rico into believing he is cursed. It works and Rico becomes terrified. Skipper then confronts Julien and they agree to make Rico think that he is not cursed by going through with an ancient lemur ceremony. After the ritual, a duck lands on Rico, Private reveals the true meaning of the fortune: the duck's bottom is a "fowl end".
24	24	"Lemur See, Lemur Do"	Bill Motz & Bob Roth	Christo Stamboliev	August 1, 2009	112b	N/A
A lemur robot called the LEM-R (Life-EMulating Robot) is sent to the lemur habitat to learn lemur behavior before it heads to Mars. Initially King Julien is annoyed by the LEM-R's mimicking nature, however once he learns of its real purpose, Julien is ecstatic to be its "role model" and names the LEM-R "Lemmy". Julien teaches the robot how to dance, but Mort becomes jealous of Lemmy. The penguins want to teach the robot the skills it really needs for its mission to Mars. Working together with Mort, the penguins kidnap Lemmy and refuse to let the robot leave from its "rehabilitation". The robot activates self-defense mode and fights against the penguins until it explodes. Julien is depressed when he finds out what happened. Filled with remorse, the penguins rebuild Lemmy and King Julien is elated once again. But when Lemmy is sent to Mars, it is eaten by a "space squid".
25	25	"Roger Dodger"	Eddie Guzelian	Dean Kelly	August 17, 2009	112a	N/A
Roger the alligator comes up to the penguins' HQ when the Rat King and his minions invade Roger's home and throw him out. Roger tells the penguins he tried being nice to the rats, but his efforts were not successful. He is not comfortable with being aggressive to get his home back. The penguins decide to help Roger confront the rats. When training Roger fails to be a viable option, Kowalski rigs up a mind-switching machine so that Rico, inside Roger's body, could take care of the rats. Unfortunately, after defeating the rats, "Rico" begins to go on a rampage, tearing apart the zoo and the city. (Kowalski attributes this to the differential between an alligator's cold blood and a penguin's warm blood.) The penguins and "Roger" then try to stop "Rico", who is eventually brought down when "Roger" sings a lullaby, in a Jack Haley-style singing voice. Once Roger and Rico are back to normal, Roger conducts the penguins in singing as a barbershop quartet.
26	26	"Skorca!"	Brandon Sawyer	Tom Bernardo	August 17, 2009	115a	N/A
While alone on aerial recon duty one night, Private sees a flying orca. He alerts all of the zoo animals to the presence of the predator, which Julien dubs a "skorca", a contraction of "sky orca". While the penguins set off to track down the skorca, Julien engages the services of Joey the kangaroo to eliminate the threat. After discovering that Private consumed an entire box of "Winkys" during his patrol the penguins believe the skorca sighting was a hallucination resulting from a sugar high. They change their minds when they see the skorca, which is actually just a large parade balloon. During a fight with Joey for the privilege of destroying the skorca, Private pops the balloon and he flies away with it. Believing he is dead, the penguins hold a memorial service for Private but he returns during the service with part of the skorca and is treated as a hero.
27	27	"Otter Gone Wild"	John Behnke & Rob Humphrey	Johane Matte	August 18, 2009	113a	N/A
After cleaning their habitat in record time, the penguins head out for snow cones as a reward. They invite Marlene who initially accepts but panics after finding out the snow cone stand is outside the zoo, revealing she was born in captivity. However, Skipper reassures her that she will be safe with the penguins and Marlene agrees to go. Julien also joins the group without an invitation. Once outside the zoo, Marlene is overwhelmed by the outside world and goes wild. She kidnaps Julien and becomes amorous with him. The penguins manage to find them, but Marlene then carries Julien to the top of Cleopatra's Needle, where the penguins fight her using radio controlled planes. The penguins eventually rescue Julien and trap Marlene in a cage before getting their snow cones and returning to the zoo where Marlene returns to normal. Special guest star: Fred Stoller as Fred
28	28	"Cat's Cradle"	Brandon Sawyer	Tom Bernardo	August 19, 2009	113b	N/A
The penguins try to hide their stray cat friend, Max (from "Launchtime"), from an animal control officer dubbed "Officer X". The penguins try to get him to the sewers, but the entire area outside the zoo has been booby trapped by Officer X. The penguins then hide him in Julien's bounce house, but that fails. They then use Max's scent in Joey's habitat so Joey could take out X, but the reverse happens. Phil and Mason suggest that Max pretend to be a "red Rhodesian slasher" an "ultra-rare, incredibly vicious wildcat", which is coming to the zoo. Officer X at first falls for Max's disguise, but Max accidentally blows his cover while dancing in triumph. He is saved from capture by Alice, who puts him in a cage to mate with a female red Rhodesian slasher. After getting beaten up by the female during the courtship ritual, Max begs for help, so the penguins create a diversion for Officer X by disguising Mort as a rabid Chihuahua. Max escapes, but Officer X catches him, but it turns out to be the female slasher Rico had painted to resemble Max. The female slasher beats up X and Mort sets off all of the traps so Max can escape safely. Special guest star: Cedric Yarbrough as Officer X
29	29	"Monkey Love"	Nick Stanton & Devin Bunje	Doug Murphy	August 20, 2009	114b	N/A
A female chimpanzee named Lulu is transferred from the Hoboken Zoo while her habitat is being fixed. Phil falls in love with her and asks Mason (in sign language) to help him win her heart. Since Mason does not know how to help, they go to Marlene for advice, but the penguins take over. The penguins have Mason speak to Lulu for Phil. However, this backfires, with Lulu thinking Mason likes her. The penguins then try having Phil save Lulu first from desperadoes and then a falling crate of bananas, but both plans fail. A love potion and roller disco plan also fail. In the end Phil decides to just speak his true feelings to her via sign language, which Lulu understands except for the last part, which Mason then translates for her. Phil and Lulu fall in love and walk away together. Special guest star: Jane Leeves as Lulu
30	30	"Tagged"	Eddie Guzelian	Dean Kelly, Sean Kreiner and Johane Matte	August 21, 2009	115b	N/A
The zoo animals are freezing due to the weather, except the penguins because they have heat lamps, but they too have to deal with the cold weather when a scientist comes to study penguin behavior. Using plush toys as decoys, the penguins slip out and raise the steam output, warming the zoo animals. Before Kowalski can install a cooling line to the furnace, they are forced to return to their habitat. They are given ankle monitors and cannot leave their habitat. Kowalski warns the furnace will explode without the cooling line. They send the lemurs a walkie-talkie and Kowalski instructs them how to install the cooling line. The other penguins try to keep the scientist from getting suspicious. The lemurs install the cooling line to the air conditioning system by mistake. To stop the impending pressure reaction, Julien opens the main water valve, flooding the furnace room.
31	31	"What Goes Around"	Brandon Sawyer	Sean Kreiner	September 19, 2009	116a	4.0
At closing time, the penguins hear a little girl crying that she has lost her doll. The penguins try to return it, but the doll hits the girl and bounces into the sewer. The penguins decide to use Rico's doll as a replacement, which upsets Rico. After delivering the doll to the girl's home, Private tries to cheer up Rico with the prospect that "The Universe owes him one." However, security cameras spot the penguins and animal control is called. The penguins are captured by Officer X (Cat's Cradle). The penguins escape into the sewer, but Officer X's high-tech van allows him to break into the sewer and chase after them. A game of Cat and mouse between Officer X and the Penguins occurs until they destroy his van. X gains the upper hand and lassos them, but the penguins try to cause a sewage pipe to spray sewage on X. Nothing comes out at first, but then Officer X is hit with the original doll and then raw sewage. Skipper gives the doll to Rico. They return home and watch a news report showing X being arrested for "a vandalism spree over several city blocks."
32	32	"Mask of the Raccoon"	Bill Motz & Bob Roth	Doug Murphy	September 19, 2009	116b	3.8
One night, several of the zoo animals' possessions are stolen. When the penguins learn their TV is gone too, they set out to find the thief. The thief is revealed to be a raccoon with a green hat, looking like Robin Hood, named "The Archer". The Archer eludes the penguins, but in the end they apprehend him. They take The Archer back to their base and confront him, but The Archer explains that he is actually a giver for the zooless. The zoo animals each give him something. The next morning, Private decides to give The Archer a gift, his favorite butterscotch lollipop. They head out and meet up with Fred, a clueless squirrel, who Kowalski first met in "Otter Gone Wild", and after a conversation, they figure out that The Archer is actually a con man by the name of Archie. They chase him down again, but Private throws his lollipop and stops Archie's escape. They force The Archer to be a true hero. Special guest star: Rob Paulsen as Archie
33	33	"Out of the Groove"	Bill Motz & Bob Roth	Wolf-Rüdiger Bloss	October 12, 2009	118a	3.7
Julien comes to the penguins and announces that his ability to dance has disappeared. In a flashback, Julien recalls how it happened: Jealous that the baboons' dance routine was attracting more attention than his own, Julien dropped a crate of skunks into their habitat, and was cursed in retaliation by lead baboon Darla, trapping his "groove" in a jar. Darla states that she will return the groove if Julien apologizes, but Julien refuses. Later, during a chase, the groove-containing jar is shattered and its magic transferred into Skipper, who uses his newly acquired and undesired dance skills against Julien physically to force him into apologizing to Darla. Guest star: Grey DeLisle as Darla
34	34	"Jungle Law"	Brandon Sawyer	Christo Stamboliev	October 12, 2009	118b	3.7
When the zoo experiences a blackout, Julien declares that since it is without power, he is in charge due to the zoo effectually becoming a jungle, which he is the king of. Skipper warns Julien that "jungle law" will inevitably fail and that he will tell Julien "I told you so" when it does. Not long after, Skipper's fear proves true when most zoo animals (save the penguins, Marlene, Maurice, and Julien) turn the zoo upside down with chaotic, apocalyptic behavior. It is then up to the penguins to restore order and protect Julien from the chaos. After, when the once-chaotic animals wish to catapult Julien out of the zoo for allowing the disarray to happen, Skipper convinces them that Julien had brilliantly set up the whole chaotic scenario to take their minds off the blackout.
35	35	"I Was a Penguin Zombie"	Brandon Sawyer	Wolf-Rüdiger Bloss	October 24, 2009	119a	5.1
Shortly after severely breaking his left flipper in a fall, Skipper sees the zoo veterinarian, who applies a strong muscle-relaxing cream to it and bandages it before caging Skipper for observation. When the doctor leaves, a still-groggy Skipper tries to escape the office, but in the process, a medical horror movie on TV is accidentally turned on. The other penguins overhear it and believe real doctors are talking, convincing them Skipper died of an infection. While still trying to escape, Skipper accidentally gets wrapped in gauze material, and when he gets out, pursues the others, who believe that he is a zombie. After first running, the others decide to try to capture Skipper and perform painful tests on him to reverse the zombie state. Eventually, while on the ledge of a top of a building, Skipper manages to tell the others to "stop", but all four soon fall from the roof, breaking their flippers.
36	36	"Sting Operation"	Brandon Sawyer	Dean Kelly	October 24, 2009	119b	5.1
After discovering a hornet nest by the clock tower, the penguins try to convince the insects to move their nest outside the zoo, but are met with stings and chased away. After trying again and failing, the penguins soon find out that Mort is so stupid that he can not feel pain, and try to have Mort remove the nest, but he does not understand the mission. Kowalski soon invents an invention designed to make Private stupid enough to not be affected by pain as well, but the device soon renders all four stupid. After some frolicking, the penguins begin to take on the hornets, but soon return to their normal selves when Mort crushes the cardboard box the penguins' normal brain thoughts were stored in. Mort then, to try to obtain honey for Julien, rips apart the hornet nest, which causes the hornets to flee the zoo.
37	37	"All King, No Kingdom"	Bill Motz & Bob Roth	Doug Murphy	November 14, 2009	121a	4.4
After learning that Maurice and Mort accidentally broke his throne while he was away, Julien banishes them to a tiny section of the lemur habitat. Though initially upset, Maurice soon sees the situation optimistically and wishes to throw a party in his and Mort's section. Meanwhile, Julien begins to find himself lonely, and he goes to the penguins. Not long after, when he is denied access to Mort and Maurice's party, Julien tries having his own with the penguins, but by including stuffed animals as guests, it becomes apparent that Julien desperately needs his real subjects back. Soon after, Julien reconnects with Maurice and Mort, and all are friends again.
38	38	"Untouchable"	Bill Motz & Bob Roth	Christo Stamboliev	November 14, 2009	121b	4.4
The episode starts with Alice bringing in a new addition to the zoo. The new animal turns out to be a frog, named Barry. At first, all the others think he is cute when he says he gets what he wants. When he just lays a finger on Rico's foot, he is automatically poisoned and stunned, and the penguins find out that he is a poison dart frog. The penguins try to get rid of Barry, but Kowalski and Skipper soon get poisoned too. Private has an idea: He creates a robot suit, and tells Barry that he could touch him, but Barry cannot touch Private. Private scares him, but they soon end up hugging. Skipper, Kowalski, and Rico wake up recovered from toxins and find the frog in the penguin's HQ playing Checkers with Private (who is still in the robot suit). Skipper then sends himself, Rico and Kowalski back to bed believing that they are having hallucinations. Special guest star: Kevin McDonald as Barry
39	39	"Over Phil"	Doug Molitor	Doug Murphy	November 27, 2009	123b	4.5
Mason becomes fed up with Phil's sloppy actions and leaves the chimp habitat. Private hears their fight and allows Mason to come to the penguin habitat for a visit. Mason just happens to visit as the penguins are cleaning up and (because he is a clean freak) decides he wants to move in with the penguins. Mason then learns that because the penguins are so clean, he has nothing for himself to clean up, and because of this, Mason starts to make his own messes for himself to clean up. Concerned and annoyed by this, Skipper and the rest of the penguins go to the chimp habitat, where Phil is apparently throwing a party with the gorillas and Joey. The habitat gets so messy that the penguins have to rescue the gorillas and Joey but can not find Phil. Mason then finds Phil's hand in the garbage and gets him out. The two chimps finally become friends again. After everything is back to normal, Private joined the chimps for tea and Phil has become quite a gentleman...more or less.
40	40	"Miss Understanding"	Brandon Sawyer	Sean Kreiner	November 27, 2009	123a	4.5
When Alice tells a boy visitor that only three of the penguins are males, the penguins conduct a gender-determining DNA test, which labels Skipper female. Although he first panics, Skipper soon accepts his femininity, but later resigns from the team when his feminine behavior causes difficulty performing typical commando functions with the others. But after seeking stereotypical female advice from Marlene, Skipper is forced to revert to his inner commando when he has to save the lemurs from electrocution. It is later determined that a blown fuse had resulted in an inaccurate DNA reading and that Skipper had been male all along.
41	41	"An Elephant Never Forgets"	Brandon Sawyer	Dean Kelly	December 5, 2009	122a	3.9
Burt the elephant (John DiMaggio) wants the penguins to help him break out of the zoo. They make up a plan to distract Alice, disguising Burt as an ice cream truck. The lemurs think he is a real ice cream truck. Burt gets mad and breaks open the gates. Then, they find papers on the wall behind a stack of hay. Many years ago, a kid (who the zoo animals at the time referred to as "Kid Kazoo") liked to scare the animals with his kazoo. Burt could not take it anymore. They see a picture of the kid grown up. The penguins find Burt in a building. It seems Burt is trying to crush Kid Kazoo, but he actually wanted to give him his old kazoo back. Then, the penguins disguise Burt as an art display, using a Jackson Pollock-esque painting from the wall of Kid Kazoo's so they can return Burt to the zoo.
42	42	"Otter Things Have Happened"	Bill Motz & Bob Roth	Tom Bernardo	December 5, 2009	122b	3.9
Kowalski wanted to test his new invention, the Luv-u-Lator. They needed a guinea pig but Marlene was the closest species. Marlene refuses to tell them who her date is. They find out her date lives in the park. They search for him and they find a box with Fred the Squirrel looking in there. The penguins thought Kowalski's invention was wrong. Marlene actually likes him and she hopes he can play the Spanish guitar. Julien is jealous because he sees Fred walking with Marlene and he thinks Marlene is his girlfriend. Julien tries to settle this by fighting with Fred in the reptile house with sticks. Fred did not know what to do. Julien repeatedly hit himself. Fred accidentally hits Julien with his stick. Marlene and the penguins find Fred and see him fighting with Julien. Marlene then gets mad at Julien and walks away with Fred. Later, Marlene finds out that Fred is stupid and can not play the Spanish guitar. So, she breaks up with him. Fred goes back home and sees Antonio, a muscular, male otter, walking through the bushes. Then, the episode ends with Antonio playing his Spanish guitar. Antonio was Marlene's real date.
43	43	"Zoo Tube"	Justin Charlebois	Dean Kelly and Kirk Hansen	January 2, 2010	124b	4.3
The popularity of a new television network, the Dumb Animal Channel, results in the slated closure of the zoo because it is unable to compete. In an effort to bring tourists back to the zoo, the animals decide to film a TV commercial highlighting the zoo and then broadcast it via a signal-overriding unit. Once the unit is ready and the commercial filmed, the animals begin their broadcast, but Julien increases the power to achieve a greater broadcast range, causing the receiving satellite to overload and explode. This, however, inadvertently destroys the DAC's broadcast, and with no animals to then see on TV, tourists return to the zoo.
44	44	"Snakehead!"	Bill Motz & Bob Roth	Doug Murphy	January 2, 2010	125a	4.3
"Mother Duck" and her ducklings discover a monstrous snakehead fish living in their pond. They ask for the penguins' help getting rid of the deadly fish, which the penguins try to accomplish by building a submarine. Everyone except Skipper is afraid of the fish, so when the submarine gets stuck in an old tire, Skipper goes outside to untangle it and is swallowed by the giant fish in the process. The remaining penguins, under Kowalski's leadership, forge ahead to avenge Skipper. At the end, the others see that Skipper is alive in the mouth of the fish and toss him a bottle of soda that had been shaken up earlier when Julien tried christening the submarine. It causes the fish to blow up, and it is soon served as sushi by the penguins.
45	45	"Jiggles"	Bob Schooley & Mark McCorkle	Christo Stamboliev	January 16, 2010	124a	4.2
Kowalski creates a living cube of green gelatinous matter (parody of Flubber) after a night of working in his lab, which soon develops a taste for fruit and a hatred of fish. When the cube, which Kowalski names "Jiggles", begins to increase in size, the other penguins begin to get concerned, but Kowalski continues trying to bond with the material, including after it breaks out of the HQ. A mission by the penguins to then recapture Jiggles ultimately fails when Julien and Kowalski wind up being consumed by it, but they are later expelled from it when Julien reaches down Kowalski's throat to retrieve a fish Kowalski had eaten for lunch to provoke the monstrous mass to release them. In the end, Kowalski uses his shrink ray to reduce Jiggles, but unbeknownst to the others, he keeps the miniaturized version.
46	46	"The Falcon and the Snow Job"	Brandon Sawyer	Tom Bernardo	February 6, 2010	125b	5.2
When Kitka, a female falcon, crashes at the zoo with a broken wing, a smitten Skipper insists that she stay to recuperate. Though she and Skipper soon hit it off, the other penguins fear that Kitka may want to eat some of the zoo animals, though Skipper rejects these charges. When Maurice later reports that Julien was taken by a falcon, all but Skipper lay the blame on Kitka as they set out to rescue him. Skipper's instincts prove correct, however, when it turns out a male falcon had taken Julien and Kitka was trying to save him. Despite this, Skipper breaks-up with Kitka afterward when she regurgitates Fred. Guest star: Kari Wahlgren as Kitka
47	47	"The Penguin Stays in the Picture"	Bill Motz & Bob Roth	Sean Kreiner	February 6, 2010	126a	5.2
Whenever the zoo's annual brochure cover photo is taken, Private is always selected for it. This year, however, the photographer is drawn to Mort instead. As Private expresses his displeasure, Bada (John DiMaggio) and Bing (Kevin Michael Richardson) overhear and offer to take Mort "out of the picture" for him, but Private rejects their proposition. The gorillas fail to take the hint, however, and when Mort goes missing, Private fears the worst and begins to see him as a ghost as the penguins begin to investigate. It is later revealed that Bada and Bing never hurt Mort, and had only hidden him away from the photographer. Relieved, Private graciously concedes the brochure cover to Mort.
48	48	"Dr. Blowhole's Revenge"	Bob Schooley & Mark McCorkle	Christo Stamboliev, Dave Knott and Dean Kelly; Johane Matte and Jay Shultz (additionals)	February 15, 2010 (Note: This episode was first released in Operation DVD Premiere on February 9, 2010.)	117	4.0
Bent on an agenda to punish the human race, the penguins' mad dolphin nemesis, Dr. Blowhole, kidnaps King Julien in an effort to lure the flightless force into a trap so that he can annihilate the team once and for all. It is then up to the penguins to spring the trap before Blowhole's plan to flood the Earth comes to fruition. Note: This aired as a 30-minute special episode and featured the first appearance of Dr. Blowhole, who was voiced by Neil Patrick Harris. Although this was the first appearance of Dr. Blowhole, he was mentioned in the episodes "Eclipsed" and "Roomies".

== DVD releases ==
The Penguins of Madagascar home video releases
Season	Episodes	Years active	Release dates
Season	Episodes	Years active	Region 1
1	48	2008–10	Operation: DVD Premiere: February 9, 2010; Episode(s): "Launchtime" • "Tangled in the Web" • "The Hidden" • "All Choked Up" • "Go Fish" • "Needle Point" • "Roomies" • "Dr. Blowhole's Revenge" Happy King Julien Day!: August 10, 2010; Episode(s): "Operation: Plush & Cover" • "Happy King Julien Day!" • "Assault & Batteries" • "Crown Fools" • "Kingdom Come" • "Jungle Law" • "All King, No Kingdom" New to the Zoo: August 10, 2010; Episode(s): "Skorca!" • "Cat's Cradle" • "Out of the Groove" • "Untouchable" • "Jiggles" I Was a Penguin Zombie: October 5, 2010; Episode(s): "Haunted Habitat" • "Eclipsed" • "Mort Unbound" • "Misfortune Cookie" • "Lemur See, Lemur Do" • "I Was a Penguin Zombie" All-Nighter Before Xmas: October 11, 2011; Episode(s): "Miracle on Ice" Operation: Blowhole: January 10, 2012; Episode(s): "Dr. Blowhole's Revenge" Operation: Get Ducky: February 14, 2012; Episode(s): "Paternal Egg-Stinct" • "Two Feet High and Rising" • "Otter Gone Wild" • "Sting Operation" Operation: Antarctica: October 30, 2012; Episode(s): "Penguiner Takes All" • "Roger Dodger" • "Snakehead!" • "The Falcon and the Snow Job" Operation: Special Delivery: November 4, 2014; Episode(s): "Mask of the Raccoon"
