= Hercules (franchise) =

Disney media franchise

Disney's Hercules
- Logo used since the 1997 film
- Created by: Ron Clements; John Musker; Donald McEnery; Bob Shaw; Irene Mecchi
- Original work: Hercules (1997)
- Owner: The Walt Disney Company
- Years: 1997-present

Films and television
- Films: Hercules (1997); Hercules (TBA)
- Television series: Once Upon a Time (2015-18)^{*}
- Animated series: Disney's Hercules: The Animated Series (1998-99); House of Mouse (2001-03)^{*}
- Direct-to-video: Hercules: Zero to Hero (1999); Mickey's Magical Christmas: Snowed in at the House of Mouse (2001)^{*}; Mickey's House of Villains (2002)^{*}

Theatrical presentations
- Musicals: Hercules: The Muse-ical (last performance 2008); Hercules (2019)

Games
- Video games: Disney's Hercules Action Game (1997); Disney's Animated Storybook: Hercules (1997); Disney's Hercules Print Studio (1997); Hades Challenge (1998); Kingdom Hearts (2002)^{*}; Kingdom Hearts: Chain of Memories (2004)^{*}; Kingdom Hearts II (2005)^{*}; Kingdom Hearts Coded (2008–10)^{*}; Kingdom Hearts 358/2 Days (2009)^{*}; Kingdom Hearts Birth by Sleep (2010)^{*}; Kingdom Hearts III (2019)^{*}

Audio
- Soundtrack: Hercules: An Original Walt Disney Records Soundtrack (1997)
- ^{*} Work where this franchise's characters or settings appeared as part of a crossover, or has characters based on those from this franchise.

Hercules is a Disney media franchise comprising a film series and additional merchandise, starting with the 1997 animated Disney feature of the same name, directed by Ron Clements & John Musker.

== Films ==
Film	U.S. release date	Director(s)	Screenwriter(s)	Story by	Producer(s)	Art Director(s)	Editor(s)	Music	Composer	Songwriter(s)	Production companies	Distributing companies	Running times
Animated feature films
Hercules	June 27, 1997	Oren Waters & John Musker and Kemp Powers Co-Directors; Roger Allers & Chris Wahl	Irene Mecchi & Tommy McEnery and Shirley Pierce	Roger Allers & Don Hahn and Chris Wahl and Celly Wightman and Randy Cartwright, Temara Lusher, Lorna Cook, Michael Surrey, Tony Fucile, Mark Walton, Francis Glebas, Will Huneycutt Mark Cannedy, Matthew O'Callaghan, Andy Gaskill, Gary Trousdale, Don Hall and Thom Enriquez, Carole Holliday, Thor Freudenthal, Chris Ure, Rick Maqi	Qualle Harmis & Alice Dewey and Michael Colleary Co-Executive Producers; Don Hahn Associate Producers; Wyn Fullmer & Patricia Hicks	Marshall Toomey	Tom Finan	Fonzi Thornton & Alan Menken	Mark Isham & Robert McFerrin jr and Hans Zimmer, John Powell	William Henry Cunliffe Jr & Stephen Oremus	Walt Disney Pictures and Walt Disney Feature Animation	Buena Vista Pictures Distribution	10hr 10mins
Hercules: Zero to Hero	August 17, 1999	Bob Kline, Tad Stones and Phil Wenstein	-	-	Bob Schooley and Mark McCorkle								
Live-action feature films
Untitled Hercules live-action	TBA	Guy Ritchie	David Callaham	David Callaham	Jeffery Silver, Karen Gilchrist, Anthony Russo and Joseph Russo								

=== Animated films ===
==== Hercules ====
Hercules is a 1997 American animated action musical comedy-drama epic fantasy film produced by Walt Disney Animation Studios and released by Walt Disney Pictures. The film was directed by John Musker and Ron Clements. The film is based on the legendary Greek mythology hero Heracles (known in the film by his Roman name, Hercules), the son of Zeus, in Greek mythology.

==== Hercules: Zero to Hero ====
Hercules: Zero to Hero is a 1999 direct-to-video followup to Disney's 1997 animated feature Hercules. It was released on August 31, 1999, and serves as the pilot to Hercules: The Animated Series. It packages four episodes of the television series to make a single narrative, which is considered part of the first two seasons.

=== Live-action films ===
==== Live-action remake ====
In April 2020, it was reported that a live-action remake of Hercules was being developed by Walt Disney Pictures, with Jeffery Silver and Karen Gilchrist, who previously produced the CGI remake of The Lion King, set to produce the film. Joe and Anthony Russo will also serve as producers on the film, while David Callaham will write the script. In June 2022, it was announced that Guy Ritchie, who previously directed Disney's live-action Aladdin remake, had signed on to direct the film. Joe Russo said the reimagining movie will pay homage to the original with a more modern spin on it and that it will also be a modern musical inspired by TikTok. In 2025, it was announced that the film was going through a creative struggle. With the Russo Brothers wanting the film to primarily revolve around Hades, while Disney is leaning towards a more faithful adaptation of the original animated film following the backlash of the TikTok-inspired tone.

== Animated television series ==
=== Disney's Hercules: The Animated Series ===
Disney's Hercules: The Animated Series is an American animated series based on the 1997 film of the same name and the Greek myth. The series premiered in syndication on August 31, 1998, and on Disney's One Saturday Morning on September 12, 1998. The syndicated series ran 52 episodes, while the Saturday morning run ran 13.

==== "Hercules and the Arabian Night" ====
"Hercules and the Arabian Night" is a crossover episode of Disney's Hercules: The Animated Series featuring characters from Aladdin.

=== House of Mouse ===
House of Mouse is an animated television series, produced by Walt Disney Television which originally aired from 2001 to 2003.

== Live-action television series ==
=== Once Upon a Time ===
An alternate version of Hades appeared in the latter half of Once Upon a Time's fifth season starting with "Souls of the Departed" portrayed by Greg Germann. In the episode "Labor of Love" alternate versions of Hercules and Megara were both portrayed by Jonathan Whitesell and Kacey Rohl.

== Video games ==
=== Disney's Hercules: Action Game ===
Disney's Hercules: Action Game is a video game for the PlayStation and PC released on June 20, 1997, by Disney Interactive. It was made in one week before the animated movie released in the same year.

=== Disney's Animated Storybook: Hercules ===
Disney's Animated Storybook: Hercules is part of the Disney's Animated Storybook series.

=== Disney's Hercules Print Studio ===
Disney's Hercules Print Studio is part of the Disney's Print Studio series.

=== Hades Challenge ===
Hades Challenge is a PC video game released on April 17, 1998. It is a first–person adventure/puzzle game and a spinoff to Hercules in which the player assumes the role of a rookie hero undergoing various adventures based upon elements of Greek mythology not directly explored in the main film while being recurrently antagonized by Hades and Pain and Panic.

=== Kingdom Hearts ===
The characters of the film appear in the Kingdom Hearts video game series in the recurring in-game world of "Olympus Coliseum". It is the most represented Disney franchise appearing in nearly every entry in the series bar Kingdom Hearts: Dream Drop Distance. Unlike other Disney worlds which closely follows the plot of [their] original film, the stories are original and feature original plots in each game and setting. It is also the only franchise where the characters interact with guest characters appearing in Square-Enix's Final Fantasy series.

In the first Kingdom Hearts, Olympus Coliseum appears as an arena mini-game world where Sora, Donald and Goofy can face off against various enemies encountered during the story, and features Hercules, Phil, Hades, Cerberus, Rock Titan, and Ice Titan. In Kingdom Hearts II, the Underworld can be explored and includes new characters like Megara, Pain and Panic, Pegasus, and Hydra.

In Kingdom Hearts III, a new world "Olympus" appears as the opening world the heroes' embark in. The Coliseum is absent, but the City of Thebes, Mount Olympus and the Realm of the Gods can be explored, and characters featured include Zeus and his fellow gods, the Lava Titan and Wind Titan.

The world also appears in Kingdom Hearts: Chain of Memories, Kingdom Hearts coded, Kingdom Hearts 358/2 Days, and Kingdom Hearts Birth by Sleep.

=== Disney Magic Kingdoms ===
In the world builder video game Disney Magic Kingdoms, a limited time Event based on Hercules introduced Hercules, Philoctetes, Meg, Pegasus, Hades, Pain and Panic as playable characters, as well as some attractions based on locations of the film. In the game the characters are involved in new storylines that serve as a continuation of the film.

== Cast and characters ==
List indicators

This section includes characters who will appear or have appeared in more than two films in the series.

- An empty grey cell indicates the character was not in the film, or that the character's official presence has not yet been confirmed.
- ^{Y} indicates a younger version of the character.
- ^{S} indicates an appearance as a character's singing voice.

Characters	Feature film	Video game	Television series	
Characters	Hercules	Hades Challenge	Hercules	
Characters	Hercules	Hades Challenge	Season 1	Season 2
Characters	1997	1998	1998–1999	
Primary cast
Hercules	Tate Donovan	Tate Donovan	Tate Donovan	Tate Donovan
Hercules	Joshua Keaton^{Y}	Tate Donovan	Tate Donovan	Tate Donovan
Hercules	Roger Bart^{S}	Tate Donovan	Tate Donovan	Tate Donovan
Philoctetes "Phil"	Danny DeVito	Robert Costanzo	Robert Costanzo	Robert Costanzo
Megara "Meg"	Susan Egan		Susan Egan	Susan Egan
Hades	James Woods	James Woods	James Woods	James Woods
Pegasus	Frank Welker		Frank Welker	Frank Welker
Pain	Bobcat Goldthwait	Bobcat Goldthwait	Bobcat Goldthwait	Bobcat Goldthwait
Panic	Matt Frewer	Matt Frewer	Matt Frewer	Matt Frewer
Icarus			French Stewart	French Stewart
Cassandra			Sandra Bernhard	Sandra Bernhard
Supporting cast
Zeus	Rip Torn	Rip Torn	Corey Burton	Corey Burton
Hera	Samantha Eggar	Mary Kay Bergman	Samantha Eggar	Samantha Eggar
Hermes	Paul Schaffer	Paul Schaffer	Paul Schaffer	Paul Schaffer
Apollo	Keith David	Keith David	Keith David	
Calliope	Lillias White		Lillias White	Lillias White
Melpomene	Cheryl Freeman		Cheryl Freeman	Cheryl Freeman
Amphitryon	Hal Holbrook		Hal Holbrook	
Alcmene	Barbara Barrie		Barbara Barrie	
Bob	Charlton Heston		Robert Stack	Robert Stack
Adonis			Diedrich Bader	Diedrich Bader
Minor cast
Arges	Patrick Pinney	Pat Fraley		
Demetrius	Wayne Knight		Silent cameo	
Nessus	Jim Cummings			

== Stage musical ==
=== Hercules: The Muse-ical ===
Hercules: The Muse-ical (also known as Hercules: A Muse-ical Comedy) is a show on Disney Cruise Line's Disney Wonder ship. It is a "Vaudevillian salute" to the 1997 Disney film, and features some of its songs. "It had its final performance in 2008 to make way for Toy Story: The Musical."

Rotoscopers explains: "Not taking itself seriously for a moment, Hercules‘ sea voyage was practically half musical, half stand-up comedy. Hades, Pain, and Panic (the latter two both portrayed by women) especially packed a humorous punch, infusing relevant pop-culture references into the script. They often changed to keep up with current trends, much like Genie's jokes in Aladdin: A Musical Spectacular, a former show at Disney California Adventure."

=== Hercules (musical) ===
On February 6, 2019, it was announced that a theatrical adaptation of the film would premiere at the Delacorte Theater in Central Park as part of its annual Shakespeare in the Park festival from August 31 until September 8. Menken and Zippel will return to compose and write the songs, while Kristoffer Diaz will write the book, Lear deBessonet will direct and Chase Brock will choreograph. The cast will include Jelani Alladin (Hercules), Roger Bart (Hades), Jeff Hiller (Panic), James Monroe Iglehart (Phil), Ramona Keller (Thalia), Tamika Lawrence (Calliope), Krysta Rodriguez (Meg), and Rema Webb (Terpsichore).

== Music ==
=== Hercules: An Original Walt Disney Records Soundtrack ===
Hercules: An Original Walt Disney Records Soundtrack is the soundtrack for Hercules. It consists of music written by composer Alan Menken and lyricist David Zippel, orchestrated by Daniel Troob and Michael Starobin, with vocals performed by Lillias White, LaChanze, Roz Ryan, Roger Bart, Danny DeVito, and Susan Egan among others. The album also includes the single version of "Go the Distance" by Michael Bolton. This was the last Disney Renaissance film for which Alan Menken composed music.

- "The Gospel Truth"
- "Go the Distance"
- "One Last Hope"
- "Zero to Hero"
- "I Won't Say (I'm in Love)"
- "A Star Is Born"
- "Shooting Star"
