= List of Hercules (1998 TV series) episodes =

The following is a list of episodes from Hercules, an American animated television series made by Walt Disney Television Animation, based on the 1997 Disney animated feature film of the same name and Greek mythology.

All major voice actors from the 1997 film reprise their roles, except for Zeus and Philoctetes, who are respectively voiced by Corey Burton and Robert Costanzo. The series ran for 65 episodes, with 52 having aired in syndication and 13 more having aired on ABC as part of the Disney's One Saturday Morning block. The syndicated and ABC episodes constituted a single production season, but they are listed separately here. A direct-to-video film, Hercules: Zero to Hero, was released in 1999 and reformatted four episodes of the series.

One episode, titled "Hercules and the Arabian Night", serves as a crossover with Disney's Aladdin.

== Series overview ==
Season	Episodes	Originally released		
Season	Episodes	First released	Last released	Network
1	52	August 31, 1998	March 1, 1999	Syndication
2	13	September 12, 1998	January 16, 1999	ABC

== Episodes ==
=== Syndication (1998–99) ===
What follows is the list of Hercules episodes that aired in syndication.

No.	Title	Directed by	Written by	Storyboard by	Original release date	Prod. code
1	"Hercules and the Apollo Mission"	Phil Weinstein	Michael Price	Craig Kemplin & Rebecca Shen	August 31, 1998	4347-017
After being given a job he feels is worthless at the Gyro Shop, Zeus (Corey Burton) gives Hercules (Tate Donovan) a job working for Apollo (Keith David) driving his sun chariot. However, Hades (James Woods) sends Pain (Bobcat Goldthwait) and Panic (Matt Frewer) to unchain the sun from its chariot, bringing it to the Underworld and leaving Earth in darkness, causing panic and rioting. Now Hercules and Icarus (French Stewart) must get the sun back into the sky before Hades is voted the new king of Olympus.
2	"Hercules and the King of Thessaly"	Phil Weinstein	Eddie Guzelian	Sean Bishop & Lonnie Lloyd	September 1, 1998	4347-005
One day, King Salmoneus (Jeffrey Tambor) impersonates Zeus, who smites him for his gall. The people of Thessaly turn to Hercules for leadership and crown him as their new king. Hercules initially enjoys his new position, but when the people come to him with their minor troubles, he has second thoughts and tries to leave. However, Zeus and Hera (Samantha Eggar) remind him how proud they are of him and Hercules reluctantly stays. When Pain and Panic mistakenly try to take Salmoneus to the Underworld, he blackmails them into restoring him to the throne in exchange for not telling Hades. They attempt to take Hercules on as a lion in a battle that almost destroys the city. In the end, Hercules forces the people of Thessaly to make their own decisions, creating a democracy. Hades, meanwhile, discovers Pain and Panic's mistake and teaches them a painful lesson.
3	"Hercules and the Secret Weapon"	Bob Kline	Jan Strnad	Ryan Anthony, Todd Britton, Shawna Cha, Sharon Forward & Justin Thompson	September 2, 1998	4347-007
Hephaestus (Kevin Michael Richardson) has built a secret weapon for Ares (Jay Thomas), a bow that produces energy arrows. After learning of this, Athena (Jane Leeves), Ares's long-time rival, sends Hercules and Philoctetes (Robert Costanzo) to investigate. In Sparta, Hercules unwittingly accepts a mission from Ares to destroy Athens using the Armageddon Bow (Paula Poundstone), which turns out to be sentient and does not like to kill. After Icarus and Cassandra (Sandra Bernhard) blurt out Hercules' mission for Athena, Ares decides to kill them. Athena comes to their aid, and while the two deities argue over who should get the bow, Hercules decides to drop it and let whoever catches it have it. This turns out to be Cupid.
4	"Hercules and the Assassin"	Phil Weinstein	Eddie Guzelian	Nicholas Filippi, Garrett Ho & Todd Britton	September 3, 1998	4347-002
Hercules meets Amazonian warrior Tempest (Jennifer Jason Leigh), and steals one of Phil's spears in an attempt to impress her. He then throws the spear, which nearly kills Pericles (Earl Hindman), governor of Athens. Pericles has had several assassination attempts made against him by Minister Cleon (Gilbert Gottfried), who is working for Ares. Chipacles (Mike Connors), chief of Athens security, vows to find the assassin. The discovery of the spear leads Chipacles to believe that Phil is the assassin, resulting in his arrest. While Icarus and Cassandra plead Phil's case, Hercules teams up with Tempest to catch the true assassin. Phil is still sentenced to death, but Cleon is exposed to be plotting with Ares. Angry at discovering Ares' activities, Athena gives Hercules the one weapon he chooses to defeat Cleon with - his hero-training spear.
5	"Hercules and the Big Kiss"	Eddy Houchins	Jess Winfield	Jill Colbert Trousdale, Chris Rutkowski, Shawna Cha & Leonardo Pinero	September 4, 1998	4347-027
Cassandra is worried about a prophecy in which she kisses Icarus and is witnessed by gods and goddesses. Hercules promises to do what he can. However, his efforts to stop Icarus further arouse the latter's emotions. Desperate, Cassandra makes a deal with Hades who wants her advice about his romantic future regarding Aphrodite. Cassandra agrees that he can have her soul after school and on weekends if he stops Icarus from kissing her, so Hades sends Pain and Panic plus the serpentine Doubt, into action. Meanwhile, Hercules appeals to Aphrodite (Lisa Kudrow), the goddess of love, who gives him arrows to shoot at Cassandra to make her fall in love with Icarus. When Icarus is struck by doubt, Hades puts him in an eternal sleep, and Cassandra reluctantly kisses him to wake him. Aphrodite rejects Hades' advances, reminding him of her fiancé, Hephaestus, who confronts him.
6	"Hercules and the River Styx"	Bob Kline	Jess Winfield	Phillip Mosness, Debra Pugh & Denise Koyama	September 7, 1998	4347-016
Hercules, after failing several times in Shop Class with Icarus's father, Daedalus (David Hyde Pierce), becomes fed up and quits, calling it useless. This insults Icarus. Meanwhile, Hades allies with his brother Poseidon (Jason Alexander) to move the River Styx from the edge of Hades's domain to include Greece. With the river moved, Hades punishes the heroes with what they hate most, which for Hercules is Shop Class. Now, Hades rules Greece, the Underworld, and the Seas. To stop him and physically reroute the river, Hercules must use Daedalus's teachings.
7	"Hercules and the Techno Greeks"	Eddy Houchins	Jim Bernstein & Michael Shipley	Chris Rutkowski, Jill Colbert Trousdale, Denise Koyama & Joe Horne	September 8, 1998	4347-009
Bored with poetry class, Tempest applies for a job to protect the city-state of the Techno Greeks, which is attacked by centaurs every Friday. However, after Hercules defeats the centaurs and volunteers to protect them for free, Tempest is out of a job. Angry, she defeats the centaur leader Blowtox (Clancy Brown) and becomes their leader. Hercules encounters the dejected Blowtox and offers him training in fighting and strategy. Tempest, now the centaurs' leader, launches an attack on Monday, but Blowtox defeats her using his newfound skills, and the centaurs become the city-state's new security force.
8	"Hercules and the World's First Doctor"	Phil Weinstein	Michael Price	Gary Graham & Rossen Varbanov	September 9, 1998	4347-003
Hippocrates (Mandy Patinkin) has become the world's first doctor, saving lives and decreasing the number of spirit arrivals in the Underworld. Hercules joins him in his efforts as doctor, although Phil feels rejected. Hades sends Pain and Panic to dispose of Hippocrates, but they fail, so he dupes Hercules into spreading a plague. However, Hippocrates creates a cure using various plants and items from around the world. Frustrated, Hades uses the last of the plague to kill Hippocrates. Hercules convinces Phil to travel with him to the Underworld and save Hippocrates, with Phil bribing Charon (John Kassir) to let them in. They find Hippocrates raising the dead, much to Hades's ire, so he asks Hercules to take Hippocrates back, suggesting that he take Wednesdays off to play golf.
9	"Hercules and the Pool Party"	Bob Kline	Ken Koonce & Michael Merton	Shawna Cha, Wendell Washer, Rossen Varbanov & Carin-Anne Greco	September 10, 1998	4347-024
Hades invites all the gods except Trivia (Ben Stein) to a pool party in the Underworld where they swim in the Pool of Forgetfulness. This gives them amnesia, causing chaos in the world above. After learning of Hades's plan, Trivia deduces that sweating out the water will reverse the effect, and he takes them to the heat of Hephaestus's volcano. Meanwhile, Pain and Panic accidentally lock the gates of Olympus so Hades has Hephaestus try to open them. Hercules arrives and fights Hephaestus, inadvertently opening the gates, but Trivia stops Hades before he can enter. When the gods arrive with their memories restored, Hades retreats.
10	"Hercules and the Prince of Thrace"	Phil Weinstein	Madellaine Paxson, Bill Motz & Bob Roth	Todd Britton, Craig Kemplin, Chris Rutkowski & Rebecca Shen	September 11, 1998	4347-028
After Adonis (Diedrich Bader) disturbs Gaia (Kerri Kenney), she places a curse on him. Adonis persuades Hercules and Pegasus to fly him to the oracle at Delphi, who tells him that the curse can only be removed by the Golden Apples in the garden of the Hesperides. To find the garden's location they are referred to the elder shapeshifter Nereus (Jim Cummings), who battles Hercules; after he is defeated, Nereus reveals the garden is located at the end of the world and that only a god can take the apples. Adonis convinces Hercules to get them, but he fails because he is only a demigod. They ask Atlas (Thomas Lennon) to retrieve the apples while Hercules holds up the sky. Despite being given a chance to abandon Hercules, Adonis tricks Atlas into holding up the sky again. The pair summon Gaia to the garden and offer her the apples which appeases her wrath so she lifts the curse from Adonis.
11	"Hercules and the Tapestry of Fate"	Eddy Houchins	Brian Swenlin	Fred Gonzales, Robert Onorato & Martin Warner	September 14, 1998	4347-030
Hercules and Icarus want to attend an Orpheus concert, but they find it has sold out. They seek help from Zeus but he cannot interfere, so they approach the Fates: Atropos (Paddi Edwards), Clotho (Tress MacNeille) and Lachesis (Carole Shelley). Hercules distracts the Fates while Icarus re-weaves the Tapestry of Fate while avoiding Arachne (Vicki Lewis), a spider lady and the guardian of the Tapestry and he creates tickets for the concert. This gives Hades the idea to re-weave his fate, making himself king of the gods, Phil a janitor, Icarus a successful inventor, Hercules a god and the son of Hades, and Zeus ruler of the Underworld and guardian of the Tapestry. Hercules ultimately destroys the Tapestry and weaves it back to normal; as a reward, the Fates give them tickets, only to discover that the concert has been canceled.
12	"Hercules and the Living Legend"	Phil Weinstein	Richard Stanley	Sean Bishop & Wendy Grieb	September 15, 1998	4347-031
Hades realizes that Phil is the key to Hercules's success in training to become a hero and hatches a scheme to separate them. Hades offers the washed-out has-been, Achilles (Dom Irrera), his youthful body and strength in return for taking Phil back as his trainer. After Achilles defeats the monster Memnon (David Alan Grier) in a fixed fight, Phil sees a great career opportunity in coaching the former hero, leaving Hercules on his own. However, Phil misses Hercules and they reunite after Hercules saves the citizens of Arcadia from a fire. Hades returns Achilles to his old body and sends Memnon to attack Hercules and Phil on the training field, but when Hercules is knocked out, Achilles steps in to defeat the monster. Achilles recalls what it means to be a true hero and leaves to deal with a flood in Arcadia, ironically caused by Hercules when he extinguished the fire.
13	"Hercules and the Return of Typhon"	Bob Kline	Ken Koonce & Michael Merton	Jill Colbert Trousdale, Wendell Washer, Sharon Forward, Denise Koyama & Alan Wright	September 16, 1998	4347-042
Zeus invites Hercules to throw the first lightning bolt for Titan Smitin' Day, an event commemorating Zeus' past defeat of the Titan Typhon (Regis Philbin). However, Hercules throws the bolt badly, accidentally destroying part of the city. Meanwhile, Typhon's mate, Echidna (Kathie Lee Gifford), seeks revenge for her husband by wreaking havoc on Athens. To prove his worth to Zeus, Hercules challenges her, but he inadvertently releases Typhon. Hercules calls on Zeus for help and the god confronts Typhon, but they are evenly matched until Hera throws a lightning bolt which forces Echidna and Typhon to end the battle. Hera and Zeus then explain that it was Hera who threw the bolt in the original battle to buy time for Zeus to defeat Typhon. Father and son mutually agree that even a god isn't perfect.
14	"Hercules and the Owl of Athens"	Eddy Houchins	John Behnke, Rob Humphrey, & Jim Peterson	Carin-Anne Greco, Amber Tornquist & Alan Wright	September 17, 1998	4347-025
Athena plays a practical joke on Ares by shaving his dogs of war to look like poodles. To exact his revenge, Ares sends his dimwitted sons, Fear (David Cross) and Terror (Toby Russ), to kidnap her precious Owl of Wisdom, Ibid. Meanwhile, Athena entrusts the bird to Hercules for safekeeping, which works out nicely for Hercules, as it is mid-term exam time and the owl grants intelligence to whoever possesses it. However, Fear and Terror manage to steal Ibid and use their new intelligence to bind Ares and Athena in chains. The brothers then challenge Hercules to a game of wits based on Greek history to win the bird back. Hercules wins, and in the process learns a valuable lesson in acquiring knowledge for its own sake.
15	"Hercules and the Girdle of Hippolyte"	Eddy Houchins	Mirith JS Colao	Shawna Cha, Leonardo Pinero & Fred Gonzales	September 18, 1998	4347-045
Tempest's mother, Queen Hippolyte (Jane Curtin) thinks that her daughter is going soft and takes her back from Prometheus High to the Isle of the Amazons. Misunderstanding the situation, Hercules follows her in a misguided attempt at a rescue. The queen expects Tempest to go through a savage initiation ceremony by spending the night in the wilderness to regain her status as a warrior and to earn the right to wear the Golden Girdle armor. Hercules and Tempest wind up learning to rely on each other's strengths as they face the challenges of the wilderness together.
16	"Hercules and the Bacchanal"	Eddy Houchins	Mirith JS Colao	Carin-Anne Greco, Amber Tornquist, Lonnie Lloyd, Sharon Forward & Alan Wright	September 21, 1998	4347-015
Phil wants to go to the Brotherhood of Satyrs, Minotaurs, and Other Half-Humans Convention, so Hercules and Hermes volunteer to watch the island over the weekend. However, Hermes is miffed after Adonis decides to throw a party without inviting Hercules and his friends, and he convinces Bacchus (Dom DeLuise) to throw a Bacchanal on Phil's island. The loud party wakes Poseidon who sinks the island and refuses to raise it again unless he gets some eye cream from Argus (Harvey Fierstein). Argus agrees, but in return, he wants a love arrow from Cupid (Tom Arnold), who wants some water from the Pool of Forgetfulness. While retrieving the water, Hercules and Hermes are caught by Pain and Panic, who want flameproof pants. To get the pants, Hermes intends to call in a favor from Hephaestus, but he is a guest speaker at the convention. While seeking out Hephaestus, Hercules runs into Phil and explains what happened to the island. Meanwhile, Hermes gets the pants from Hephaestus and sets everything right so Poseidon can restore the island. Herc comes clean anyway to Phil about what happened -- this upsets Hermes, but Phil is proud of Herc for being honest.
17	"Hercules and the Underworld Takeover"	Bob Kline	Story by : David Hemingson and Eddie Guzelian; Written by : Gary Sperling	Rich Chidlaw, Llyn Hunter & Alan Wright	September 23, 1998	4347-020
The shepherd Amphitryon (Hal Holbrook) injures his ankle and asks Hercules to mind his sheep while Hecate (Peri Gilpin), demigoddess of magic and night, plots to take over the Underworld. During a council of the gods on Mount Olympus she seals some of Hades's flame in a magic crystal which slowly drains away his godly essence as it grows larger. Hecate takes over the Underworld and ousts Pain and Panic who turn to Hercules for help, arguing that Hecate is worse than Hades. Hercules agrees to help them if they promise to watch Amphitryon's sheep and surprisingly, Pain and Panic become attached to a sheep who is about to give birth. Meanwhile, Hercules contends with Hecate and destroys the crystal, restoring Hades's power and he blasts Hecate off his throne. Later, Amphitryon hires Pain and Panic as his new sheep-sitters.
18	"Hercules and the Comedy of Arrows"	Eddy Houchins	Laura McCreary	Fred Gonzales & Robert Onorato	September 29, 1998	TBA
Hades is frustrated with love blossoming each spring and causing longer life, so he sends Pain and Panic to infiltrate Cupid's headquarters. They encounter Icarus who has joined the cherubs and wants to get rid of Cassandra's new boyfriend, Melampus (Ethan Embry). However, Icarus's jealous attitude causes him to produce loathe arrows. Hades uses these to his advantage by capturing the cherubs and having Pain and Panic firing the arrows at everyone causing them to hate each other. Hercules and Icarus team up with Cupid to "put passion back in fashion", and free the cupids who cause Hades to become warm and loving. Icarus then has the chance to shoot the love arrow at Cassandra, but he resists as this would prevent her from knowing her feelings for him.
19	"Hercules and the Hostage Crisis"	Bob Kline	Jess Winfield	Denise Koyama, Debra Pugh & Fred Gonzales	October 2, 1998	4347-044
A terrorist group called the People's Organization of Titanic Liberators (POOTLS) who worship the Titans are led by the half-Titan Antaeus (Miguel Ferrer) and take over Prometheus High. They capture Hercules and demand that Zeus free the Titans. Fearing for his son, Zeus prepares to free the Titans, but Hercules and his guidance counselor, Mr. Parenthesis (Eric Idle) manage to escape. Combining brains with brawn, they defeat Antaeus and bring the villains to justice.
20	"Hercules and the Disappearing Heroes"	Phil Weinstein	Robert Cohen	Craig Kemplin, Chris Rutkowski, & Gilbert Weems, Jr.	October 5, 1998	4347-043
Hecate tries to take over the Underworld again and steals the eyesight of Nestor (Jim Belushi), the hearing of Meleager (Nicholas Turturro) and the toughness of police chief Mentor (Ed Asner), transferring them into a monster she created. When Chipacles vows to find Mentor, Hercules and Phil inform him that Hecate is behind the abduction. Chipacles decides to help them but they are unable to stop Hecate from capturing Odysseus (Steven Weber) for his cunning. However, Hecate's creature lacks strength, so they lure her to the Merv Griffin show where Hercules is displaying his strength, but she captures him as well. While Hecate heads to the Underworld with her more powerful creature, Phil and Chipacles release the heroes who use their knowledge of their weaknesses to slow the monster until Hades returns. Hercules forces Hecate to return the heroes' powers by threatening to expose her plan to Hades, who gives her a statuette of himself in mock appreciation of her dedication.
21	"Hercules and the Argonauts"	Bob Kline	Michael Medlock	Jill Colbert Trousdale & Wendell Washer	October 8, 1998	4347-046
Hercules is becoming frustrated with the need for constant training to become a hero, so Phil introduces him to the Argonaut Jason (William Shatner), a seafaring hero who has spent thirty years searching for the Golden Fleece. Jason invites Hercules to join him in his quest aboard the Argo where he meets the crew: rigger Lynceus, helmsman Tiphys (Larry Miller), and bee-keeper Butes (Steven Wright). Jason decides to sail through the Symplegades and lets Hercules steer the ship through treacherous shoals. However, the inexperienced Hercules crashes the ship on an island inhabited by Sirens and the sailor-eating monster Gegeneis (Brad Garrett). While the crew is captured, Hercules and Jason find the Golden Fleece, and while it does not live up to Jason's high expectations, it proves to be useful in rescuing the crew and returning them to Greece, where Hercules vows to continue his training.
22	"Hercules and the Drama Festival"	Eddy Houchins	Jon Weisman	Shawna Cha, Leonardo Pinero & Daniel Mills	October 14, 1998	4347-026
Pain and Panic show Hades the Cronus Stone that Cronus coughed up when he spat out the gods, which can induce eternal sleep. Hades has Pain and Panic carve it into a mask which he dupes Icarus into wearing in a portrayal of Hades at the upcoming Drama Festival dedicated to Mnemosyne. The gods will be attending and Hades plans to put them to sleep and take over Olympus. When Hercules discovers that Icarus has been visiting Hades in the Underworld to get into character, he grows suspicious, especially when the gods start falling asleep and he sees Pain and Panic at the festival. Hercules soon realizes that the mask is made from the Cronus Stone, and he persuades Icarus to take it off, reviving the gods. Hercules tosses the mask away, striking Hades in the distance and causing him to take out his anger on Pain and Panic.
23	"Hercules and the Phil Factor"	Phil Weinstein	Marcy Brown & Dennis Haley	Garrett Ho & Nicholas Filippi	October 16, 1998	4347-051
Phil is discouraged after his rival hero trainer Chiron (Kevin Michael Richardson) points out that Phil has never actually been a hero, and therefore cannot train them. Suffering from a mid-life crisis, Phil tries to become a hero with support from Hercules, but has no luck. Phil quits his job as Hercules's trainer and joins the family spear-selling business, also with little luck. But when Hercules must save the city of Corinth from the bronze bull Catoblepas, he needs his old trainer's help to defeat it. Phil teaches Hercules hands-on sensory deprivation training, relying on the four senses besides sight as the bull's eyes can render a person unconscious. With Phil's direction, Hercules defeats the bronze bull by driving it into the water where it sinks to the bottom. Hercules then proclaims Phil as a hero as he could not have won without him.
24	"Hercules and the All Nighter"	Eddy Houchins	Laura McCreary	Carin-Anne Greco & Amber Tornquist	October 21, 1998	4347-048
Hercules and Icarus have not studied enough for their final exams, so on Cassandra's sardonic suggestion they approach Morpheus (Jonathan Katz), the god of sleep, (Note: The Greek sleep god is Hypnos.) to ask if he will take a week off. He refuses, but Hercules accidentally pulls Morpheus's sleep blanket over him, putting him to sleep and preventing sleep across the world. Hercules and Icarus use this time to study but fail to notice people acting strangely due to lack of sleep. The Netherworld has a great influx due to increasing accidents by sleep-deprived people and Hades intends to keep it that way, so he has Pain and Panic guard Morpheus. To rectify the situation and wake the god, Hercules set off to find the rooster Alectryon (Steve Hytner), a former hero who Morpheus caused to fall asleep on guard duty. As dawn approaches, Hades unsuccessfully tries to barter with Alectryon, who crows and wakes Morpheus. Hades is forced to give up the souls that died due to lack of sleep while, as punishment for their actions, Hercules and Icarus must fly across the night sky spreading sleep.
25	"Hercules and the Song of Circe"	Phil Weinstein	Michael Price	Craig Kemplin & Chris Rutkowski	October 29, 1998	4347-021
During spring break, Cassandra becomes fed up with Icarus's persistent claims to be her boyfriend and she rejects him in front of the other students. The beautiful sorceress Circe (Idina Menzel) then arrives on the beach and soon all the guys are competing for her attention. Surprisingly, she chooses Icarus who is infatuated with her, but she soon becomes bored with him and turns him into a platypus when she reaches her island. Hercules and Adonis are also smitten and go to visit her, but she also turns them into animals, a lemur and a peacock respectively. Meanwhile, Cassandra admits to Helen of Troy (Jodi Benson) that she misses Icarus and then has a vision where she sees her friends in trouble. Cassandra and Helen go to rescue the boys and she defeats Circe, breaking her magic staff. Cassandra still does not acknowledge Icarus as a boyfriend but accepts him as a good friend. Meanwhile, Circe teaches Helen how to turn Adonis back to normal, but she leaves him as a peacock to teach him a lesson about looking at other women.
26	"Hercules and the Trojan War"	Eddy Houchins	Story by : Bruce Reid Schaefer; Written by : Bill Motz & Bob Roth	Robert Onorato, Ryan Anthony & Sharon Forward	October 30, 1998	4347-037
Hercules tells Homer (Dan Castellaneta) about the rivalry between the students of the Athens Prometheus Academy and Trojan Academy, and how the situation got out of hand after a mindless prank. Helen, the Homecoming Queen, tried to end the conflict and ended up with Paris (Cary Elwes) in Troy. The students decided to rescue her by sneaking into the Trojan school in a wooden horse, courtesy of Icarus. Their plot failed when Paris called on Otus, the son of Poseidon, who knocked Hercules unconscious. The students managed to escape in the steam-powered horse although it crashed because it had no brakes. While plotting another rescue back at the Prometheus Academy, Helen appears and reveals that she was not captured, but merely went to resolve the situation with Paris. Homer feels that the story lacks drama, so he decides to make it juicier by turning it into an epic, the Trojan War.
27	"Hercules and the Dream Date"	Eddy Houchins	Bill Motz & Bob Roth	Carin-Anne Greco & Amber Tornquist	November 2, 1998	4347-019
Hercules is unable to find a date for the upcoming Aphrodesia Dance. Inspired by Pygmalion (Calvert DeForest), he sculpts a statue of a young woman and pleads with Aphrodite to bring it to life and be "crazy about him". She reluctantly agrees, naming the young woman Galatea (Jennifer Aniston). However, Galatea becomes increasingly obsessed with Hercules and will do anything to be with him. After Galatea is killed in a fire, Aphrodite revives her and gives her free will, resulting in her losing interest in Hercules.
28	"Hercules and the Big Games"	Bob Kline	Robert Askin, Richard Liebmann-Smith & Jess Winfield	Denise Koyama & Debra Pugh	November 4, 1998	4347-052
Due to a reduction in new souls arriving in the Underworld, Hades convinces Ares to start a war between Sparta and Athens. However, Zeus refuses to sanction the war as the Big Games between Spartan Military High and the Athenian Prometheus Academy are about to take place in Athens and Hercules is on the Athenian team. Instead, Zeus decrees that the games will decide the superior city-state. At a loss, Hades invites Echidna and her family attack the arena and feast on the humans. Meanwhile, Hercules is winning all the events and enjoying being a sports hero until Ares recalls that Hercules is a demigod and he is disqualified. When Echidna and her family arrive, Hercules puts aside his sporting popularity to save the day, with an assist from Ares and Athena, who work together for once to save their people from being eaten.
29	"Hercules and the Jilt Trip"	Bob Kline	Mirith JS Colao	Rich Chidlaw & Llyn Hunter	November 6, 1998	4347-049
Hercules is feeling down after his girlfriend Anaxarete (Cree Summer) of three days broke up with him so Phil convinces him to help out a neighboring kingdom. While there, Phil tries to set Hercules up with Princess Lavinia (Cheri Oteri) by encouraging her to take the initiative. However, the city is attacked by the monster Geryon (Will Ferrell). Hercules challenges Geryon but after a short battle, Geryon runs away. Hercules pursues Geryon to fight him again, but after learning that the Princess is his girlfriend, Hercules convinces him to tell her how he feels and apologize to the King (Val Bettin). However, when Lavinia explains that she intends to marry Hercules, Geryon attacks Hercules, but she convinces Geryon not to kill him. Later, Hercules tells Lavinia that they are not suited for each other, and he successfully suggests that she go back to Geryon.
30	"Hercules and the Falling Stars"	Eddy Houchins	Jess Winfield	Ryan Anthony, Shawna Cha, Leonardo Pinero & Rebecca Shen	November 10, 1998	4347-054
Hercules needs help with his archery and calls on the hunter Orion (Craig Ferguson), releasing him from his constellation. The gruff Orion is not accustomed to the calm way people live, disregarding common courtesies and earning Hercules's respect, but angering Phil and everyone else. The hole Hercules tore in the sky enables the constellations Scorpio, Taurus, Leo and Aries constellations to escape. After Artemis (Reba McEntire) discovers a giant crater, she realizes Orion is responsible, and sets out to find him. Meanwhile, Orion is busy with Hercules fighting the other constellations, destroying Corinth, Sparta, Abacus Valley, and Athens in the process. Artemis finally catches up to the duo, revealing that Orion is her ex-boyfriend. After the other constellations are defeated, she forces the duo to rebuild the cities and insists that Orion return to his place in the sky, as he suggests that Hercules may one day have a constellation of his own.
31	"Hercules and the Golden Touch"	Phil Weinstein	Jon Weisman	Nicholas Filippi & Garrett Ho	November 12, 1998	4347-056
In a parody of James Bond, Epsilon (Craig Ferguson) hires Hercules to become a secret agent and bring down King Midas (Eugene Levy). Epsilon alleges that the greedy king is abusing the power granted by Bacchus to turn everything into gold with his touch. Hercules investigates and is caught so he calls on Hermes to help, but it is a trap set by Midas to obtain Hermes's sandals to travel the world, turning objects into gold. Using special devices provided by Icarus, Hermes escapes and goes after Midas with the king's daughter, Marigold (Tia Carrere). Hercules foils Midas who sees the negative side of his power especially after accidentally touching Marigold and he convinces the king to ask Bacchus to remove the power. Bacchus agrees, returning everything to normal, and Hermes's sandals are returned to him.
32	"Hercules and the Minotaur"	Bob Kline	Randolph Heard	Rich Chidlaw & Llyn Hunter	November 13, 1998	4347-038
Daedalus, tired of his teaching job, accepts an invitation from King Minos (Charles Nelson Reilly) to travel to Crete and build him a Labyrinth, which will be a wonder of the world. He and Icarus travel to the island where they discover that the Labyrinth is being built to hold the Minotaur (Michael Dorn), a savage half-man, half-bull. Meanwhile, Hercules accepts a challenge to fight the Minotaur and also travels to Crete, unaware the contest will take place in the Labyrinth. Both Hercules and the Minotaur escape the maze, but Hercules tosses the Minotaur back into the Labyrinth where Minos is trying to navigate his way out. Cassandra and the shop students rescue Hercules, Icarus, and Daedalus in a flying machine that they constructed using Daedalus's plans.
33	"Hercules and the Son of Poseidon"	Bob Kline	Kevin Hopps	Denise Koyama, Debra Pugh, John Miller & Suraiya Daud	November 16, 1998	4347-061
Poseidon introduces Hercules to his sea prince son Triton (Chris Elliott), who wants to attend the Prometheus Academy. It turns out Triton is somewhat of a geek, and wants to emulate his cousin Hercules, with disastrous results. Icarus and Cassandra remind Hercules that he and his cousin are not so different. In an attempt to be popular, Triton takes Poseidon's trident and although he impresses the other students with its power, he accidentally unleashes a three-headed sea serpent. The cousins team up to defeat the monster and Poseidon arrives to take back his trident. However, Amphitrite convinces him not to punish the boys, who have both learned a lesson from their experience.
34	"Hercules and the Twilight of the Gods"	Phil Weinstein	Jess Winfield	Todd Britton, Sharon Forward, Rebecca Shen, Francisco Barrios & Phil Felix	November 18, 1998	4347-036
Loki (Vince Vaughn) convinces Hercules and Phil to go with him to Valhalla in Asgard, the hall of the Valkyries, where he can become their thunder god. Loki helps him defeat Thor (David James Elliott), son of Odin (Garrison Keillor), to cause the Twilight of the Gods. The Fates, "moonlighting" as the Norns, warn Hercules and Phil of Loki's treachery. Hercules confronts Loki, but he is tricked into releasing the giant wolf Fenrir, who freezes Hercules and Thor in ice. Hercules surrenders his godhood to Thor because the Twilight of the Gods can only be undone if Thor wields the thunder hammer. Thor tries, but is quickly defeated by Loki. However, Hercules defeats Loki and restores the Norse Gods to their rightful positions. Despite being invited to stay, he decides to return to Greece.
35	"Hercules and the Griffin"	Eddy Houchins	Jan Strnad	Stark Howell & Robert Onorato	November 20, 1998	4347-008
Hercules and his class visit a retirement home and are each assigned a senior citizen to befriend. In an effort to connect with the griffin Griff (Tim Conway), Hercules accidentally reveals the location of the treasured diamond that the Griffin had been guarding for decades from Arismap (Harvey Korman) the King of the Arismapse (thieving mountain gnomes). Arismap hatches a plan to steal the gem, but Griff foils the plan with some help from Hercules.
36	"Hercules and the King For a Day"	Eddy Houchins	Mark Edens & Michael Edens	Shawna Cha, John Miller, Daniel Mills, Leonardo Pinero & Alan Wright	November 24, 1998	4347-057
Hercules and Phil go to Satyrville to visit the latter's mother Cacophone (Estelle Harris), but Phil is irked because she regularly mentions his brother Saul's achievements and never his own. Meanwhile, Pan (Joe Pantoliano), King of the Satyrs, incurs the wrath of Demeter (Florence Henderson), by building a temple to himself rather making offerings to her. When Phil approaches the king for advice, Pan makes Phil the king temporarily to escape Demeter's wrath. When Nemesis (Linda Hamilton), the demigoddess of revenge, arrives and threatens to smite King Phil, Hercules finds Pan and forces him to confess, pressuring him into giving the offerings from the harvest festival to Demeter to save his life. Later, Saul arrives and he and Phil discover that their mother always complimented the other son in their presence to keep them both humble.
37	"Hercules and the Pegasus Incident"	Phil Weinstein	Madellaine Paxson, Bill Motz & Bob Roth	Craig Kemplin & Chris Rutkowski	November 25, 1998	4347-064
After an incident where Hercules chastises Pegasus for interrupting his studies, Pegasus angrily flies off and saves Bellerophon (David Schramm), the hero king of Lycia from the monster Chimera. Bellerophon renames Pegasus Ignatius, and the pair become a great monster-battling team. Hercules is heartbroken over the loss of his friend and convinces him to return, but Bellerophon stops Pegasus using a mind-controlling bridle. It is only after the Chimera escapes its cage and Hercules and Pegasus collaborate to save everyone is Bellerophon's ruse revealed and the pair is reunited.
38	"Hercules and the Big Sink"	Phil Weinstein	Ken Koonce & Michael Merton	Sean Bishop & Todd Britton	December 11, 1998	4347-053
While holidaying in Atlantis, some of Cassandra's predictions come true, causing Homer's newspaper articles to turn her into a celebrity. To keep her newfound status, she falsely predicts that Atlantis will sink, causing everyone to leave. Horrified, Croesus (Wayne Newton), the wealthy owner of Atlantis, pays Hades to capture her and recant her prediction, while paying the Fates to reassure the population. However, as Cassandra is about to tell Homer the truth, she has a vision of Atlantis sinking so Croesus captures them. Hercules confronts Croesus, but he has already paid Poseidon to summon Scylla to protect him. The ensuing fight causes the Fates to accidentally cut Atlantis out of the tapestry, fulfilling Cassandra's vision. As the city sinks, Hades retrieves Pain and Panic, refusing to save Croesus, while Hercules rescues the citizens.
39	"Hercules and the Big Lie"	Bob Kline	Neil Alsip	Jill Colbert Trousdale, Wendell Washer & Daniel Mills	December 16, 1998	4347-058
Hercules is embarrassed when Icarus invites him to the Miklos hero comic-scroll convention in front of Andromeda (Kath Soucie), a new girl he is trying to impress. Cassandra advises him to lie, but he cannot go against his hero training until he wins a ticket at the convention to have his picture carved with Miklos. Embarrassed, he lies that he has a deadly disease called Catastrophia, which Hades ordered Pain and Panic to spread. Cassandra has two visions: that Icarus will find the cure in the land of Briarius (Reggie Miller), the Hundred Handed One, and that he will be crushed. When Hercules learns that Icarus has left to find the cure, he follows and encounters Briares, who challenges him to a contest to free Icarus. When Hercules discovers that Briares is a Miklos fan, he apologizes for lying and gives his ticket to Briarius. After Andromeda hears of his bravery, she asks Hercules on a date.
40	"Hercules and the Prom"	Phil Weinstein	Michael Price	Nicholas Filippi & Garrett Ho	December 21, 1998	4347-063
In an effort to impress Tempest, Hercules promises to get Orpheus (Rob Paulsen) to sing at their prom. Tempest agrees to go with Hercules if he succeeds, or she will cut off his arm. Cassandra rashly promises to do a slow dance with Icarus if Orpheus appears. Meanwhile, Hades is trying to recruit the monster Lastragon (Patrick Warburton) and discovers that he is an Orpheus fan. Hercules and Icarus convince Orpheus to sing, but he is kidnapped by Hades. Hercules goes to the Underworld and rescues him, but they get lost. Orpheus reveals that he is tired of using his voice for money but not talking or expressing himself. Although Hades finds them, Hercules throws a piece of Orpheus' chiton over Hades, causing the crowd of souls to crush him seeking the souvenir. Lastragon crashes the prom, but Orpheus sings to him, calming him down. Cassandra and Icarus have their dance, as do Hercules and Tempest, as Orpheus leaves to travel the world with Lastragon.
41	"Hercules and the Spartan Experience"	Eddy Houchins	Nora Kay Foster & Adam Armus	Carin-Anne Greco, Amber Tornquist & Llyn Hunter	January 4, 1999	4347-047
Adonis seeks help from Hercules to escape from Sparta, but when Hercules and Icarus arrive they discover Adonis is in the Spar OTC, a Spartan training corps commanded by Agamemnon (Patrick Warburton). They learn that Sinarus, King of Thrace, had sent his son Prince Adonis there for military training so Hercules agrees to help him through basic training. Meanwhile, Icarus develops a militaristic attitude, hoping to receive a medal. Fearing the difficult final test, Adonis steals Icarus' wings and escapes, but overhears that Boreas (Alan Rosenberg), the North Wind, plans to attack Sparta in revenge for his defeat by Ares who had established the city. Adonis falls back into Sparta and warns Hercules who tells Agamemnon although he refuses to listen. When Boreas attacks, the trainees draw him down to the city by singing the Spartan anthem which he detests, and Hercules traps him in a giant pipe. Ares awards the three students medals for defeating Boreas, but only gets Adonis to keep his after Ares realizes that Hercules and Icarus are Athenians.
42	"Hercules and the Complex Electra"	Bob Kline	Emily Kapnek	Rich Chidlaw & Llyn Hunter	January 13, 1999	4347-033
Hercules falls for a new student at the academy, Electra (Joey Lauren Adams), a nonconformist and goth. Cassandra explains Electra is uninterested in heroes but she agrees to take Hercules and Icarus to a club where Electra hangs out. Hercules sees Electra being bothered by a gothic boy which makes her angry, and soon Furies attack the club. As Hercules fends them off he dirties his clothes which prompts Electra to compliment him on his unconventional attire. Encouraged, he changes his appearance and helps Electra put up protest posters which is against school policy. When Electra angrily stands up to the School Master (Eric Idle) espousing free expression, there is another Fury attack on the school. After the School Master gives Electra detention, she invites Hercules to the club where she recites a poem denouncing heroes. Hercules finally reveals to her that he is a hero-in-training which infuriates Electra. After another attack by the Furies, Electra finally tells Hercules that the Furies are created by her anger which differentiates her from everyone else. Their irreconcilable differences cause Hercules to realize that he must be himself.
43	"Hercules and the Long Nightmare"	Eddy Houchins	Ken Koonce & Michael Merton	Daniel Mills, Robert Onorato & Todd Britton	February 8, 1999	TBA
At the beginning of time, Zeus assigned all the gods their duties, with Morpheus becoming the god of sleep instead of his brother Phantasos (Tom Kenny), who wanted the job. Centuries later, Phantasos is still jealous and creates a blanket of nightmares that he spreads over the world. The gods hold an emergency meeting on Olympus, as Morpheus has sunk to the bottom of the Deity Approval List. Zeus tells Morpheus to solve the problem, so Morpheus sends Hercules and Phil off to confront their fears in Dreamland, as he suspects Phantasos is responsible. In Dreamland, Hercules confronts the Hydra of his nightmares and rather than running away, he forces it to turn back into Phantasos, returning them to reality. Back on Olympus, Zeus assigns Phantasos to become the god of dreams.
44	"Hercules and the Arabian Night"	Phil Weinstein	Bill Motz & Bob Roth	Craig Kemplin & Chris Rutkowski	February 10, 1999	4347-068
Following his death, Jafar (Jonathan Freeman) meets Hades in the Underworld, and boasts that he can beat Hercules if Hades makes him human again. However, Jafar ends up finding Hercules too strong. Hades then boasts that he can defeat Aladdin (Scott Weinger) and sends off Pain and Panic to do this. However, they find Aladdin too tricky. Jafar suggests that they capture Icarus and Abu (Frank Welker), and frame the heroes for the kidnapping of each other's friends. The ruse works, and when Hercules arrives in Agrabah, Aladdin and Jasmine (Linda Larkin) defeat him using their agility and their knowledge of the city. After realizing they have been duped, Hercules and Aladdin are trapped beneath a building, apparently killed. Hercules saves them, and surmising that Hades and Jafar have teamed up, they go to the Underworld disguised as each other. Jafar does not realize the deception until it is too late and is killed by Hercules. After Abu and Icarus are released, Aladdin tells Hercules he will make a great hero.: Notes: The events of the crossover take place after the events of Aladdin and the King of Thieves.
45	"Hercules and the Aetolian Amphora"	Bob Kline	Gary Sperling	Denise Koyama, Debra Pugh, Nicholas Filippi & Suraiya Daud	February 12, 1999	TBA
Someone has stolen an amphora filled with Lethe water from the Underworld, and Hades sends Pain and Panic to retrieve it while Ares grounds his teenage sons, Fear and Terror, for overfeeding their war dogs so they cannot attend an Orpheus concert. At the academy, Hercules meets Megara (Susan Egan), who asks him to recover her grandmother's Aetolian amphora which she claims has been stolen. He agrees to help but discovers that Megara had hired a centaur to steal the amphora, who sold it to Fear and Terror so they can use the water of forgetfulness to make Ares forget he grounded them. Hercules and Meg go to the Temple of Ares and get the amphora, but while Hercules holds off Ares' sons, Meg ditches him and leaves with the amphora. Meg is soon captured by Pain and Panic, and despite her deceit, Hercules goes to rescue her followed by Fear and Terror. A fight for the amphora ensues, and Meg reveals to Hercules that she wants the water to forget Adonis. She tells Hercules that she liked him from the beginning, but as they are about to kiss, the amphora's water spills on them, causing them to forget everything that happened even each other.
46	"Hercules and the Romans"	Bob Kline	Cade Chilcoat	Jill Colbert Trousdale & John Miller	February 15, 1999	4347-066
Icarus goes to the Library of Alexandria for a school project but falls into Rome on his way back to Greece, where the Romans mistakenly believe him to be a god. Meanwhile, Hercules is worried about his friend and convinces Zeus to assign Nemesis to help him track Icarus. They eventually find him, but Nemesis wants to smite Icarus for claiming to be a god. They are interrupted by three Egyptian gods who arrive to fill the roles of Roman gods, but anger the citizens when they plan to remodel the city like Egypt. Hercules and Nemesis battle them to protect Rome, and in the aftermath, Icarus provides a solution by giving the Greek gods Roman names.
47	"Hercules and the Yearbook"	Eddy Houchins, Bob Kline & Phil Weinstein	Kevin Campbell, Mirith JS Colao, Kevin Hopps, Ken Koonce, Madellaine Paxson, etc	Rich Chidlaw & Debra Pugh	February 17, 1999	4347-070
This episode takes place after the events of the 1997 film and features Hercules and Meg moving into a new home. When an urn is delivered with old papers, Hercules immediately asks Hermes to return it to the island. Meg becomes suspicious so she flies there on Pegasus and discovers that the urn contains his yearbook. Phil then tells Meg about Hercules's series of mishaps while he was a student: how Hercules sunk his island, about his friends Icarus and Cassandra, about his first job driving the sun chariot for Apollo which nearly ended in Hades dethroning Zeus, the incident with Galatea at the prom, and finally the graduation, where he ruins the Academy after arriving late. Hercules tells Meg he does not want to show her the yearbook because he wants her to see him as a hero. During a musical number, Meg tells him that she accepts that part of his life as an awkward phase, and loves him just the same. However, this doesn't stop Hercules from arranging for Hermes to retrieve Meg's yearbook.
48	"Hercules and the Odyssey Experience"	Eddy Houchins	Gary Sperling	Shawna Cha & Leonardo Pinero	February 19, 1999	4347-067
While Hercules is visiting Odysseus's traveling museum, Odysseus convinces Hercules to spend time with his shy and awkward son, Telemachus (Justin Shenkarow). Cassandra's father Vic accidentally unleashes King Aeolus' bag of wind which causes the ship to take off with the boys, Vic, and two ex-crew members of the Argo, Lynceus and Butes on board. The group encounters several threats, including the dangerous and beautiful Sirens, three Cyclopes, and the dangerous passage between Scylla and Charybdis. In the process, Telemachus learns to be self-confident and even save his parents who had set out to rescue him.
49	"Hercules and the Grim Avenger"	Phil Weinstein	Greg Weisman	Todd Britton, Robert Foster, Sean Bishop & Carin-Anne Greco	February 22, 1999	4347-062
Prince Theseus (Eric Stoltz) arrives in Athens at the same time as his superhero alter ego, the Grim Avenger. Cassandra is immediately smitten by him, upsetting Icarus while Adonis is envious of his popularity. The Grim Avenger is chasing the Minotaur, who has wrecked several temples in Athens and after a misunderstanding, Hercules offers to help him. To lure the Minotaur, Theseus holds a party at the temple of Aphrodite where Hercules accidentally discovers his double identity. The ploy works, but Icarus is injured in the process and the Avenger tells Cassandra that Theseus wants her to look after him. Meanwhile, Hercules tracks the Minotaur to a row of temples, most of which are destroyed in the ensuing battle. Theseus stops Hercules and convinces him not to kill the Minotaur but to be a hero, and so Zeus returns the Minotaur to the Labyrinth.
50	"Hercules and the Spring of Canathus"	Eddy Houchins	Kevin Hopps	Carin-Anne Greco & Llyn Hunter	February 24, 1999	4347-069
Hades offers Pain and Panic one last chance to kill Hercules, so after learning from the Fates about the Spring of Canathus, a pool that reverses aging, the pair go to retrieve some of the water. Meanwhile, teacher Euphrosyne has Hercules and his class taking care of eggs to learn about caring. Panic squirts the water on Adonis, Pegasus, Icarus, Hercules, and Pain, turning them into babies thus leaving Cassandra and Panic to take care of them. The pair travel to the Stymphalian Forest again to get more water to reverse the effect, encountering a huge snake and giant Stymphalian birds who want Cassandra to rescue their egg. After everyone has returned to normal, Cassandra has learned to be a mother and Panic has learned responsibility. Meanwhile, those affected plead with Cassandra to not tell anyone about the incident.
51	"Hercules and the Big Show"	Eddy Houchins, Bob Kline & Phil Weinstein	Kevin Campbell, Mirith JS Colao, Kevin Hopps, Ken Koonce, etc.	Debra Pugh	February 26, 1999	4347-071
Hercules and Icarus humiliate Hades on The Merv Griffin Show by screening some of Hercules's career highlights and defeats of Hades. The Lord of the Dead ejects Hercules and captures Merv and Icarus, then turns the show into "The Hades Show". Hades highlights his victories such as convincing Poseidon to extend the River Styx so that Greece became part of the Underworld and includes a segment featuring the exploits of Pain and Panic. Adonis and Helen are invited on the show where Adonis supports Hades, but Helen defends Hercules by featuring his exploits in a musical number. Meanwhile, Hercules borrows Hermes' flying sandals and returns to free his friends, then Zeus lends him a thunderbolt which he uses to smite Hades. With Merv Griffin hosting the show again, Zeus and Hercules appear as guests, but just as Merv asks Zeus the meaning of life, the show runs out of time.
52	"Hercules and the Tiff on Olympus"	Phil Weinstein	Richard Liebmann-Smith, Ken Koonce & Michael Merton	Nicholas Filippi & Garrett Ho	March 1, 1999	4347-039
Hera is angry when Zeus forgets their anniversary which then causes Zeus to reprimand Hercules after he gives his father an anniversary gift. Hercules thinks his parents are disappointed in him and convinces Phil to let him take on his first hero task: defeating King Diomedes's man-eating mares. Meanwhile, Hades uses the tiff between Zeus and Hera to convince Hera that Zeus left her to cloud-hop with Bacchus and convinces Zeus to sleep on a sofa in the Underworld while Hera cools off. Hades then asks Hermes to call an emergency meeting of the gods, saying that Zeus and Hera are splitting and their duties will need to be temporarily given to other deities. Hercules has trouble defeating the mares because Hades sent in his new minion, Neurosis (Richard Lewis), to sap his confidence. Hercules beseeches Zeus for help, while Phil gathers the other gods and they all arrive to disperse the mares. Zeus apologizes to Hera for forgetting their anniversary and Hera apologizes to Zeus for not appreciating the demands of his job. They realize that Hades exploited their situation and send him back to the Underworld, then apologize to Hercules for involving him in their argument.

=== ABC (1998–99) ===
What follows is the list of Hercules episodes that aired on the ABC television network.

No. overall	No. in season	Title	Directed by	Written by	Storyboard by	Original release date	Prod. code
53	1	"Hercules and the First Day of School"	Tad Stones & Phil Weinstein	Bob Schooley & Mark McCorkle	Gary Graham, Carin-Anne Greco & Jill Colbert Trousdale	September 12, 1998	4347-001
Hercules attends his first day of school at the Prometheus Academy where he meets Icarus and Cassandra, but is humiliated by Adonis. To prove himself as somebody important, Hercules goes to the Realm of Monsters, where he challenges a Bi-Clops named Orthos (Wayne Knight and Brad Garrett), the son of Echidna. She insists that Orthos restrict their diet to heroes and royalty only, so when the "hero-in-training" Hercules challenges them, Orthos brushes him aside because he is "stale" and a nobody. Orthos goes to Prometheus Academy instead where they decide to eat Adonis because of his status, but Hercules saves the prince and defeats his first monster as well. Hercules humbly accepts who he is as Phil taught him earlier, despite Adonis receiving all the credit for the monster's defeat.
54	2	"Hercules and the Visit From Zeus"	Bob Kline	Gary Sperling	Ryan Anthony, Francisco Barrios, Rich Chidlaw, Kirk Hanson & David Knott	September 19, 1998	4347-011
Hercules is having trouble dealing with Adonis, but when he mentions this to his father, he does not understand. To prove Hercules wrong, Zeus spends a day as a teenager and becomes popular because of his sporting abilities. However, he cheats by using his powers, so at Hermes' request, he becomes a mortal for 24 hours. While he was very popular as a teen god, as a mortal student Zeus is just like everyone else, subject to humiliation at Adonis's hands. Meanwhile, Hades learns from the Fates that Zeus is mortal and sends his troublesome three-headed dog Cerberus after Zeus. Hercules protects Zeus until he regains his godhood and defeats Hades, but Zeus learns a valuable lesson about how hard it is being mortal. However as he leaves, he fires a small parting thunderbolt at Adonis.
55	3	"Hercules and the Driving Test"	Eddy Houchins	Gary Sperling	Fred Gonzales & Robert Onorato	September 26, 1998	4347-004
Hercules makes a bet with Adonis that he can get his driver's license by sunset to impress Helen; Zeus and Hermes meanwhile make a bet with Hades that he will do the same, and if he doesn't, Hades gets the Elysian Fields. Zeus promises to stay out of it, but Hades doesn't, sending Pain and Panic to stop him. Phil tries to teach Hercules a thing or two, but he eventually goes on his own with Cassandra and Icarus, getting detoured into a game show with Sphinx Martindale (Wink Martindale). After answering the question and winning a chariot, he takes the test, despite being delayed by Pain and Panic. His instructor is Chipacles, so Zeus and Hermes force Phil to aid Hercules. Despite having massive fireballs thrown at them by Hades, Hercules eventually gets his license, impressing Helen and even Adonis, while Zeus gives Hades a teasing "I told you so".
56	4	"Hercules and the Parents Weekend"	Phil Weinstein	Bill Braunstein	Sean Bishop & Wendy Grieb	October 3, 1998	4347-012
It's Parents Weekend, and Hercules can hardly wait for Zeus and Hera to show up and fix Adonis and his idiotic bragging. However, when his loving, rustic mortal parents, Amphitryon and Alcmene (Barbara Barrie), arrive, Hercules is mortified, leaving his parents crushed at his disappointment. However, Hercules puts all other things aside when his parents – along with Adonis's and Cassandra's as well – are captured by Ladon, son of Echidna, for his dinner. Now the farmers, city people and royalty must all get along long enough to forestall dinner preparations until Hercules arrives.
57	5	"Hercules and the Prometheus Affair"	Phil Weinstein	Richard Liebmann-Smith	Craig Kemplin, Rebecca Shen, Todd Britton & Lonnie Lloyd	October 10, 1998	4347-018
After learning that the Titan Prometheus (Carl Reiner) was imprisoned for giving fire to humanity, Hercules sets him free from the eagle (Jerry Stiller) that has tormented him. However, he is unaware that Zeus had imprisoned him, which Hades uses to his advantage to have all the gods hunt down and destroy Prometheus and Hercules. When Zeus finds out what Hercules has done, his son defends himself with the argument that fire has helped humanity, but Hades nevertheless forces a trial by fire, transforming the eagle into a phoenix. Hercules, masterfully using Prometheus's advice about fire, smothers the Eagle with a cloak, convincing Zeus to let Prometheus off the hook, as he merely did what was right.
58	6	"Hercules and the Hero of Athens"	Phil Weinstein	Michael A. Medlock	Nicholas Filippi, Garrett Ho & Todd Britton	October 17, 1998	4347-023
While on a tour which explains why the olive tree is the symbol of Athens, Hercules, Icarus, and Cassandra are attacked by the Nemean Lion (Jeremy Piven). Hercules saves the day by knocking the Lion out, but his rap sheet is so long that he will go to prison for the damage he caused, so Icarus takes the blame; it also turns out he takes responsibility for defeating the Nemean Lion as well. Believing himself to be a true hero, Icarus visits Phil for training, who refuses; Icarus instead moonlights as a superhero, facing the Nemean Lion only to have it knocked out again by Hercules. Angry that his friend is getting all the credit, he explains to Icarus that he defeated the Nemean Lion both times. Icarus, refusing to believe, faces the Lion after it escapes once more, without Hercules, realizing that he didn't defeat the Lion. Hercules comes to his aid at the last second, defeating the Nemean Lion once more, while Icarus gives up the superhero act.
59	7	"Hercules and the Caledonian Boar"	Bob Kline	Don Gillies	Debra Pugh & Martin Warner	October 31, 1998	4347-029
Hercules and Phil join Meleager, Nestor and Chiron in Caledonia (Note: Meleager is known for his Calydonian Boar hunt. Caledonia is a synonym for Scotland while Calydon in Calydonian is a Greek location.) [sic] to hunt boars for the weekend. However, when Hercules sees one, he cannot bring himself to kill it and deserts the others. While out on his own, he meets Artemis, goddess of the wild, who is impressed by his mercy towards the boars and appoints him their protector. Phil meanwhile searches for Hercules and also encounters Artemis, who transforms him into a boar to teach him a lesson. He is then hunted by Meleager, Nestor, and Chiron, who are foiled by Hercules. After Hercules has tied all three heroes up, Artemis returns and changes Phil back, cautioning that the next time they hunt, their prey might be one of their own.
60	8	"Hercules and the Epic Adventure"	Bob Kline	David Hemingson	Francisco Barrios, Rich Chidlaw, Sharon Forward & Alan Wright	November 7, 1998	4347-022
Hercules is proud of the epic poem he has created for an assignment, but is scared of reading it in front of his friends, for fear of what they might think. Meanwhile, Orthos wants revenge for the humiliation Hercules caused him in "Hercules and the First Day of School". Will Hercules be able to stand up to both of these mighty challenges?
61	9	"Hercules and the Poseidon's Cup Adventure"	Eddy Houchins	Mirith J. Colao	Fred Gonzales, Robert Onorato & Denise Koyama	November 14, 1998	4347-013
Poseidon, tired of being forgotten, holds a boating race in his honor, with Adonis competing for Thrace against Hercules and Icarus. However, when their star rower Hylas (Rocky Carroll) is injured, the King of Thrace hires Hercules instead, who abandons Icarus. Fortunately, Amphitrite (Leslie Mann), Poseidon's wife, has taken a special interest in Icarus and helps him and his father Daedalus complete their boat. At a gala held the night before the race, Hercules declares himself bigger than Poseidon, which causes the sea god to unleash Charybdis, a whirlpool-like sea creature, who nearly sinks Hercules and Icarus' ships. Rescuing first his friend and then Adonis, Hercules looks on as Icarus wins the Poseidon Cup, being the only one to have truly earned it.
62	10	"Hercules and the Muse of Dance"	Bob Kline	Emily Kapnek	Jill Colbert Trousdale & Wendell Washer	November 21, 1998	4347-034
When Adonis volunteers Hercules for the school dance, the Muse of Dance Terpsichore (LaChanze) helps him out by inspiring him to dance. His clumsiness is put to the test when he is offered the lead role in the dance, and a stubborn Phil does not think heroes should dance. At the same time, Phil is dating a nymph named Syrinx (Annie Potts) but her father Ephialtes (Jim Varney) forbids it.
63	11	"Hercules and the Kids"	Phil Weinstein	Bill Motz & Bob Roth	Sean Bishop & Wendy Grieb	November 28, 1998	4347-040
Hercules goes to the Jr. Prometheus Academy to teach a class of kindergartners – Alexander the Great (Courtland Mead), a geek who can't tie his sandals; Brutus (Pamela Adlon), a bully and a centaur; Alcides (Christine Cavanaugh), a kid who is always scared and holding his blanket; Callista (Lacey Chabert), a bratty girl who has an Aphrodite doll; and Phillip (Ryan O'Donohue), a kid with teething problems. On a nature hike, Hercules entrusts the map to Alex, but he loses it in a fight with Brutus. They quickly become lost as a giant spider named Acheron (Joel Murray) and a giant mosquito named Ocnus (Kathy Kinney) make them their target. Hercules is wounded by Ocnus after going back for Callista and her Aphrodite doll, so Alex steps up and organizes the group into a rescue team. They free Hercules, who defeats the bugs, and Alex is shown to go from geek to great under Hercules's tutelage. Bob the Narrator later states that Alex would go on to become Alexander the Great where he solved the Gordian Knot in Hercules' presence by cutting through it. However, he never learns to tie his sandals.
64	12	"Hercules and the Gorgon"	Phil Weinstein	Madellaine Paxson	Garrett Ho & Nicholas Filippi	January 9, 1999	4347-035
Medusa the Gorgon (Jennifer Love Hewitt) rescues Hercules from drowning and has a crush on him. Hoping to befriend him, she asks for divine assistance to make her beautiful. Aphrodite offers useful but utterly ignored self-esteem tips and stone-preventing sunglasses, while Hades grants her a beautiful appearance by day in exchange for being his employee by night. But if one true friend accepts her for who she is, he must turn her human permanently. After Hercules finds out what she truly is, he first thinks she has been trying to get close to turn him to stone and she runs off. Icarus makes Hercules realize how unfairly he judged Medusa, and he goes after her. When Hades learns that it is Hercules that Medusa had a crush on, he purposefully reveals her appearance in the dark to turn him to stone. But Aphrodite appears, pointing out the technicality in the contract – that Medusa has found one person who accepts her for who he is. Hades was only concerned with turning Medusa human but she deflects the spell with Hercules' shield at him, restoring him. With his eyes closed, Hercules asks Medusa out, to which she agrees but first takes Aphrodite's glasses.
65	13	"Hercules and the Green-Eyed Monster"	Eddy Houchins	Madellaine Paxson	Carin-Anne Greco, Daniel Mills & Amber Tornquist	January 16, 1999	4347-059
When Daedalus seems distracted, Hercules, Icarus, and Cassandra soon learn that he is in love with a woman named Thespis (Kathy Najimy). Icarus and Hercules go to tell his mother (Jean Smart) who is happy that Daedalus is dating; Icarus then reveals that he is jealous of Thespis and Daedalus's relationship. At their house, Daedalus tells Icarus that they are getting married. After seeing Pandora (Jenna von Oÿ) with her box, he distracts her to steal it, and she does so, unleashing all the miserable things contained within onto Thespis. Hercules manages to re-imprison all of them except Jealousy (Jon Favreau), whom is fuelled by Icarus' own jealousy and grows big enough to swallow him. All but Cassandra enter Jealousy's belly to rescue him, and after Jealousy is safely back in the box, Aphrodite carries out the wedding, with Icarus accepting Thespis as his stepmother.
