= Meg (Hercules) =

Fictional character from Disney's Hercules

Megara
- Hercules character
- First appearance: Hercules (1997)
- Created by: Ron Clements; John Musker
- Based on: Deianira and Megara of Greek mythology
- Voiced by: Susan Egan
- Portrayed by: Krysta Rodriguez (2019 musical); Kacey Rohl (Once Upon a Time)

In-universe information
- Full name: Megara
- Nickname: Meg
- Species: Human
- Significant others: Hercules
- Nationality: Greek
- Master: Hades

Megara, also known as Meg, is a fictional character in Disney's Hercules franchise. Meg first appears in the animated film Hercules (1997) as a young woman enslaved by Hades, god of the underworld. Hades forces Meg to seduce Hercules and uncover his weaknesses in exchange for her own freedom, only to develop genuine feelings for the demigod instead. Loosely based on Megara and Deianira, Heracles' first and third wives in Greek mythology, directors Ron Clements and John Musker adapted Meg into a morally conflicted con artist, and based her role on 1940s screwball comediennes, particularly actress Barbara Stanwyck's performance in The Lady Eve (1941).

Meg is voiced by actress Susan Egan, who had been playing Belle in the Broadway adaptation of Disney's Beauty and the Beast (1994) when she learned of auditions for Hercules. Despite campaigning heavily for the role of Meg, Disney initially prevented Egan from auditioning because the studio felt Meg and Belle's personalities were too different. To prepare for the role, Egan drew inspiration from several classical Hollywood actresses, including Stanwyck, Joan Crawford, Bette Davis, and Lauren Bacall. After opting not to draw the character realistically, supervising animator Ken Duncan decided to input elements of Greek pottery into Meg's hair, body, and clothing, while borrowing some of Egan's own mannerisms.

Reception towards Meg has been positive, with critics citing her independence, wit, and moral ambiguity as welcome departures from previous Disney heroines, as well as praising Egan's performance. Retrospectively, the character is regarded as underappreciated by critics, with several media publications ranking her among Disney's most underrated heroines. Meg has made subsequent appearances in the film's sequel, television spin-off, and video game adaptations, as well as a live-action iteration in Once Upon a Time, portrayed by actress Kacey Rohl.

== Role ==
Meg first appears in Hercules (1997) as a slave working for Hades, god of the underworld. She meets Hercules when he frees her from Nessus, a centaur Meg had been sent by Hades to recruit for his army. Resisting Hercules' help, Meg distrusts men, having once sold her soul to Hades in return for an ex-boyfriend's life only for him to pursue another woman, leaving Meg indebted to Hades for eternity. Hades enlists Meg to entice the seemingly infallible Hercules in hopes of distracting and ultimately defeating him, offering her freedom for uncovering his weaknesses. Upon convincing Hercules to take a day off, they share a romantic evening during which Meg realizes she has unwittingly begun to fall in love with him, although she denies feeling this way. Meg refuses to assist Hades any further, prompting him to kidnap her to lure Hercules upon discovering that Meg is Hercules' weakness. Hades tricks Hercules into giving up his strength in return for Meg's guaranteed safety, only to reveal that Meg was initially working for him. With Hercules incapacitated, Hades attacks Mount Olympus and Thebes, but Hercules remains determined to defend both regions. During the battle, Meg pushes Hercules out of the way of a falling column, by which she is fatally injured. Meg's injury restores Hercules' strength and deems his agreement with Hades null and void, which he uses to confront Hades and retrieve Meg's soul from the River Styx before it reaches the underworld, ultimately reviving her. Hercules' sacrifice for Meg proves himself a true hero, becoming a god in the process and finally allowing him to return to Mount Olympus. However, Hercules chooses to relinquish his immortality so that he can remain on Earth with Meg.

Meg appears as Hercules' wife in the film's direct-to-video sequel Hercules: Zero to Hero (1999), in which she learns about Hercules' past and childhood.

== Development ==
=== Creation and writing ===
Meg's role in Hercules is one of several creative liberties Disney took when adapting the Greek myth into an animated film. In Greek mythology, Megara is Hercules' first wife, with whom the character has several children. The eldest daughter of King Creon, Megara is gifted to Hercules after he defeats the Minyans at Orchomenos. Megara and their children are eventually killed by Hercules himself, having been driven to insanity by Hera, the wife of his unfaithful father, Zeus. These elements were entirely omitted from the animated film while retaining a female character named "Meg", instead adapting her into a con artist with a troubled past, whose relationship with Hercules ultimately redeems her.

The writers adapted the way in which Hercules meets his second wife, Deianira, into the way he meets Meg. Herakles author Emma Stafford determined that Disney had assimilated the character with Deianira, in addition to making Meg older and more experienced. Directors and screenwriters Ron Clements and John Musker primarily drew inspiration for the film from screwball comedies during the 1930s and 1940s, particularly films directed by Preston Sturges and Frank Capra, with Musker describing Hercules as "a comedy about the battle between idealism and cynicism, in the same way as some of those Sturges and Capra movies". Thus, Meg was written as a cynical heroine who finds it difficult to trust men.

The writers based Meg on actress Barbara Stanwyck's character in the film The Lady Eve (1941). Clements said that Meg "was especially interesting for us [to create] because she was so different from the other Disney heroines" of the time period. In addition to her "sharp-tongued" nature, writing Meg as a heroine who plots with the film's villain against its hero was a stark departure from previous Disney heroines and virtually unprecedented at the time. Since Meg initially works for Hades, the writers also drew inspiration from Lola, a temptress contracted to work for the devil in the musical Damn Yankees (1956). According to The Baltimore Sun, Meg was one of Disney's first heroines to have been written with a past and backstory. According to Meg's supervising animator, Ken Duncan, the character undergoes a dramatic arc in the film, "which takes her from being untrusting and hard-edged to being a softer, more open person by the end".

=== Voice ===
Meg is voiced by American actress and singer Susan Egan who, prior to Hercules, had auditioned for every animated Disney film since 1991's Beauty and the Beast. Disney was interested in casting Broadway talent as Meg, instead of casting different actors to provide the character's speaking and singing voices, which was becoming more common in animation. At the time, Egan was starring as Belle in the Broadway adaptation of Beauty and the Beast, a role she originated, and had been four months into her tenure when she learned about auditions for Meg. Despite strong interest in the role and assuming her professional relationship with the studio would increase her chances, Disney refused to let Egan audition, believing Meg's "bad girl" personality was far too removed from Belle for Egan to play. Egan pursued the role until Disney finally relented.

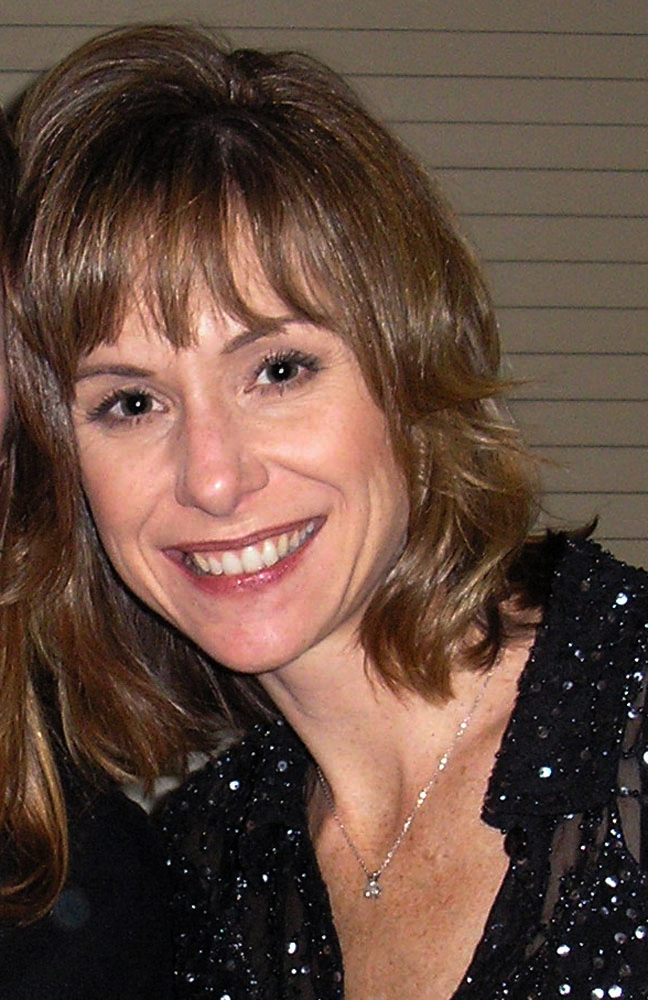
Disney initially prevented actress Susan Egan from auditioning for Meg because they felt the character was too different from Beauty and the Beast's Belle, who Egan was portraying on Broadway at the time.

Several of Egan's Broadway peers lobbied for the same role, including Donna Murphy and Audra McDonald, both of whom attended Egan's audition. Composer Alan Menken and musical director Michael Kosarin, both of whom Egan had worked with on Beauty and the Beast, oversaw her audition. She described the auditioning process as unusual because the creatives did not look at her, preferring to either close their eyes or study a drawing of Meg to avoid being influenced by Egan's appearance. Egan read Meg's lines in her naturally deep voice rather than the manufactured "Belle voice" Disney had grown accustomed to hearing, which surprised the casting directors. Egan explained that "when I play Belle, I'm acting", describing herself as much more similar to Meg personality-wise, and credited her own dating history with preparing her for playing the character. Aware that Meg was based on Stanwyck, Egan researched some of Stanwyck's films, as well as performances by Joan Crawford, Bette Davis, and Lauren Bacall, drawing inspiration from their cadence and mid-Atlantic accents. Egan performed "Somewhere That's Green" from Menken's musical Little Shop of Horrors (1982) as her audition song. Apart from periodic updates from Kosarin, Egan would not hear from Disney until six months later when the studio selected her as one of three contenders to begin animating the character to; she was finally cast after her last animation test.

Egan continued to perform in Beauty and the Beast while working on Hercules, playing Belle in the day and Meg during evenings. Egan's first recording session was postponed due to an onstage foot injury. At one point, Menken warned Egan that she had begun incorporating aspects of Meg's personality into Belle, saying, "You're onstage and your hip juts out ... it's like you're going to roll your eyes and tell the Beast to shave", which she corrected. Egan continued to draw inspiration from classic Hollywood performers, adapting "a hard-boiled frame of mind" when approaching Meg's putdowns, retorts and insults. She channeled actresses Jean Arthur and Ginger Rogers for the scene in which Meg first nicknames Hercules "Wonder Boy". Some of Egan's lines were lifted directly from her audition, particularly "So did they give you a name along with all those rippling pectorals?" and "My friends call me Meg. At least they would if I had any friends". This posed a challenge for the sound engineers, who were tasked with removing background noise such as New York City traffic from the footage. Egan described Meg as "the gorgeous, girl-with-a-track-record" female character that she had always wanted to play, possessing "the Liz Taylor look and the one-liners I wish I could come up with in real life." Egan felt it "fun to be funny" as Meg, believing that her sarcastic and witty personality is typically reserved for male characters.

=== Personality and design ===
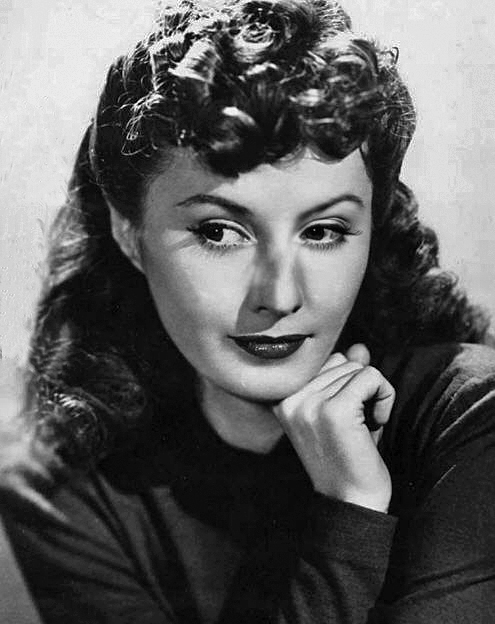
Actress Barbara Stanwyck is among several classic Hollywood actresses by whom Meg's personality and appearance were inspired; Egan also based her voice acting on Stanwyck's performances.

Meg was inspired by 1940s screwball comediennes, specifically actress Barbara Stanwyck's performances in the films The Lady Eve and Ball of Fire (both 1941). Both Egan and supervising animator Ken Duncan drew inspiration from Stanwyck's "tough-minded" demeanor in her films, with Egan describing Meg as a "fast-talking, 1940s dame who has guys wrapped around her little finger". Egan believes Meg is a character "somewhere in between" good and evil, unlike most Disney heroines who are typically either one or the other. Egan called Meg a "beautiful and brilliant" woman "who knows how to go after what she wants," describing her as "disillusioned with people" until she meets "Hercules, who is so pure of spirit and so honest that it re-establishes her faith in goodness." Egan said Meg and Belle are "not exactly the same type" of character; comparing Meg to her other Disney heroine, Belle, Egan described the former as the Beast to Hercules' Belle: "[Meg is] the one who's had a traumatic event in her life which has forced her to lose faith in people. It takes a pure spirit to reestablish that faith. For the Beast, it was Belle. For Meg, it's Hercules." Furthermore, Egan believes "there's no other character like Meg", elaborating that she lacks the moral compass that Belle has "because that's Hercules' job in the movie. She's not a princess, and she's not a villain." Egan believes that Meg undergoes "a much larger arch than the Disney princesses" as she experiences a change of heart, describing her as flawed and feeling that Disney not crowning her a princess makes her "more relatable".

Disney enlisted cartoonist and caricaturist Gerald Scarfe to help design the film's characters. Alongside Hercules, Meg is one of only two prominent human characters in the film; Scarfe determined that neither character "offer[ed] a lot for caricature" in comparison to the film's non-human characters, opting to draw them as "good looking, hunky, pretty" instead. Observing that Disney heroines "ha[ve] certainly evolved over the years", Scarfe identified Meg as very different from Snow White from Snow White and the Seven Dwarfs (1937), describing her as "a feisty, in some ways cynical girl who has a lot of oomph." Duncan served as Meg's supervising animator, both designing and animating the character. His early drawings of her were more Grecian than she ultimately became. Duncan Marjoribanks was originally intended to animate Meg, while Duncan had been slated to animate Nessus. Duncan asked to replace Marjoribanks when the latter left the production to work for DreamWorks Animation. Duncan originally attempted to draw Meg as a realistic-looking heroine. Upon deciding to incorporate elements of Greek pottery into the character's hair, Duncan ultimately decided to base the character's entire body on pottery as well. Duncan hoped that his animation would change how Meg's personality was originally depicted in storyboards, from "tough and angry to street smart and playfully sarcastic." Clements and Musker described Meg's head as "sort of a vase shape", while "she's got a Greek curl in the back." Notably, Meg's hair is designed and animated in a way that is very difficult to replicate in real life.

Egan feels her character closer resembles Stanwyck than herself, although some of Egan's mannerisms, facial expressions and features, such as Egan's arched eyebrows, were incorporated into the character's appearance by animators watching video footage of the actress recording. Duncan said that Egan's voice work inspired his approach to the character's attitudes, poses, and gestures. While reviewing storyboards early during production, Egan recognized Meg performing a "slicing" gesture with her hand she had originated during her audition when her character says "Thanks for everything, Herc. It's been a real slice", which producer Alice Dewey confirmed had been borrowed directly from Egan's audition. Meg's eye colour had been changed from blue to purple by the time Phil's line warning Hercules not to be distracted by her eyes was written, prompting the writers to change it from "Don't let your guard down because of a pair of big, blue eyes" to "goo-goo eyes". In 2011, Egan enlisted Duncan to animate animal characters in the music video for her single "Nina Doesn't Care".

== Characterization and themes ==
Meg is the film's female lead, whose listless personality distinguishes her from Disney's history of earnest heroines. Stylist writer Kayleigh Dray described Meg as manipulative, sarcastic, fierce, and wise, characteristics that Egan said are typically reserved for male characters in Disney films. IndieWire's Greg Ehrbar observed that Meg's sardonicism is "unusual for a Disney heroine", describing her as a "descendant of a Barbara Stanwyck film noir character" who is also hesitant "to get close to anyone lest they wreck her life further", suffering from a complicated past that leaves her bitter and cynical. The Los Angeles Times' Kenneth Turan remarked that Meg is "a different kind of Disney heroine, the kind of been-around, good-bad girl who could have been voiced by Barbara Stanwyck." Meg is also very sarcastic, a characteristic considered to be unusual among most Disney heroines, often speaking in "misandrist quips." Olivia Martello of MovieWeb agreed that Meg has a more complex background than typically afforded to love interests.

Vice writer Jill Gutowitz reviewed that Meg "was measurably more sexual than any female character" at the time of the film's release; "I had never seen a woman treat men the way she did, luring them with her catlike eyes; tugging them around by the shirt collar; dragging her spindly fingers across their pecs. Meg teased her friends and foes, taunting them with an air of mystery that implied she harbored secrets" Observing that "Female characters tend to be fully good or fully bad in Disney movies—a Maleficent or a Sleeping Beauty, if you will", Kate Knibbs of The Ringer wrote that "Meg is a little harder to neatly categorize, as she's a good person with an attitude problem who makes some bad choices. Disney, Pixar, and the Hidden Messages of Children's Films author M. Keith Booker called Meg Hercules' "version of Kryptonite", Superman's weakness. Describing Meg as "cynical and articulate," The Independent's Judith Welikala stated that the character "shows a more devious side normally confined to villainous females," unlike her predecessors. Sabina Ibarra of Moviefone identified Meg as "one of Disney's few lady anti-heroes", representing "a reluctant hero" until she encounters "someone who brings out the good in her".

Meg resents being referred to as a damsel in distress, particularly by Hercules when they first meet. Uninterested in and opposed to the idea of love, the character is cynical towards the idea of new romantic relationships due to suffering from a broken heart as a result of past failed relationships, being one of the few Disney heroines to have had their heart broken prior to meeting their true love. At the same time, love complicates Meg's motivations, affecting choices she makes both about herself and others. The San Francisco Chronicle's Peter Stack wrote that Meg appears to be "as world-weary as a downtown barfly". Hercules must ultimately prove himself a hero by earning Meg's love. According to Bustle's Tracy Dye, Meg "only used her feminine wiles as a guise to pay her dues to evil Hades". PopSugar's Stacey Nguyen considers Meg one of the studio's most sexually confident characters. According to Shoshana Kessock of Tor.com, Meg is an example "of some creative editing ... where [she finds her] particular power in the films: through blatant uses of sexuality." Meanwhile, Meg also undergoes character development, slowly opening up to and sacrificing herself for Hercules. Identifying Meg as "a stronger and more complex female character ... than the typical Disney princess". Booker considers Hercules' decision to sacrifice immortality to be with Meg as a "progressive twist" in which the hero sacrifices something important to be with his love interest, as opposed to the woman sacrificing.

== Critical response ==
Critical reception towards Meg has been mostly positive. Critics such as the Chicago Tribune's Harlene Ellin and Michael Ollove of The Baltimore Sun welcomed her witty personality, complex morals, and backstory as refreshing departures from traditional Disney heroines. Journalist Janet Maslin called Meg "hipper" than typical Disney heroines. Film critic Owen Gleiberman described the character as "refreshingly saucy". Amy Longsdorf of The Morning Call declared Meg "one of the most complicated heroines in the Disney canon" and "revolutionary" for her moral ambiguity. The Irish Times considered the character to be a creative breakthrough for Disney heroines "as the company's first (albeit implied) non-virginal female romantic lead". John Rundin of Animation World Network called Meg "A surprisingly liberated heroine" for Disney and the film's sole exception to the studio's intolerance "for moral complexity and ambiguity". Several critics found the character reminiscent of classic Hollywood actresses such as Barbara Stanwyck, Mae West, and Veronica Lake.

Egan's performance was also widely praised. Film critic Kenneth Turan believes Hercules owes at least some of its success to her work. Derek Armstrong of AllMovie said Egan's delivery "drip[s] with the kind of eyeball-rolling feminist wit that makes [Meg] one of Disney's strongest female characters". Josh Spiegel of /Film described Meg as "vastly more interesting" than Hercules due in part to Egan's performance, dismissing Hercules as an "overgrown child" in comparison. Time ranked Egan's work among Disney's finest voice acting performances. Writing for CNN, Carol Buckland appreciated Egan's "smart, surprisingly sexy" interpretation, but warned that some parents might be disturbed by some of her actions. Similarly, Bob Smithouser of Plugged In was wary of the character's sexuality and immodesty. In a more mixed review, Nell Minow of Common Sense Media said Meg is still mostly relegated to the sidelines despite being "tougher and braver than the traditional damsel in distress".

Critics have discussed how Meg's personality and complexity makes her a stronger, more developed character. Author and film critic Mari Ness said Meg's cynicism, sarcasm, broken heart, and selflessness ultimately makes her more than merely a plot device. Karen Mazurkewich of Playback credited Duncan's design with subverting "the Disney stereotype by crafting a more sly and sexy female lead", prior to whom she often found Disney heroines "cloyingly naive". Shoshana Kessock of Tor.com described the character as a complicated woman whose heart remains entirely her own, despite her internal conflict. Kessock said the character's sexuality "makes her a difficult character for the PG brand. Yet in the pantheon of Anti-Princesses ... she claims her place among the more in command, take-charge Disney women", concluding, "When she finally does give in to her feelings for Hercules, it is after a lot of soul-searching and character growth, something that could be a good story for young women to learn—if she was given the same air time as the other Disney heroines". Romper's Allison Piwowarski described Meg as "a very powerful character in the Disney universe" who "is just as much of a hero as Herc is". Screen Rant's Matthew Wilkinson called Meg "one of Hercules' best characters" because she balances sassy confidence with emotion. Writing for Vice, Jill Gutowitz described Meg's "depth, her wit, her bullheaded resistance to being saved, and her willingness to rebuke masculinity" as "The most intriguing" aspects of her characterization, as opposed to her appearance.

== Legacy ==
Since the release of Hercules, Meg has continued to inspire discourse about the film's reputation and her distinctive role as an unconventional heroine within Disney's canon. A Plus contributor Jill O'Rourke reported that Disney fans often defend Hercules from its detractors due to their strong appreciation for Meg. Dirk Libbey of CinemaBlend hailed Meg as "one of Disney's most interesting female characters", finding it frustrating that her film is less revered than some of its contemporaries. The character has become iconic in her own right due to her combination of sarcastic wit, a guarded heart, and complicated romance with Hercules, according to Pauline Joyce Pascual of the Daily Tribune. Grace Garis of Bustle and Lindsey Weber of Vulture agreed that Meg is superior to Disney Princesses, with Weber describing her as one of Disney's few heroines to possess "an actual personality". Nerdist named Meg "The real star of Hercules", while Clarisse Loughrey of The Independent described her as "a close runner-up for the title" of the film's hero, calling her "the go-to Disney princess for the cool kids". Freeform deemed Meg a character everyone wishes they could be. Thought Catalog ranked Meg Disney's 10th "Most Awesome Female Character". Screen Rant ranked her Disney's 23rd best heroine, with author Colby Tortorici describing her as more "fleshed out" than her predecessors. IndieWire called Meg "one of Disney's best and most complex female characters". The Mary Sue's Rachel Leishman said she is a " femme-fatale-with-a-heart-of-gold" who "remains iconic".

Meg has acquired a dedicated fanbase, despite her relative obscurity compared to other Disney heroines. In retrospect, several media publications have called Meg one of Disney's most underrated female characters, while The Walt Disney Company stated in 2026 that the character had developed a cult following. Dalin Rowell of /Film said Meg seldom receives the attention or merchandising she deserves. Critics have offered different theories attempting to explain Meg's exclusion from the Disney Princess franchise. According to Sara Franks-Allen of ScreenCrush, Meg was omitted due to Hercules' underperformance at the box office, while MovieWeb and Kessock suggested that Disney found the character too sexualized to market. The Ringer's Kate Knibbs believes Meg "would be the only Disney princess with a shitty ex-boyfriend" had she been a member, describing her exclusion as "for the best, because she's also the female Disney character who seems like she'd care the least about the distinction". Naming Meg one of the "10 Best Unofficial Disney Princesses", Collider's Kristin Kranz described her as one of Disney's "most complex, interesting, and authentic" female characters, calling her exclusion from the franchise a shame. Writing for the same publication, Dyah Ayu Larasati crowned Meg Disney's best heroine despite not being a princess, saying she "taught us more about the harsh realities of life than any royal trapped in a tower". Egan said that people constantly remind her that Meg is not a Disney Princess, but she has made peace with it, citing the character's comebacks, relatability and vulnerability as assets.

Some commentators believe Meg's distinct personality and role have helped reshape the Disney heroine archetype, with numerous critics noting her influence on the progression of strong, independent female characters. Author Mari Ness believes Meg is the first Disney love interest to seduce her film's hero with intention of harming him. Bustle writer Tracy Dye credited her cynicism with upending the stereotype of fairy tale heroines being unrelenting in their quests for true love and happy endings, in turn offering "a realistic portrayal of a woman who had become guarded after having her heart broken". According to Cinema Blend's Alexandra Ramos, Meg "walked so that all these independent, strong Disney women could run", citing her as one of Disney's strongest leading ladies due to her willingness to defy Hades despite his power over her. Collider said Hercules "finds the time to cement Megara as one of Disney's strongest non-Princess female characters". Some critics and fans revere Meg as a feminist icon, with Mashable's Erin Strecker writing that she "was always one of the more feminist 'princesses' in the Disney animated canon". Stylist ranked Meg Disney's ninth most feminist princess character, with author Kayleigh Dray crediting her villainous role with disproving that "non-bubbly women are deemed evil". Natalie Xenos of Metro called Meg "the badass heroine cinema needs", recognizing her as a feminist who "was inspiring girls long before Moana and Elsa", and Patrick Ryan of USA Today called her "one of Disney's most subversively feminist characters". Stacey Nguyen of PopSugar argued that Meg is neither a role model or feminist icon like some of her contemporaries but remains one of her favorite Disney heroines, describing her as "one of the richest, most developed characters in Disney's library" who she believes is deprived of the discussion she deserves. Nguyen crowned the character "the other hero in Hercules".

The Disney Cruise Line ship Disney Destiny features a Hercules-themed walk-up café called Café Megara. In 2026, Egan received the Disney Legends Award in recognition of her contributions to The Walt Disney Company.

== In other media ==
Meg guest appears on the television series Disney's Hercules: The Animated Series (1998), in which she eventually marries Hercules. Like many other Disney animated characters, she has cameos throughout the television series House of Mouse (2001–2003). A live-action alternate version of Meg appears on the fantasy television series Once Upon a Time, portrayed by Kacey Rohl. The character first appears in the 13th episode of the show's fifth season, "Labor of Love", alongside Hercules (Jonathan Whitesell). The show's iteration of Meg is described as "a plucky young adventurer with a sly sense of humor and a tough, no-nonsense spirit". In the episode, Meg is imprisoned in the Underworld for several years after having been eaten by Cerberus. She has no affiliation with Hades and little is revealed about her backstory. Critics and audiences were divided over Meg's portrayal in the series; fans expressed their disappointment in the character's weaker, more dependent characterization.

Meg appears in the Kingdom Hearts video game series, beginning with Kingdom Hearts II (2005). She meets Sora during his second visit to the Olympus Coliseum while she was contemplating asking Hades to stop sending monsters for Hercules to fight, having grown fond of him. She accepts Sora's offer for him to go in her stead, under the condition that they keep the arrangement a secret from Hercules. Hades kidnaps Meg as bait to convince Sora to unlock the Underworld's Underdrome, holding her hostage when Hercules and Auron refuse to fight each other in the Underdrome. Sora and Hercules rescue her, promising to repay the heroes as best as she can. The character appears briefly in the game's sequel Kingdom Hearts III (2019). Meg is a playable character to unlock for a limited time in the video game Disney Magic Kingdoms. She is also a playable character in the racing game Disney Speedstorm, once again voiced by Egan.

Actress Krysta Rodriguez originated the role of Meg in the stage adaptation of Hercules, which premiered Off-Broadway in 2019. They ultimately decided to have Rodriguez perform wearing her natural hair, despite fitting her for a wig while rehearsing for the part. Michael Plunkett of Slant complimented Rodriguez's performance but complained that Meg is still rescued in the show's climax, wishing her "dreams of independence" were treated more seriously. Meanwhile, Sara Holdren of Vulture found herself bored by Meg's "sharp-tongued, demonstratively self-sufficient" role.
