= Hercules: Zero to Hero =

1999 television film directed by Bob Kline

- Release poster
- Directed by: Bob Kline; Tad Stones; Phil Weinstein
- Produced by: Bob Schooley; Mark McCorkle
- Starring: Tate Donovan; James Woods; Sandra Bernhard; Matt Frewer; Bobcat Goldthwait; Robert Stack; French Stewart; Barbara Barrie; Jodi Benson; Corey Burton; Robert Costanzo; Roz Ryan; Keith David; Paddi Edwards; Susan Egan; Samantha Eggar; Kathie Lee Gifford
- Music by: Adam Berry; J. Eric Schmidt
- Production companies: Walt Disney Home Video; Walt Disney Television Animation (Note: Animation outsourced to Walt Disney Animation Japan, Walt Disney Animation Australia and Toon City Animation.)
- Distributed by: Buena Vista Home Entertainment
- Release date: August 17, 1999
- Running time: 70 minutes
- Country: United States
- Language: English

Hercules: Zero to Hero is a 1999 American animated fantasy film produced by Walt Disney Television Animation. The film is a direct-to-video follow-up to 1997 animated feature Hercules. It was released on August 17, 1999. The film serves as a package film combining four episodes of Hercules: The Animated Series.

== Plot ==
The film briefly gives Hercules' history after defeating Hades (who off-screen succeeded in getting out of the River Styx and gave up his quest for the rule of Olympus), in which Hercules marries Meg and revisits his teenage years. In particular, it shows an adolescent Hercules's enrollment and the beginning of his adventures at the Prometheus Academy, a school for gods and mortals, which Hercules attended during the time when he was training to be a hero with his mentor, the satyr Philoctetes.

The frame story repurposes footage from the episode "Hercules and the Yearbook" (from Season 1, Episode 47), while the flashbacks are based on the episodes "Hercules and the First Day of School" (from Season 2, Episode 1), "Hercules and the Grim Avenger" (from Season 1, Episode 49), and "Hercules and the Visit from Zeus" (from Season 2, Episode 2).

== Voice cast ==
The following characters appear as they did in the corresponding episodes that the film packaged.

- Tate Donovan as Hercules
- Susan Egan as Megara
- James Woods as Hades
- Corey Burton as Zeus
- Robert Costanzo as Philoctetes
- Frank Welker as Pegasus
- Bobcat Goldthwait as Pain
- Matt Frewer as Panic
- Paul Shaffer as Hermes
- Eric Stoltz as Theseus
- Richard Simmons as Physedipus
- Eric Idle as Parenthesis
- Sandra Bernhard as Cassandra
- French Stewart as Icarus
- Diedrich Bader as Adonis
- Jodi Benson as Helen of Troy
- Michael Dorn as Minotaur
- Paddi Edwards as Atropos
- Brad Garrett as Cyclops Head #1
- Wayne Knight as Cyclops Head #2
- Cheryl Freeman as Melpomene
- Bill Fagerbakke as Orthus
- Kathie Lee Gifford as Echidna

== Releases ==
Hercules: Zero to Hero was first released on home video on August 17, 1999.

== Reception ==
Michelle Erica Green of LittleReview gave the film a rating of B+, writing that while the film "lacks the dazzling visuals of the feature film upon which it is based… it's hard not to be charmed", adding "the characters are all clever and original despite their mythic origins". Conversely, Antagony & Ecstasy gave a scathing review, writing that as the film "was assembled of four episodes of the Hercules cartoon that had already aired in 1998 and 1999", it was "perhaps the single grubbiest cash-in of [all the direct-to-video released]", adding "Zero to Hero was already going to be at such a low level of accomplishment even relative to other DTV projects".

In a review, Vern Perry of the Orange County Register described the Disney formula as "Just give 'em what they like. And keep it up.", noting that's what the company has done with these two 1998/1999 releases. He added that this film benefited greatly from the return of some of the original voice cast including Tate Donovan and James Woods.

== See also ==
- List of films featuring Hercules
