= Hercules (1997 film) =

American animated musical fantasy film

- Theatrical release poster
- Directed by: John Musker; Ron Clements
- Screenplay by: Ron Clements; John Musker; Donald McEnery; Bob Shaw; Irene Mecchi
- Story by: Kaan Kalyon; Kelly Wightman; Randy Cartwright; John Ramirez; Jeff Snow; Vance Gerry; Kirk Hanson; Francis Glebas; Mark Kennedy; Bruce M. Morris; Don Dougherty; Thom Enriquez
- Produced by: Alice Dewey Goldstone; John Musker; Ron Clements
- Starring: Tate Donovan; Susan Egan; Danny DeVito; James Woods
- Edited by: Tom Finan
- Music by: Alan Menken
- Production company: Walt Disney Feature Animation (Note: The 2014 reissue was produced under its current name, Walt Disney Animation Studios.)
- Distributed by: Buena Vista Pictures Distribution (Note: Distributed under the Walt Disney Pictures banner. The 2014 reissue was distributed under its current name, Walt Disney Studios Motion Pictures.)
- Release date: June 27, 1997 (United States)
- Running time: 93 minutes
- Country: United States
- Language: English
- Budget: $85 million
- Box office: $252.7 million

Hercules is a 1997 American animated musical fantasy comedy film loosely based on the legendary hero Heracles (known in the film by his Roman name, Hercules), a son of Zeus in Greek mythology. Produced by Walt Disney Feature Animation, the film was directed by John Musker and Ron Clements, both of whom co-wrote the screenplay with Irene Mecchi, and the writing team of Donald McEnery and Bob Shaw. Featuring the voices of Tate Donovan, Susan Egan, Danny DeVito, and James Woods, the film follows the titular Hercules, a demigod with super-strength raised among mortals, who must learn to become a true hero to earn back his godhood and place in Mount Olympus, while his evil uncle Hades plots his downfall. It features six original songs written by Alan Menken and David Zippel, and an original musical orchestral score also composed by Menken.

Development of Hercules began in 1992 following a pitch adaptation of the Heracles mythological stories by animator Joe Haidar. Meanwhile, Clements and Musker re-developed their idea for Treasure Planet (2002) following the critical and commercial success of Aladdin (1992). Their project was removed from development in 1993, and they joined Hercules later that same year. Clements and Musker studied multiple interpretations of Greek mythology, though they later abandoned darker mythical aspects such as Hercules's birth through Zeus's adulterous affair with Alcmene. The project underwent multiple story treatments and a first script draft was inspired by the screwball comedy films of the classic Hollywood era and popular culture of the 1990s.

During production, McEnery, Shaw, and Mecchi revised Musker and Clements's script. British cartoonist Gerald Scarfe was recruited as production designer and produced over 700 character designs. Research trips to Greece and Turkey provided inspiration for the background designs. The film's animation was done in Burbank, California and Paris. Computer animation was used in several scenes, predominantly in the Hydra battle sequence. The production budget was $85 million.

Hercules was released June 27, 1997, and received generally positive reviews from film critics, with James Woods's performance as Hades receiving particular praise. The animation (particularly the visual style) and music received a mixed response. The film under-performed in its theatrical release notably in comparison to previous animated Disney films, ultimately earning $252.7 million in box office revenue worldwide. Hercules was later followed by Hercules: The Animated Series, a syndicated Disney television series focusing on Hercules during his time at the Prometheus Academy, and the direct-to-video prequel Hercules: Zero to Hero (1999), which consists of four episodes from the TV series.

== Plot ==
In Ancient Greece, the gods Zeus and Hera have a son named Hercules. While the other gods are joyful, Zeus's wicked brother Hades plots to overthrow Zeus and rule Mount Olympus. Through the Fates, Hades learns that in eighteen years, a planetary alignment will allow him to free the Titans to conquer Olympus, but only if Hercules does not interfere. Hades sends his minions, Pain and Panic, to murder Hercules, providing them with a potion that can strip a god of immortality. The two kidnap the baby and feed him the potion, but a married farmer couple pass nearby, causing the demons to flee before Hercules can drink the very last drop; therefore he is only stripped of immortality but retains his god-like strength. The couple adopt Hercules, and Pain and Panic decide not to report their failure to Hades.

Years later, the teenage Hercules is ridiculed for his inability to control his strength while inadvertently causing destruction to a building. Wondering about his origins, he decides to visit the Temple of Zeus for answers. There, a statue of Zeus comes to life and reveals all to Hercules, telling him that he can earn back his godhood by becoming a "true hero". Zeus sends Hercules and his forgotten childhood friend Pegasus to the satyr Philoctetes ("Phil") who is known for training heroes. After completing the training, Phil and Hercules travel to Thebes, so he can prove himself there as a hero. On the way, they meet Megara ("Meg"), a sarcastic damsel whom Hercules saves from the centaur Nessus. Unbeknownst to Hercules, Meg is Hades's slave due to selling her soul to him to save her boyfriend, who eventually left her for another woman. When Meg mentions Hercules to Hades, he realizes Pain and Panic's failure and plots to finish off Hercules properly.

Hades stages an accident with the disguised Pain and Panic to trick Hercules into fighting with the Hydra. Hercules defeats the monster, earning the Thebans' respect and admiration. He defeats many other monsters afterward, each of them sent by Hades, and becomes a celebrated hero. However, Zeus tells him that he is not yet a "true" hero but refuses to explain what that means. Saddened and frustrated, Hercules spends a day out with Meg, during which they fall in love with each other. Realizing this, Hades, on the eve of his takeover, holds Meg hostage and offers her freedom in exchange for Hercules surrendering his strength. On the condition that Meg will be unharmed, Hercules accepts but is heartbroken after learning that Meg was working for Hades all along.

Hades unleashes the Titans, who defeat the gods on Olympus, while the Cyclops goes to Thebes to kill Hercules. After receiving encouragement from Phil, Hercules uses his wits to defeat the Cyclops. During the battle, Meg is mortally injured while saving Hercules from a falling pillar. This breaks Hades's deal, so Hercules regains his strength. Hercules and Pegasus fly to Olympus, free the gods and vanquish the Titans, but Meg dies from her injuries.

To recover Meg's soul, Hercules goes to the underworld and risks his life by leaping into the River Styx. This act restores his godhood and immortality, so he is able to reach Meg's soul and climb out alive. Hercules punches Hades into the Styx, and he is dragged to its depths by vengeful souls. After Hercules revives Meg, he is summoned to Olympus, where Zeus and Hera welcome him home, saying he has proven himself a "true hero" through the "strength of his heart". However, rather than joining the gods, Hercules chooses to remain with Meg, living on Earth as a demigod. Returning to Thebes, they watch Zeus form a constellation in Hercules's honor, much to Phil's happiness.

== Voice cast ==
- Tate Donovan as Hercules, a powerful demigod based on the mythological deity Heracles.
  - Josh Keaton provided the speaking voice of Hercules as a teenager, while Roger Bart provided his singing voice.
- Susan Egan as Megara, Hercules's love interest and Hades's former servant.
- Danny DeVito as Philoctetes/Phil, a crotchety, old Satyr (half-man, half-goat) who served as a trainer of heroes in Ancient Greece, most notably Achilles and the powerful demigod, Hercules.
- James Woods as Hades, Hercules's uncle and Zeus's brother who is the ruler of the Underworld.
- Rip Torn as Zeus, king of the gods and Hercules's birth father.
- Samantha Eggar as Hera, queen of the gods and Hercules's birth mother.
- Lillias White, Cheryl Freeman, LaChanze, Roz Ryan and Vaneese Thomas as the Muses (Calliope, Melpomene, Terpsichore, Thalia and Clio respectively), the narrators of the film's story.
- Bobcat Goldthwait and Matt Frewer as Pain and Panic, Hades's henchmen.
- Patrick Pinney as the Cyclops.
- Hal Holbrook and Barbara Barrie as Amphitryon and Alcmene, Hercules's adoptive parents.
- Amanda Plummer, Carole Shelley and Paddi Edwards as Clotho, Lachesis, Atropos, the three Fates who predict Hades's failed attempt to conquer Olympus.
- Paul Shaffer as Hermes.
- Jim Cummings as Nessus.
  - Cummings also voiced the Tall Theban and the Elderly Theban.
- Wayne Knight as Demetrius
- Mary Kay Bergman as the Earthquake Lady
- Corey Burton as the Burnt Man
- Kathleen Freeman as the Heavyset Woman
- Keith David as Apollo
- Charlton Heston has a cameo role as the opening narrator.
- Frank Welker as Pegasus.

== Production ==
=== Development ===
In early 1992, thirty artists, writers, and animators pitched their ideas for potential animated features, each given a limited time of two minutes. The Odyssey was pitched first and by the summer of 1992, Disney announced it was in development. However, The Odyssey was later cancelled when the narrative proved to be too long, lacked central characters, and failed to translate into animated comedy.

Animator Joe Haidar also suggested pitching a story from Greek mythology, but thought his chances plummeted when The Odyssey was discontinued. Nervously, he produced a pitch sketch of Hercules, and delivered a brief outline set during the Trojan War where both sides seek the title character for their secret weapon. Hercules makes a choice, without considering the consequences, though in the end, he learns humility and realizes that strength is not always the answer. With the pitching session concluded, Hercules was approved for development based on Haidar's page-and-a-half outline, but his involvement with the project went no further.

In November 1992, following the success of Aladdin (1992), directors Ron Clements and John Musker re-developed Treasure Planet up until fall 1993. Aladdin co-screenwriters Ted Elliott and Terry Rossio subsequently took Clements and Musker's earlier ideas and wrote a treatment. Jeffrey Katzenberg, who was the chairman of Walt Disney Studios, disapproved of the project, and instead suggested they do an adaptation of A Princess of Mars (in which Disney had held the film rights to). Clements and Musker were uninterested in the adaptation, and the film rights were transferred to Paramount Pictures in 2002.

Katzenberg later struck a deal with the directors to produce another commercially viable film before he would green-light Treasure Planet. Clements and Musker glanced over the concept artwork of the studio's in-development projects such as Don Quixote, The Odyssey, and Around the World in Eighty Days. They felt some of these projects lacked comedic potential or would not translate well into animation. They later learned about Haidar's pitch for a Hercules feature. "We thought it would be our opportunity to do a "superhero" movie," Musker said, "Ron and I being comic book fans. The studio liked us moving onto that project and so we did [Hercules]."

=== Writing ===
With Hercules as their new project, Clements and Musker conducted research and wrote extensive notes for the film. On excerpts detailed in November 1993, their story outlines shared similarities such as the naïve title character caught between two worlds, a Danny DeVito-type sidekick, a world-wise heroine, and a powerful villain in a battle of idealism versus cynicism. The directors were also inspired by screwball comedy films directed by Preston Sturges and Frank Capra with "Hercules as the young Jimmy Stewart in Mr. Smith Goes to Washington," Musker explained, and "Meg is modeled on Barbara Stanwyck, especially the characters she played in The Lady Eve and Meet John Doe."

Before they wrote a script, Clements and Musker consulted the works of Thomas Bullfinch, Edith Hamilton, Robert Graves, and other interpreters of Greek mythology until they reached the conclusion to not portray the traditional story of Hercules. According to the myths, Zeus lusted after Alcmene, a mortal woman who was married to Amphitryon. Zeus disguised himself as Amphitryon and raped Alcmene, who later gave birth to Hercules. Zeus's wife Hera learned about his adulterous affair, and therefore tormented Hercules for the rest of his life. Clements remarked "that illegitimacy would be difficult subject matter for a Disney movie. So [he and Musker] thought of different ways he could be half-man and half-god. [They] moved more toward making Hades the villain instead of Hera. The Underworld seemed like such a fascinating, dark image; the contrast with Olympus seemed to have all kinds of visual possibilities."

Furthermore into their research, Clements and Musker felt Hercules's popularity in the ancient Greek world was analogous to the celebrity fandom of sport athletes and actors in the 20th century. Musker stated, "He was a populist hero in the ancient world. When we researched him at the British Museum, for example, Hercules's face was on a huge number of vases. He seems to have been the hero that people loved because he had a touch of innocence, and he persevered as an athlete-hero when all the odds were stacked against him."

After multiple meetings and story conferences, Clements and Musker wrote several story treatments before they wrote their first draft of the script. Comedy writers Donald McEnery and Bob Shaw were recruited by creative executive Jane Healey to work on Hercules. Meanwhile, screenwriter Irene Mecchi made revisions to the script, which altogether simplifed the script and brought additional humor. Gerald Scarfe, the film's production designer, stated it took nine months to write the script.

=== Casting ===
Donny Osmond originally auditioned as the speaking voice of the title character, but was turned down because his voice was considered too deep. Osmond later provided the singing voice for Shang in Mulan (1998). Tate Donovan auditioned seven times over an estimated period of three months. After another three months had passed, Donovan learned he was cast. He recorded the voice of Hercules for the next two and a half years. During this time, Donovan stated he only saw his co-star Danny DeVito once, who was recording his lines in a separate booth. While recording young Hercules, Josh Keaton had also provided his singing voice, but his singing was re-recorded by Roger Bart.

Musker and Clements wrote the part of Philoctetes with Danny DeVito in mind. However, DeVito declined to audition so Ed Asner, Ernest Borgnine, and Dick Latessa were invited to read for the part. After Red Buttons had auditioned, he left stating, "I know what you're gonna do. You're gonna give this part to Danny Devito!" Shortly after, the directors and producer Alice Dewey approached DeVito at a pasta lunch during the filming of Matilda (1996), where DeVito signed on to the role.

Ever since Beauty and the Beast (1991), Susan Egan auditioned for a voice role in a Disney animated feature film, but was cast as Belle in the Broadway production. When she learned about Hercules, Egan actively pursued the role of Megara, though she revealed that "Alan Menken initially blocked me from going after that part. He said that the female lead in Hercules was supposed to be this cynical smart-ass, sounding nothing at all like sweet, innocent Belle." Menken eventually relented and allowed Egan to audition for the role.

Egan read for the part in front of a microphone while being videotaped. Clements, Musker, Menken, and Beauty and the Beast musical director Michael Kosarin among others sat at a nearby table with their eyes closed. During a period of nine months, a character animation test was made using Egan's audition, in which Egan won the role. Throughout the recording process, Egan recorded her lines frequently with her co-stars Tate Donavan and James Woods, though she never met DeVito. During production, Meg was originally given a ballad titled "I Can't Believe My Heart", but Ken Duncan, the supervising animator of Meg, pointed out the song was out of character for Meg. Menken and Zippel would later compose "I Won't Say I'm in Love" instead.

Musker and Clements found the casting of Hades problematic. When DeVito asked them who they had in mind to play Hades, Musker and Clements responded by saying they had not selected an appropriate actor. In response, DeVito blurted, "Why don't you ask Jack [Nicholson]?" After DeVito notified Nicholson about the project, the next week, Nicholson arrived at the Feature Animation Building in Burbank, with his daughter Lorraine dressed as Snow White. The Nicholsons were given a studio tour and dined at the Team Disney Building, where Clements and Musker pitched him the project.

Nicholson enthusiatically agreed to do the film, though the studio was willing to pay him $500,000 for the role. Nicholson however demanded roughly a paycheck of $10–15 million, plus a 50 percent cut of all the proceeds from Hades merchandise. Unwilling to share merchandising proceeds with the actor, Disney came back with a counter offer that was significantly less than what he had asked for. Because of this, Nicholson decided to pass on the project.

Disappointed by Nicholson's refusal, Clements and Musker eventually cast John Lithgow as Hades by the fall of 1994. After nine months of trying to make his portrayal of Hades work, Lithgow was released from the role in August 1995. According to John Musker, Ron Silver, James Coburn, Kevin Spacey, Phil Hartman, and Rod Steiger arrived to the Disney studios to read as Hades. Musker also invited producer Robert Evans to read. Additionally, animator Nik Ranieri claimed Michael Ironside, Terrence Mann, and Martin Landau also auditioned for the role, and that Musker and Clements had reached out to Jerry Lewis to read for the role.

When the directors invited James Woods to read for the part, they were surprised by Woods' interpretation, and he was hired by October 1995. Alice Dewey, the film's producer, remarked that Woods fundamentally changed the character as initially he "was supposed to talk in a slow and be menacing in a quiet, spooky way". With Woods in the role, his manner of speaking "a mile a minute" proved to be "great take" for Hades. While recording his part, Woods ad-libbed a considerable amount of his lines, especially in Hades's dialogue with Megara.

Hades's co-henchman Pain was written with Bobcat Goldthwait in mind, although Goldthwait confessed he still had to audition despite playing himself.

=== Animation and design ===
In 1993, Clements and Musker fondly remembered a Time magazine cover of the Beatles, illustrated by English cartoonist Gerald Scarfe. While working as the production designer on a production of The Magic Flute, Scarfe was invited to tour the Disney studios where Clements and Musker noticed a direct correlation between Scarfe's style and the Greek vase painting style. With permission from the Disney studios, Scarfe was hired as the production designer, in which he created a dozen drawings. From his London home, Scarfe conducted minimal research, not wanting to be influenced by other interpretations where he sent 32 sketches via fax machine or courier. Towards the end of the production, he had produced more than 700 drawings.

By July 1995, Scarfe and 15 animators and designers began developing the final designs of each character in the film. That same year, the filmmakers embarked on a research trip to Greece and Turkey to research classic Greek mythology. Since Scarfe's style proved to be too fluid and chaotic for the animators, production stylist Sue Nichols created reference charts for the animators containing elements of Scarfe's style, as well as classical Greek illustration, to adapt into their work. Animation began in late 1995 with a team of nearly 906 artists, animators, and technicians in Burbank, California and Walt Disney Feature Animation France in Paris. About ten minutes of the film was animated in Paris.

Andreas Deja, the supervising animator for Hercules, had previously animated Disney villains such as Gaston in Beauty and the Beast (1991), Jafar in Aladdin (1992), and Scar in The Lion King (1994). Because of Deja's previous experience, he was first offered Hades, but instead asked to animate Hercules instead: "I knew it would be more difficult and more challenging, but I just needed that experience to have that in your repertoire." Previously, Deja had supervised about four animators within his unit. For Hercules, he had a team of twelve or thirteen animators, which Deja called the "largest [he] ever worked with".

Deja described the title character as "...not a smart aleck, not streetwise, he's just a naive kid trapped in a big body". He also stated that Donovan "had a charming yet innocent quality in his readings". Donovan had not done any voice-over work prior to Hercules. As he watched videotapes of Donovan's recording sessions, Deja integrated Donovan's "charming yet innocent quality" into Hercules's expressions. Randy Haycock served as the supervising animator for Hercules as an infant and teenager.

After he had co-directed Pocahontas (1995), Eric Goldberg was initially assigned to animate Hades when Jack Nicholson was thought to play the character. However, when Nicholson decided to pass on the role, Goldberg was not interested in animating the character anymore. Around the same time, Chris Buck was assigned to animate Philoctetes, but after he left the production of Hercules, this left the character of Philoctetes without a supervising animator. Goldberg then decided to instead animate Philoctetes when DeVito signed onto the role, noting his similarities with the actor in their short stature, baldness, and admittedly a little "soft around the middle". Throughout production, there were 27 designs for the character. The final design was inspired by Grumpy in Snow White and the Seven Dwarfs (1937) and Bacchus in Fantasia (1940) in terms of their curmudgeonly personality and facial structure.

The character of Hades was animated by Nik Ranieri, who took inspiration from Scarfe's concept drawings and James Woods' physical mannerisms during the recording sessions. Because Woods ad-libbed most of his lines, Ranieri felt the hardest part in animating Hades was that he talks too much and too fast, so much so that "it took [him] two weeks to animate a one-second scene". Also, Ranieri watched the actor's other films and used what he saw as the basis for Hades's sneer. While Hades's body was drawn by hand, the animation of the fiery hair was handled by the effects animators with input from Ranieri as to how it should move.

For the Hydra, Scarfe provided preliminary drawings to give the mythical beast its requisite fangs and serpentine necks before work was transferred over to the computer animation team headed by Roger Gould. The Hydra was sculpted into a clay model where the dimensions were digitized into the computers as a wire-frame model by which the monster was animated. Early into production, the filmmakers decided the Hydra would ultimately have thirty heads by which the animators created one master head, and the computer could multiply the heads to their desired scale. Overall, thirteen animators and technical directors spent nearly a year-and-a-half creating the four-minute battle sequence. Additionally, because the directors envisioned Olympus as a city composed of clouds, painted backgrounds of clouds and cloud-like imagery were blended with drawn effects animation to create a morphing technique that were used for baby Hercules's cradle and Zeus's reclining chair.

=== Music ===
The soundtrack for Hercules consists of music written by composer Alan Menken and lyricist David Zippel, orchestrated by Daniel Troob and Michael Starobin, with vocals performed by Lillias White, LaChanze, Roz Ryan, Roger Bart, Danny DeVito, and Susan Egan among others. The album also includes the single version of "Go the Distance" by Michael Bolton. This was the last Disney Renaissance film for which Alan Menken composed music.

== Release ==
=== Marketing ===
On February 4, 1997, Disney began its marketing campaign by starting a five-month promotional traveling tour called Disney's Hercules Mega Mall Tour. Sponsored by Chevy Venture, the tour traveled throughout 20 cities, which began in Atlanta, Georgia. Previously used for the marketing campaigns for Pocahontas (1995) and The Hunchback of Notre Dame (1996), the tour featured eleven attractions including a multimedia stage show, a miniature carousel themed to Baby Pegasus, a carnival with Hercules–themed game booths, and a ten-minute animation workshop hosted by animator Andreas Deja where visitors would try their hand at drawing Hercules.

On June 14, 1997, the premiere of the film was screened at the newly-renovated New Amsterdam Theatre. Afterwards, a Hercules–themed performance of Disneyland's Main Street Electrical Parade was held in Times Square, one of only two times the parade appeared outside of a Disney Park. The parade of electrified floats, which was broadcast live on the Disney Channel as part of a program involving the making of Hercules, traveled from 42nd Street to Fifth Avenue. The parade also included attendees such as Lauren Hutton, Harvey Keitel, Andy Garcia, Barbara Walters, Michael Bolton, and Marilu Henner, as well as Olympic athletes who rode on thirty floats.

The media event was heavily criticized as former New York Mayor Ed Koch objected to the Disney premiere. Koch stated, "Ten movies open up every Friday. Why don't you shut down every avenue between Fifth and Twelfth? [...] We should be nice to Disney but not be silly – a movie doesn't deserve this." Critics also raised questions to what extent U.S. politicians were willing to give a private firm in return for investment. Also, nearly 100 members of National Association of Broadcast Employees and Technicians (NABET) used the premiere to strike for a new contract from Disney/ABC. The union's president Tony Capitano complained: "I think the Mayor gave away the city to Disneyland."

Furthermore, 5,000 businesses and residents within the city felt uncomfortable at being asked to dim their electricity as the parade passed by. After the parade, a private party was held at the Chelsea Piers complex, where dinner guests were served to a performance of Susan Egan singing songs from the movie along the Hudson River, and ten minutes of fireworks display.

Additionally, the film was accompanied by a marketing campaign with promotional tie-ins with 85 licensees including McDonald's, Mattel, Nestlé, Hallmark, and various merchandise. A tie-in video game, titled Hercules Action Game, was developed by Eurocom and released in July 1997 for the PC and PlayStation. Another tie-in game was developed by Tiertex Design Studios and was released for the Game Boy by THQ the same month. Hercules was also the first Disney on Ice adaptation before the film was theatrically released.

=== Home media ===
Hercules was first released on VHS and widescreen LaserDisc in the United States on February 3, 1998, included as an installment of the Walt Disney Masterpiece Collection series. By the summer of 1998, the operating income of the VHS release had accumulated to $165 million in worldwide sales. Released on November 9, 1999, Hercules was released in a "Limited Issue" DVD for a limited sixty-day time period before going into moratorium.

Hercules was reissued on August 1, 2000, as part of the Walt Disney Gold Classic Collection series on VHS and DVD. The THX-certified DVD contained the film in its 1.66:1 aspect ratio. The DVD contained special features such as "The Making of Hercules" documentary video and the "Go The Distance" music video sung by Ricky Martin, along with an "Animals of the Outback" activity booklet. The early DVD issues used a 35 mm print of the film, rather than encoded the movie digitally through the computer.

The film was released on a Special Edition Blu-ray, DVD, and Digital HD on August 12, 2014. On September 1, 2017, Hercules began streaming on Netflix.

== Reception ==
=== Box office ===
Wall Street analysts estimated that Hercules could bring in between $125 and $150 million in the United States, on the basis of the extensive marketing campaign and the movie's light, humorous tone similar to that of Aladdin. The delay of James Cameron's Titanic to December 1997 allowed Hercules and other major summer blockbusters such as Speed 2: Cruise Control, Air Force One, George of the Jungle, Contact, Conspiracy Theory, My Best Friend's Wedding, and Con Air to substantially benefit their earnings. Hercules began its limited release in North America on June 13, 1997, playing in one selected theater. The film earned nearly a quarter-million dollars in box office receipts during the weekend of June 13–15, standing at the thirteenth place in the box office ranking. During its first two weeks, the film had grossed $1.45 million when it expanded into two selected theaters.

The general release followed on June 27, 1997, in 2,621 screens. During the weekend of June 27–29, box office analysts estimated that Hercules earned $21.5 million, ranking second behind Face/Off, which grossed $23.3 million. During its first two weeks of general release, Hercules amounted $58 million in box office grosses, compared to Pocahontas (which took in $80 million) and The Lion King (which grossed $119 million) in their respective two weeks. Considered a disappointment among Disney shareholders, Disney's stock price slipped 9.7 percent by which executives blamed the film's box office performance on "more competition".

By its third weekend, Buena Vista Pictures Distribution president Dick Cook confessed that competing family films such as Men in Black and Batman & Robin played a role in the downward box office performance, but projected the film would receive a worldwide gross of $300 million. Likewise, entertainment analysts speculated Hercules did not appeal strongly towards adults and teenagers compared to Beauty and the Beast, Aladdin, and The Lion King, which served as date movies and family outings. By spring 1998, Hercules grossed $99 million, and the international totals for Hercules raised its gross to $253 million.

In Japan, Hercules earned an opening gross of $700,000, ranking in third place behind The Lost World: Jurassic Park and Princess Mononoke. The film was in second place behind The Full Monty in the UK during its opening weekend, making $1.1 million.

=== Critical response ===
Hercules received generally positive reviews from critics. On the review aggregator website Rotten Tomatoes, 83% of 113 critics' reviews are positive. The website's consensus reads: "Fast-paced and packed with dozens of pop culture references, Hercules might not measure up with the true classics of the Disney pantheon, but it's still plenty of fun." Metacritic, which uses a weighted average, assigned the film a score of 74 out of 100, based on 22 critics, indicating "generally favorable" reviews. Audiences polled by CinemaScore gave the film an average grade of "A" on an A+ to F scale. According to journalist Franklin Foer, most contemporary critics praised the film for deviating from Disney's standard musical-comedy formula.

James Woods received universal acclaim from film reviewers for his vocal performance as Hades. Owen Gleiberman of Entertainment Weekly graded the film an A−, in which he felt it was Woods' most exciting performance since Salvador. He wrote his performance "is an inspired piece of deadpan vaudeville. His dry jocularity is hilariously incongruous – he's like a hostile, wisecracking salesman trapped in the body of the Antichrist." Roger Ebert of the Chicago Sun-Times wrote a positive review of the film, enjoying the story as well as the animation. Ebert also praised Woods' portrayal of Hades, stating that Woods brings "something of the same verbal inventiveness that Robin Williams brought to Aladdin". Similarly, Gene Siskel of The Chicago Tribune, who awarded the film 2 out of 4 stars, stated: "The only memorable character in the film is the nicely drawn villain Hades (voice by James Woods), who seeks to turn Hercules to the dark side. Hades supplies the genie-like patter that Robin Williams provided in Aladdin."

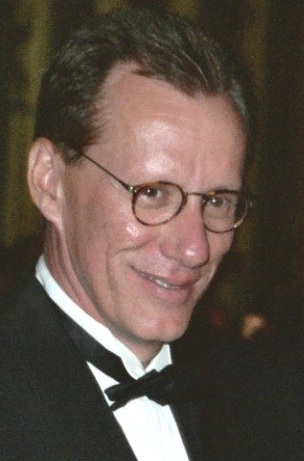
James Woods (pictured in 1995) was praised for his vocal performance as the villain Hades.

Janet Maslin of The New York Times also praised Woods' performance, remarking that he "shows off the full verve of an edgy Scarfe villain" and added "On any level, earthly or otherwise, the ingenious new animated Hercules is pretty divine." James Berardinelli, film critic for ReelViews, awarded the film 3 out of 4, stars writing, "The real star of the show is James Woods, whose Hades is the most vibrant Disney creation since Robin Williams' Genie. Hades is a lively villain with a great repertoire of one-liners. And, although Woods isn't as much of a vocal chameleon as Williams, he's close enough that it hardly matters."

The Scarfe-inspired animation style received mixed reviews, with Berardinelli labeling it as the film's most disappointing aspect. He wrote: "This approach makes the film look rushed and, at times, incomplete. It is never a visual marvel – even the computer-generated scenes fail to impress. The sequences intended to offer the biggest spectacle – Olympus and the Underworld – provoke little more than a yawn." Likewise, Siskel noted his surprise of "how soft and cheap the animation looks." For The Washington Post, Desson Howe criticized the animation as being "some of the worst I've ever cringed through, including the corner-cutting junk of Don Bluth movies and every trashy cartoon that passes for entertainment on Saturday morning television. In Hercules, ancient Thebes looks like a hastily sketched field-trip location from public TV's The Magic School Bus; and no self-respecting immortal would be seen dead in this simplistic rendition of Mount Olympus. Nevertheless, Kenneth Turan of the Los Angeles Times noted the animation "has just enough of a different look to it to make things interesting" and praised the Hydra as a technological marvel.

Likewise, the music also received a mixed response, with Rita Kempley of The Washington Post writing, "Like the other songs by Disney veteran Alan Menken and his new lyricist, David Zippel (City of Angels), the number gets the job done, but it doesn't topple the temple. The score is influenced by gospel, Broadway musicals, processional music and R&B, but its only spice is its variety." Leonard Klady for Variety noted the lack of distinctiveness of the music writing Menken "is hitting too many tired notes in his sixth animated score" and "there's simply not a song in the piece that has you humming as you exit the theater, and ballads such as "Go the Distance" will require aggressive repetition to register as playlist material."

=== Controversy in Greece ===
Disney intended for Hercules to have an open-air premiere at Pnyx hill, but the Greek government declined after the film received backlash from Greek critics and audiences. The film would be retitled to Beyond the Myth of Heracles in Greece. The Greek newspaper Adesmevtos Typos called it "another case of foreigners distorting our history and culture just to suit their commercial interests".

=== Accolades ===
List of awards and nominations
Award	Category	Nominee(s)	Result	Ref.
Academy Awards	Best Original Song	"Go the Distance"; Music by Alan Menken; Lyrics by David Zippel	Nominated	
Annie Awards	Best Animated Feature		Nominated	
Annie Awards	Best Individual Achievement: Directing in a Feature Production	Ron Clements and John Musker	Won	
Annie Awards	Best Individual Achievement: Producing in a Feature Production	Alice Dewey, Ron Clements, and John Musker	Won	
Annie Awards	Best Individual Achievement: Character Animation	Ken Duncan (for Meg)	Nominated	
Annie Awards	Best Individual Achievement: Character Animation	Nik Ranieri (for Hades)	Won	
Annie Awards	Best Individual Achievement: Effects Animation	Mauro Maressa	Won	
Artios Awards	Best Casting for Animated Voice-Over	Ruth Lambert	Nominated	
ASCAP Film and Television Music Awards	Top Box Office Films	David Zippel	Won	
Blockbuster Entertainment Awards	Favorite Animated Family Movie		Nominated	
Blockbuster Entertainment Awards	Favorite Song from a Movie	Michael Bolton – "Go the Distance"	Nominated	
Golden Globe Awards	Best Original Song	"Go the Distance"; Music by Alan Menken; Lyrics by David Zippel	Nominated	
Golden Reel Awards	Best Sound Editing – Animated Feature	Tim Holland, Gary Rydstrom, Marilyn McCoppen, John K. Carr, Pat Jackson, Jeff Jones, James Melton, Mary Helen Leasman, and Marian Wilde	Won	
Golden Reel Awards	Best Sound Editing – Music Animation	Kathleen Fogarty-Bennett and Earl Ghaffari	Nominated	
Golden Screen Awards			Won	
Los Angeles Film Critics Association Awards	Best Animation		Won (Note: Tied with The Spirit of Christmas.)	
Online Film & Television Association Awards	Best Animated Picture	Alice Dewey, Ron Clements, and John Musker	Nominated	
Online Film & Television Association Awards	Best Comedy/Musical Score	Alan Menken and David Zippel	Nominated	
Online Film & Television Association Awards	Best Original Song	"Go the Distance"; Music by Alan Menken; Lyrics by David Zippel	Nominated	
Online Film & Television Association Awards	Best Voice-Over Performance	Danny DeVito	Nominated	
Online Film & Television Association Awards	Best Voice-Over Performance	James Woods	Won	
Young Artist Awards	Best Performance in a Voiceover – TV or Film: Young Actor	Josh Keaton	Nominated	

== Legacy ==
=== Cancelled sequel ===
The sequel Hercules II: The Trojan War was planned. It would have been about Hercules now living in Athens with Megara and their daughter, Hebe. However, when an old friend named Helen is captured by the evil Paris of Troy, Hercules joins the united Greek army as they head out to war. However, this war will create revelations, and Hercules finds an old friend who eventually goes missing. The project was cancelled when John Lasseter was named Disney's new chief creative officer in 2006, after which he cancelled all direct-to-video sequels that Disney had planned.

=== TV series and follow-up film ===
In July 1997, Disney announced a prequel TV show titled Hercules: The Animated Series would premiere in the fall 1998 television season. Produced by Walt Disney Television Animation, the series depicts Hercules's teenage years training with Phil and studying at the Prometheus Academy high school. Tate Donovan and James Woods reprised their original roles as Hercules and Hades, respectively. The series premiered in syndication on August 31, 1998, and on ABC through its Disney's One Saturday Morning block on September 12, 1998. The syndicated run lasted 52 episodes, while the ABC run lasted 13 episodes.

Four episodes of the series were packaged together as the direct-to-video film Hercules: Zero to Hero, released on August 17, 1999. The film features a frame story set after the events of the feature film, with Hercules telling Meg stories from his teenage years.

=== Stage adaptation ===
On February 6, 2019, it was announced that a theatrical adaptation of the film would premiere at the Delacorte Theater in Central Park as part of its annual Shakespeare in the Park festival from August 31 until September 8. Menken and Zippel returned to compose and write the songs, while Kristoffer Diaz wrote the book, Lear deBessonet directed and Chase Brock will choreograph. The cast included Jelani Alladin (Hercules), Roger Bart (Hades), Jeff Hiller (Panic), James Monroe Iglehart (Phil), Ramona Keller (Thalia), Tamika Lawrence (Calliope), Krysta Rodriguez (Meg), and Rema Webb (Terpsichore). A revised version of the musical played the Paper Mill Playhouse in Millburn, New Jersey during the 2022–23 season, from February 9 to March 12, 2023. The revised book was written by Kwame Kwei-Armah and Robert Horn.

A new production of the musical opened at the Neue Flora in Hamburg, Germany on March 24, 2024, and directed by Casey Nicholaw. Hercules opened in London's West End at the Theatre Royal, Drury Lane in the summer of 2025.

=== Live-action remake ===
On April 29, 2020, it was reported that a live-action remake of Hercules is under development at Walt Disney Pictures, with the producers of the CGI remake of The Lion King (Jeffrey Silver and Karen Gilchrist) set to produce the film. Joe and Anthony Russo were to serve as producers on the film through their AGBO banner, with Dave Callaham as screenwriter. On May 7, 2020, the Russo brothers stated that the remake would not be a "literal translation" as they want the film to have new elements yet still being "something that's in the vein of the original and inspired by it".

In June 2022, it was announced that Guy Ritchie, who had previously directed Disney's live-action Aladdin remake, had signed on to direct the film. Joe Russo told GamesRadar+ that the remake would pay homage to the original with a more modern spin on it and revealed that it would also be a modern musical inspired by TikTok.

== See also ==
- Muses in popular culture
- List of films featuring Hercules

== Bibliography ==
- Burchfield, Amy Elizabeth (2013). Going the Distance: Themes of the Hero in Disney in Disney's Hercules (Master of Arts). Provo, Utah: Brigham Young University.
- Rebello, Stephen; Healey, Jane (1997). The Art of Hercules: The Chaos of Creation. Hyperion Books. ISBN 978-0-786-86263-4.
- Thomas, Bob (1997). Disney's Art of Animation: From Mickey Mouse to Hercules. New York: Disney Editions. ISBN 978-0-786-86241-2.
