= Susan Egan =

American actress, singer, and dancer (born 1970)

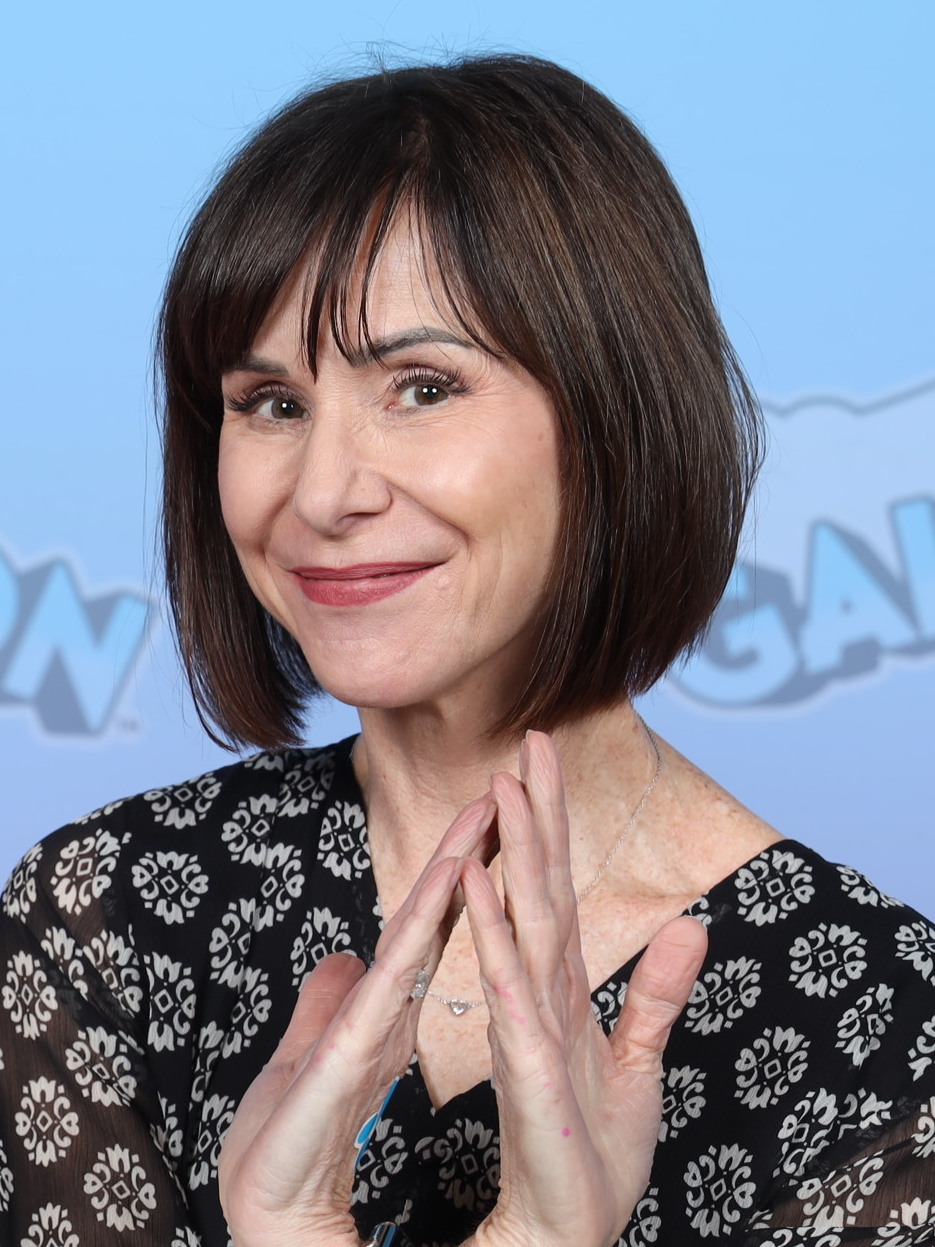
- Egan at GalaxyCon 2023 in Columbus, Ohio
- Born: Susan Farrell Egan; February 18, 1970 (age 56); Seal Beach, California, U.S.
- Education: University of California, Los Angeles
- Occupations: Actress; singer; dancer
- Years active: 1992–present
- Spouse: Robert Hartmann (m. 2005)
- Children: 2

Susan Farrell Egan (born February 18, 1970) is an American actress, singer, and dancer known for her work on the Broadway stage. She is best known for originating the role of Belle in the Broadway musical adaptation of Beauty and the Beast (1994), for providing the voices of Megara in Hercules (1997) and Rose Quartz in Steven Universe, and for voicing the English dubs of Madame Gina in Porco Rosso and Lin in Spirited Away.

== Early life ==
Susan Egan was born in Seal Beach, California, on February 18, 1970. She attended Los Alamitos High School and the co-located Orange County High School of the Arts and UCLA.

== Career ==
=== Stage and other work ===
Egan spent much of her time as a child taking dance, concentrating on ballet and trained as a figure skater from ages five to 10. While attending Los Alamitos High School, the Orange County School of the Arts in Santa Ana, California, and University of California, Los Angeles (UCLA), she began her career acting in local community theaters and civic light operas. While attending UCLA, Egan took time off when Tommy Tune cast her as Kim MacAfee in his touring production of Bye Bye Birdie. After the tour ended, she was cast in the tour of State Fair and soon afterwards won the coveted role of Belle in the original Broadway cast of Beauty and the Beast in 1994, for which she was nominated for the Tony Award for Best Actress in a Musical at the 48th Tony Awards and the Drama Desk Award for Outstanding Actress in a Musical.

On Broadway, Egan portrayed Belle for one year and reprised the role in the Los Angeles production in 1995, along with many of the original Broadway cast members. She also starred portraying characters in leading roles in State Fair, Cabaret, Triumph of Love, and Thoroughly Modern Millie. She has performed in one-woman, cabaret-style concerts at venues across the U.S. including the Orange County Performing Arts Center in Costa Mesa, California and at the Carpenter Performing Arts Center in Long Beach, California. Egan has been the headline act performing with more than 60 symphonies and has appeared at the Hollywood Bowl five times including on June 6, 2016, when she appeared alongside Brad Kane as an opening act for Disney's The Little Mermaid Live show.

Egan produces live stage productions with two companies she manages: Broadway Princess Party, LLC and 10th & Main Productions. She produces Disney Princess - The Concert, Walt Disney Animation Studios: The Concert and other shows often in partnership with Disney Concerts. On November 10, 2025, Egan was named the official godmother of the Disney Destiny, a Disney Cruise Line ship featuring several spaces inspired by characters she has portrayed, including Café Megara. In December 2025, she was a guest narrator at Disney's Candlelight Processional at Walt Disney World. In 2026, Egan was honored with a Disney Legend Award for her contributions to the company.

=== Television ===
On television, Egan is known for her co-starring role as Nikki White (Nikki Cox)'s best friend Mary Campbell in Nikki on The WB.

=== Voice acting ===
Egan's voice has been featured in the English language version of two feature films by Hayao Miyazaki, Spirited Away and Porco Rosso. She is most widely known for voicing Megara in the 1997 film Hercules and reprised her role in the 1998 TV series of the same name in two episodes and also in Kingdom Hearts II and Kingdom Hearts III.

Egan provided Angel (Alyssa Milano)'s singing voice in Lady and the Tramp II: Scamp's Adventure and the voice acting for Rose Quartz on the Cartoon Network animated series Steven Universe along with various other characters.

== Personal life ==
Egan is married to Robert Hartmann and has two daughters. They live in Nashville.

== Filmography ==
Film
Year	Title	Role	Notes
1997	Hercules	Megara	Voice
1999	Man of the Century	Samantha Winter	
2001	Mickey's Magical Christmas: Snowed in at the House of Mouse	Megara	Voice
2001	XCU: Extreme Close Up	Karen Webber	
2001	The Disappearing Girl Trick	Bridget Smith	Short film
2001	Revolution OS	Narrator	Documentary
2001	Lady and the Tramp II: Scamp's Adventure	Angel	Voice (singing), direct-to-video
2001	Spirited Away	Lin	Voice role (2002 English dub)
2004	13 Going on 30	Tracy Hansen	
2005	Porco Rosso	Madame Gina	Voice (English dub)
2014	Achmed Saves America	Ginny	Voice

Television
Year	Title	Role	Notes
1993	Men Don't Tell	Florist	Television film
1998–2000	The Drew Carey Show	Susan/Suzanne	2 episodes
1999	Hercules	Megara	2 episodes
1999	Great Performances	Performer (Mountaiin Greenry & Where or When)	AEpisode: “Rodger & Hart Story: Thou Swell, Thou Witty”
2000–2002	Nikki	Mary Campbell	40 episodes
2002	NYPD Blue	Jennifer Martin	Episode: "Guns & Hoses"
2002	Gotta Kick It Up!	Heather Bartlett	Television film
2002	Haunted	E.R. Doctor	Episode: "Pilot"
2005	Numb3rs	Becky Burdick	Episode: "Prime Suspect"
2009	House	Audrey Greenwald	Episode: "The Social Contract"
2014–2019	Steven Universe	Rose Quartz/Pink Diamond; Pebbles; Tiny Floating Whale; Patient	14 episodes; Voice
2015	Modern Family	Miss Ford	Episode: "Summer Lovin'"
2019	Steven Universe Future	Rose Quartz	Episode: "Rose Buds"; Archived voice from Steven Universe
2020	Amphibia	Renee Frodgers	Voice; episode: "A Caravan Named Desire"
2021–2022	The Simpsons	The "You'll Never Sleep Again" singer Singing Tree	Voice; episodes: "Treehouse of Horror XXXII" "Meat Is Murder"
2022	Bjorn the Last Unicorn	Becca	Voice

Video Games
Year	Title	Role	Notes
2006	Kingdom Hearts II	Megara	
2019	Kingdom Hearts III	Megara	
2023	Disney Speedstorm	Megara	

== Broadway and stage ==
Source: Internet Broadway Database

- Bye Bye Birdie (1992, U.S. Tour as Kim MacAfee)
- State Fair (1992, tour; 1996, replacement Margy Frake)
- Beauty and the Beast (1994, Belle)
- The Sound of Music (1996, Maria von Trapp)
- Triumph of Love (1997, Princess Léonide)
- South Pacific (1998, Nellie Forbush, Sacramento Music Circus)
- Cabaret (1998 revival) (various, 1999, 2000, 2003, Sally Bowles)
- Putting It Together (1999, Mark Taper Forum, Los Angeles)
- The Unsinkable Molly Brown (2002, Molly Brown, Sacramento Music Circus)
- Amy's View (2002, Amy Thomas, International City Theatre)
- Thoroughly Modern Millie (2004, replacement Millie Dillmount)
- Chess (2007, a concert as Svetlana Sergievsky)

== Discography ==
- 2002: So Far...
- 2004: Coffee House
- 2005: All That & More
- 2006: Winter Tracks
- 2007: Susan Egan Live!
- 2011: Secret of Happiness (includes a "Nina Doesn't Care" video, Brian Haner music video, filmed in 2011)
- 2015: Softly
