= List of The Penguins of Madagascar episodes =

This is a list of episodes for Nickelodeon's animated television series, The Penguins of Madagascar. As of January 4, 2016, 149 original episodes have aired, with most of the episodes to date being aired in pairs. Aside from eight double-length specials and one quadruple-length special, the running time for each episode is 11 minutes.

== Series overview ==
Season	Episodes		Originally released		
Season	Episodes		First released	Last released	Network
1	48		November 28, 2008	February 15, 2010	Nickelodeon
2	68		March 13, 2010	March 31, 2012	Nickelodeon
3	33	26	April 16, 2012	November 10, 2012	Nickelodeon
3	33	7	December 24, 2013	January 4, 2016	Nicktoons

== Episodes ==
=== Season 1 (2008–10) ===
No. overall	No. in season	Title	Written by	Storyboard by	Original release date	Prod. code	US viewers (millions)
1	1	"Gone in a Flash"	Todd Garfield	Sean Kreiner	November 28, 2008	101b	N/A
2	2	"Launchtime"	Ron Anderson	Johane Matte	March 28, 2009	103a	6.1
3	3	"Haunted Habitat"	Bob Schooley & Mark McCorkle	Christo Stamboliev	March 28, 2009	103b	6.1
4	4	"Operation: Plush & Cover"	Eddie Guzelian	Dean Kelly	March 30, 2009	104a	4.9
5	5	"Happy King Julien Day!"	Laura Gutin	Christo Stamboliev	March 31, 2009	104b	6.4
6	6	"Paternal Egg-Stinct"	Todd Garfield	Tom Bernardo	April 1, 2009	105a	4.0
7	7	"Assault & Batteries"	Bill Motz & Bob Roth	Johane Matte	April 2, 2009	105b	4.0
8	8	"Penguiner Takes All"	John Behnke & Rob Humphrey	Dean Kelly	April 6, 2009	106a	4.0
9	9	"Two Feet High and Rising"	Matt Negrete	Nick Filippi and Caleb Meurer	April 7, 2009	106b	3.6
10	10	"Tangled in the Web"	Nate Knetchel	Tom Bernardo	April 8, 2009	102a	N/A
11	11	"Crown Fools"	Bob Schooley & Mark McCorkle	Jay Shultz	April 9, 2009	102b	3.8
12	12	"The Hidden"	Chris Neuhahn and Scott Kreamer	Johane Matte	April 18, 2009	107a	4.9
13	13	"Kingdom Come"	Eddie Guzelian	Christo Stamboliev	April 18, 2009	107b	4.9
14	14	"Little Zoo Coupe"	Bill Motz & Bob Roth	Tom Bernardo	April 24, 2009	108a	4.8
15	15	"All Choked Up"	Brandon Sawyer	Christo Stamboliev	April 24, 2009	108b	4.8
16	16	"Popcorn Panic"	Paul Rugg and Bob Schooley & Mark McCorkle	Bret Haaland and Tom Bernardo	May 9, 2009 (Note: This episode was also released on DVD on February 6, 2009 as part of the Double DVD Pack of Madagascar: Escape 2 Africa.)	101a	3.8
17	17	"Go Fish"	Eddie Guzelian	Dean Kelly	May 30, 2009	109a	3.6
18	18	"Miracle on Ice"	Bill Motz & Bob Roth	Caleb Meurer and Doug Murphy	May 30, 2009	109b	3.8
19	19	"Needle Point"	Bill Motz & Bob Roth	Tom Bernardo	June 6, 2009	110a	3.9
20	20	"Eclipsed"	Kim Duran and Bob Schooley & Mark McCorkle	Johane Matte	June 6, 2009	110b	3.9
21	21	"Mort Unbound"	Bill Motz & Bob Roth	Caleb Meurer	June 26, 2009	111a	N/A
22	22	"Roomies"	Madellaine Paxson	Doug Murphy	June 26, 2009	111b	N/A
23	23	"Misfortune Cookie"	Bill Motz & Bob Roth	Caleb Meurer	August 1, 2009	114a	N/A
24	24	"Lemur See, Lemur Do"	Bill Motz & Bob Roth	Christo Stamboliev	August 1, 2009	112b	N/A
25	25	"Roger Dodger"	Eddie Guzelian	Dean Kelly	August 17, 2009	112a	N/A
26	26	"Skorca!"	Brandon Sawyer	Tom Bernardo	August 17, 2009	115a	N/A
27	27	"Otter Gone Wild"	John Behnke & Rob Humphrey	Johane Matte	August 18, 2009	113a	N/A
28	28	"Cat's Cradle"	Brandon Sawyer	Tom Bernardo	August 19, 2009	113b	N/A
29	29	"Monkey Love"	Nick Stanton & Devin Bunje	Doug Murphy	August 20, 2009	114b	N/A
30	30	"Tagged"	Eddie Guzelian	Dean Kelly, Sean Kreiner and Johane Matte	August 21, 2009	115b	N/A
31	31	"What Goes Around"	Brandon Sawyer	Sean Kreiner	September 19, 2009	116a	4.0
32	32	"Mask of the Raccoon"	Bill Motz & Bob Roth	Doug Murphy	September 19, 2009	116b	3.8
33	33	"Out of the Groove"	Bill Motz & Bob Roth	Wolf-Rüdiger Bloss	October 12, 2009	118a	3.7
34	34	"Jungle Law"	Brandon Sawyer	Christo Stamboliev	October 12, 2009	118b	3.7
35	35	"I Was a Penguin Zombie"	Brandon Sawyer	Wolf-Rüdiger Bloss	October 24, 2009	119a	5.1
36	36	"Sting Operation"	Brandon Sawyer	Dean Kelly	October 24, 2009	119b	5.1
37	37	"All King, No Kingdom"	Bill Motz & Bob Roth	Doug Murphy	November 14, 2009	121a	4.4
38	38	"Untouchable"	Bill Motz & Bob Roth	Christo Stamboliev	November 14, 2009	121b	4.4
39	39	"Over Phil"	Doug Molitor	Doug Murphy	November 27, 2009	123b	4.5
40	40	"Miss Understanding"	Brandon Sawyer	Sean Kreiner	November 27, 2009	123a	4.5
41	41	"An Elephant Never Forgets"	Brandon Sawyer	Dean Kelly	December 5, 2009	122a	3.9
42	42	"Otter Things Have Happened"	Bill Motz & Bob Roth	Tom Bernardo	December 5, 2009	122b	3.9
43	43	"Zoo Tube"	Justin Charlebois	Dean Kelly and Kirk Hansen	January 2, 2010	124b	4.3
44	44	"Snakehead!"	Bill Motz & Bob Roth	Doug Murphy	January 2, 2010	125a	4.3
45	45	"Jiggles"	Bob Schooley & Mark McCorkle	Christo Stamboliev	January 16, 2010	124a	4.2
46	46	"The Falcon and the Snow Job"	Brandon Sawyer	Tom Bernardo	February 6, 2010	125b	5.2
47	47	"The Penguin Stays in the Picture"	Bill Motz & Bob Roth	Sean Kreiner	February 6, 2010	126a	5.2
48	48	"Dr. Blowhole's Revenge"	Bob Schooley & Mark McCorkle	Christo Stamboliev, Dave Knott and Dean Kelly; Johane Matte and Jay Shultz (additionals)	February 15, 2010 (Note: This episode was first released in Operation DVD Premiere on February 9, 2010.)	117	4.0

=== Season 2 (2010–12) ===
No. overall	No. in season	Title	Written by	Storyboard by	Original release date	Prod. code	US viewers (millions)
49	1	"The Red Squirrel"	Brandon Sawyer	Wolf-Rüdiger Bloss	March 13, 2010	201a	4.3
50	2	"It's About Time"	Bill Motz & Bob Roth	David Chlystek	March 13, 2010	201b	4.3
51	3	"Gator Watch"	Bill Motz & Bob Roth	Wolf-Rüdiger Bloss	May 15, 2010	204a	3.8
52	4	"In the Line of Doody"	Brandon Sawyer	Steve Loter	May 15, 2010	204b	3.8
53	5	"Can't Touch This"	Bill Motz & Bob Roth	Tom Bernardo	June 19, 2010	207a	3.7
54	6	"Hard Boiled Eggy"	Brandon Sawyer	Sean Kreiner, Fred Osmond and Christo Stamboliev	June 19, 2010	207b	3.7
55	7	"The Lost Treasure of the Golden Squirrel"	Eddie Guzelian	Tom Bernardo and Christo Stamboliev	July 19, 2010	205	N/A
56	8	"Fit to Print"	Eddie Guzelian	Steve Loter	July 19, 2010	209b	N/A
57	9	"Operation: Cooties"	Ivory Floyd	Tom Bernardo and Sean Kreiner	July 19, 2010	210a	N/A
58	10	"Mr. Tux"	Eddie Guzelian	Wolf-Rüdiger Bloss	July 19, 2010	211a	N/A
59	11	"Concrete Jungle Survival"	Brandon Sawyer	Steve Loter	July 19, 2010	211b	N/A
60	12	"Stop Bugging Me"	Bill Motz & Bob Roth	Doug Murphy	September 4, 2010	203a	N/A
61	13	"Field Tripped"	Todd Garfield	Sean Kreiner	September 4, 2010	203b	N/A
62	14	"Badger Pride"	Bill Motz & Bob Roth	Tom Bernardo	September 4, 2010	212b	N/A
63	15	"Kaboom and Kabust"	Brandon Sawyer	Christo Stamboliev	September 11, 2010	202a	3.9
64	16	"The Helmet"	John Behnke & Rob Humphrey	Steve Loter	September 11, 2010 (Note: This episode was first released in Happy King Julien Day DVD on August 10, 2010)	202b	3.9
65	17	"Night and Dazed"	Kurt Weldon	Emmanuel Deligiannis	September 18, 2010	206a	4.2
66	18	"The Big Squeeze"	Dean Stefan	Sean Kreiner	September 18, 2010 (Note: This episode was first released in New to the Zoo DVD on August 10, 2010.)	206b	4.2
67	19	"Wishful Thinking"	Bill Motz & Bob Roth	Wolf-Rüdiger Bloss	October 2, 2010	208a	3.8
68	20	"April Fools"	Bill Motz & Bob Roth	Emmanuel Deligiannis	October 2, 2010	208b	3.8
69	21	"Hello, Dollface"	Brandon Sawyer	Sean Kreiner	October 9, 2010	209a	3.6
70	22	"Huffin and Puffin"	Bill Motz & Bob Roth	Wolf-Rüdiger Bloss	October 9, 2010	126b	3.6
71	23	"Invention Intervention"	Thomas Hart	Fred Osmond	October 16, 2010	213a	N/A
72	24	"Cradle and All"	Justin Charlebois	Emmanuel Deligiannis	October 16, 2010	213b	N/A
73	25	"Driven to the Brink"	Bill Motz & Bob Roth	Fred Osmond	October 23, 2010 (Note: This episode was first released on I Was a Penguin Zombie DVD on October 5, 2010.)	210b	N/A
74	26	"Friend-in-a-Box"	Bill Motz & Bob Roth	Sean Kreiner	October 23, 2010	212a	N/A
75	27	"Work Order"	Eddie Guzelian	Emmanuel Deligiannis	November 6, 2010	215a	3.8
76	28	"Hot Ice"	Ross Beeley	Tom Bernardo	November 6, 2010	215b	3.8
77	29	"Command Crisis"	Todd Garfield	Tom Bernardo	November 27, 2010	120a	N/A
78	30	"Truth Ache"	Bill Motz & Bob Roth	Sean Kreiner	November 27, 2010	120b	N/A
79	31	"The All Nighter Before Christmas"	Brandon Sawyer	Wolf-Rüdiger Bloss, Steve Loter, Emmanuel Deligiannis and Tom Bernardo	December 12, 2010	214	N/A
80	32	"Whispers and Coups"	Bill Motz & Bob Roth	Sean Kreiner	January 15, 2011	216a	N/A
81	33	"Brush with Danger!"	John Behnke & Rob Humphrey	Fred Osmond	January 15, 2011	216b	N/A
82	34	"Love Hurts"	Brandon Sawyer	Tom Bernardo	February 12, 2011	218b	N/A
83	35	"The Officer X Factor"	Tom Krajewski and Eddie Guzelian	Emmanuel Deligiannis	February 12, 2011	218a	N/A
84	36	"Brain Drain"	Bill Motz & Bob Roth	Tom Bernardo	February 26, 2011	221b	N/A
85	37	"Right Hand Man"	Eddie Guzelian	Emmanuel Deligiannis	February 26, 2011	221a	N/A
86	38	"Danger Wears a Cape"	Brandon Sawyer	Emmanuel Deligiannis and Tom Bernardo	March 19, 2011	224a	N/A
87	39	"Operation: Break-speare"	Jess Winfield	Sean Kreiner	March 19, 2011	224b	N/A
88	40	"Rat Fink"	Brandon Sawyer	Sunil Hall	March 19, 2011	220b	N/A
89	41	"Kanga Management"	Kurt Weldon	Fred Osmond	March 19, 2011	220a	N/A
90	42	"King Julien for a Day"	Derek Iversen and Eddie Guzelian	Tom Bernardo, Luke Cormican and Fred Osmond	March 26, 2011	222b	N/A
91	43	"Maurice at Peace"	Thomas Hart	Sunil Hall	March 26, 2011	223b	N/A
92	44	"Cute-astrophe"	Brandon Sawyer	Sean Kreiner	April 2, 2011	222a	3.8
93	45	"Operation: Neighbor Swap"	Bill Motz & Bob Roth	Fred Osmond	June 13, 2011	225a	N/A
94	46	"All Tied Up With a Boa"	Brandon Sawyer	Emmanuel Deligiannis	June 14, 2011	226b	N/A
95	47	"Rock-a-Bye Birdie"	Gabriel Garza	Sunil Hall	June 15, 2011	226a	N/A
96	48	"Herring Impaired"	Brandon Sawyer	Wolf-Rüdiger Bloss	June 16, 2011	225b	N/A
97	49	"A Visit from Uncle Nigel"	Bill Motz & Bob Roth	Wolf-Rüdiger Bloss	June 17, 2011	223a	N/A
98	50	"The Hoboken Surprise" "Hoboken Surprise"	Brandon Sawyer	Sunil Hall and Emmanuel Deligiannis	August 20, 2011	229	3.8
99	51	"The Return of the Revenge of Dr. Blowhole"	Bob Schooley & Mark McCorkle	Fred Osmond, Matt Engstrom, Tom Bernardo and Sean Kreiner	September 9, 2011	234-235	N/A
100	52	"Pets Peeved" "Pet's Peeved"	Brandon Sawyer	Fred Osmond	September 24, 2011	230a	N/A
101	53	"Byte-Sized" "Byte - Sized"	Evelyn Gabai	Matt Engstrom	September 24, 2011	230b	N/A
102	54	"Operation: Good Deed"	Bill Motz & Bob Roth	Sean Kreiner	October 8, 2011	219a	3.5
103	55	"When the Chips are Down"	Bill Motz & Bob Roth	Wolf-Rüdiger Bloss	October 8, 2011	219b	3.5
104	56	"Time Out"	John Behnke	Sunil Hall	October 10, 2011	233a	N/A
105	57	"Our Man in Grrfurjiclestan"	Brandon Sawyer	Emmanuel Deligiannis	October 10, 2011	233b	N/A
106	58	"Gut Instinct"	Bill Motz & Bob Roth	Fred Osmond	October 10, 2011	236a	N/A
107	59	"I Know Why the Caged Bird Goes Insane"	Brandon Sawyer	Matt Engstrom	October 10, 2011	236b	N/A
108	60	"The Big S.T.A.N.K." "The Big Stank"	Eddie Guzelian	Tom Bernardo	November 26, 2011	231b	N/A
109	61	"Arch-Enemy" "Arch Enemy"	Bill Motz & Bob Roth	Sunil Hall	November 26, 2011	231a	N/A
110	62	"Operation: Antarctica"	Brandon Sawyer	Sunil Hall, Emmanuel Deligiannis and Tom Bernardo	January 16, 2012	237	N/A
111	63	"The Big Move"	Thomas Hart	Tom Bernardo and Carson Kugler	January 16, 2012	239a	N/A
112	64	"Endangerous Species"	Gabriel Garza	Sean Kreiner	January 16, 2012	239b	N/A
113	65	"Loathe at First Sight"	Justin Charlebois	Fred Osmond	February 11, 2012	227a	N/A
114	66	"The Trouble With Jiggles"	John Behnke & Rob Humphrey	Sean Kreiner	February 11, 2012	227b	N/A
115	67	"Alienated"	Bill Motz & Bob Roth	Sunil Hall and Robert Lence	March 31, 2012	217a	N/A
116	68	"The Most Dangerous Game Night"	Brandon Sawyer	Emmanuel Deligiannis and Brian Hatfield	March 31, 2012	232a	N/A

=== Season 3 (2012–15) ===
No. overall	No. in season	Title	Written by	Original release date	Prod. code	US viewers (millions)
Nickelodeon
117	1	"Feline Fervor"	Storyboarded by : Jean-Sebastien Duclos; Tom Bernardo (additional); Written by : Justin Charlebois	April 16, 2012	304a	3.3
118	2	"King Me"	Storyboarded by : Fred Osmond; Written by : Gabriel Garza	April 17, 2012	307a	N/A
119	3	"The Otter Woman"	Storyboarded by : Wolf-Rüdiger Bloss; Written by : Kim Duran	April 18, 2012	217b	N/A
120	4	"Action Reaction"	Storyboarded by : Fred Osmond; Written by : Gabriel Garza	April 19, 2012	304b	N/A
121	5	"Thumb Drive"	Storyboarded by : Emmanuel Deligiannis; Written by : Bill Motz & Bob Roth	April 20, 2012	305b	2.3
122	6	"Operation: Big Blue Marble"	Storyboarded by : Tom Bernardo and Sean Kreiner; Written by : Bill Motz & Bob Roth	April 22, 2012	303	3.3
123	7	"Hair Apparent"	Storyboarded by : Wolf-Rüdiger Bloss; Written by : Jim Peronto	May 6, 2012	228a	2.9
124	8	"Love Takes Flightless"	Storyboarded by : Tom Bernardo; Written by : Bill Motz & Bob Roth	May 6, 2012	228b	2.9
125	9	"Smotherly Love"	Storyboarded by : Jeremy Bernstein and Fred Osmond; Written by : Michael Ludy	May 13, 2012	301b	2.9
126	10	"Littlefoot"	Storyboarded by : Tom Bernardo, Matt Engstrom and Fred Osmond; Written by : Mark Palmer	May 13, 2012	301a	2.9
127	11	"Antics on Ice"	Storyboarded by : Sean Kreiner; Written by : Bill Motz & Bob Roth	May 20, 2012	306a	2.6
128	12	"Showdown on Fairway 18"	Storyboarded by : Tom Bernardo and Kenji Ono; Written by : Gabriel Garza	May 20, 2012	306b	2.6
129	13	"Street Smarts"	Storyboarded by : Sean Kreiner; Written by : James W. Bates	May 27, 2012	232b	2.5
130	14	"Nighty Night Ninja"	Storyboarded by : Tom Bernardo; Written by : Ivory Floyd	May 27, 2012	238a	2.5
131	15	"A Kipper for Skipper"	Storyboarded by : Sunil Hall; Written by : Steve Aranguren	June 3, 2012	302a	2.5
132	16	"High Moltage"	Storyboarded by : Emmanuel Deligiannis; Written by : Brandon Sawyer	June 3, 2012	302b	2.5
133	17	"Nuts to You"	Storyboarded by : Jeremy Bernstein; Written by : Brandon Sawyer	June 10, 2012	310a	2.3
134	18	"The Terror of Madagascar"	Storyboarded by : Emmanuel Deligiannis; Written by : Gabriel Garza	June 10, 2012	310b	2.3
135	19	"Mental Hen"	Storyboarded by : Jeremy Bernstein and Sunil Hall; Written by : Brandon Sawyer	June 17, 2012	305a	2.4
136	20	"Siege the Day"	Storyboarded by : Sean Kreiner, Javier Secaduras, Jeremy Bernstein and Brian Morante; Written by : Bill Motz & Bob Roth	June 17, 2012 (Note: This episode was first released on Operation: Get Ducky DVD on February 14, 2012.)	238b	2.4
137	21	"P.E.L.T."	Storyboarded by : Sean Kreiner; Written by : Justin Charlebois	July 29, 2012	311b	1.9
138	22	"Private and the Winky Factory"	Storyboarded by : Jean-Sebastian Duclos; Written by : Brandon Sawyer	July 29, 2012	307b	1.9
139	23	"Best Laid Plantains"	Storyboarded by : Kenji Ono and Jeremy Bernstein; Written by : Bill Motz & Bob Roth	November 3, 2012	311a	2.5
140	24	"Skipper Makes Perfect"	Storyboarded by : Jean-Sebastian Duclos and Tom Bernardo; Written by : Brandon Sawyer	November 3, 2012	313b	2.5
141	25	"Marble Jarhead"	Storyboarded by : Kenji Ono and Fred Osmond; Written by : Brandon Sawyer	November 10, 2012	315a	2.12
142	26	"Goodnight and Good Chuck"	Storyboarded by : Sean Kreiner; Written by : Gabriel Garza	November 10, 2012	315b	2.12
Nicktoons
143	27	"Tunnel of Love"	Storyboarded by : Fred Osmond; Written by : Justin Charlebois	February 14, 2015	313a	0.13
144	28	"Best Foes"	Storyboarded by : Sean Kreiner; Written by : Gabriel Garza	October 10, 2015	308a	N/A
145	29	"Night of the Vesuviuses"	Storyboarded by : Fred Osmond; Written by : Bill Motz & Bob Roth	October 10, 2015	308b	N/A
146	30	"The Penguin Who Loved Me"	Storyboarded by : Tom Bernardo, Jeremy Bernstein and Emmanuel Deligiannis; Written by : Bill Motz & Bob Roth	October 11, 2015	314	N/A
147	31	"Operation: Lunacorn Apocalypse"	Storyboarded by : Jean-Sebastian Duclos and Kenji Ono; Written by : Brandon Sawyer	October 11, 2015	309	N/A
148	32	"Operation: Swap-panzee"	Storyboarded by : Jeremy Bernstein; Written by : Justin Charliebois	January 4, 2016	312a	0.18
149	33	"Snowmageddon"	Storyboarded by : Emmanuel Deligiannis; Written by : Bill Motz & Bob Roth	January 4, 2016 (Note: This episode was first released in Operation: Special Delivery DVD on November 4, 2014.)	312b	0.18

== Home media ==
The Penguins of Madagascar home video releases
Season		Episodes	Release dates
Season		Episodes	Region 1
1	2008–10	48	Operation: DVD Premiere: February 9, 2010; Episode(s): "Launchtime" • "Tangled in the Web" • "The Hidden" • "All Choked Up" • "Go Fish" • "Needle Point" • "Roomies" • "Dr. Blowhole's Revenge" Happy King Julien Day!: August 10, 2010; Episode(s): "Operation: Plush & Cover" • "Happy King Julien Day!" • "Assault & Batteries" • "Crown Fools" • "Kingdom Come" • "Jungle Law" • "All King, No Kingdom" New to the Zoo: August 10, 2010; Episode(s): "Skorca!" • "Cat's Cradle" • "Out of the Groove" • "Untouchable" • "Jiggles" I Was a Penguin Zombie: October 5, 2010; Episode(s): "Haunted Habitat" • "Eclipsed" • "Mort Unbound" • "Misfortune Cookie" • "Lemur See, Lemur Do" • "I Was a Penguin Zombie" All-Nighter Before Xmas: October 11, 2011; Episode(s): "Miracle on Ice" Operation: Blowhole: January 10, 2012; Episode(s): "Dr. Blowhole's Revenge" Operation: Get Ducky: February 14, 2012; Episode(s): "Paternal Egg-Stinct" • "Two Feet High and Rising" • "Otter Gone Wild" • "Sting Operation" Operation: Antarctica: October 30, 2012; Episode(s): "Penguiner Takes All" • "Roger Dodger" • "Snakehead!" • "The Falcon and the Snow Job" Operation: Special Delivery: November 4, 2014; Episode(s): "Mask of the Raccoon"
2	2010–12	68	Operation: DVD Premiere: February 9, 2010; Episode(s): "Command Crisis" • "Truth Ache" Happy King Julien Day!: August 10, 2010; Episode(s): "The Helmet" New to the Zoo: August 10, 2010; Episode(s): "The Red Squirrel" • "In the Line of Doody" • "The Big Squeeze" I Was a Penguin Zombie: October 5, 2010; Episode(s): "It's About Time" • "Driven to the Brink" All-Nighter Before Xmas: October 11, 2011; Episode(s): "The Lost Treasure of the Golden Squirrel" • "Wishful Thinking" • "The All Nighter Before Christmas" • "The Hoboken Surprise" • "Operation: Good Deed" Operation: Blowhole: January 10, 2012; Episode(s): "The Return of the Revenge of Dr. Blowhole" Operation: Get Ducky: February 14, 2012; Episode(s): "Hard Boiled Eggy" • "April Fools" • "Operation: Neighbor Swap" Operation: Antarctica: October 30, 2012; Episode(s): "Concrete Jungle Survival" • "Work Order" • "Operation: Antarctica" Operation: Special Delivery: November 4, 2014; Episode(s): "Mr. Tux" • "Hello, Dollface" • "Hot Ice" • "The All Nighter Before Christmas" • "A Visit from Uncle Nigel" • "The Big Move"
3	2012–15	33	Operation: Get Ducky: February 14, 2012; Episode(s): "Siege the Day" Operation: Special Delivery: November 4, 2014; Episode(s): "Antics on Ice" • "Snowmageddon"

- Note: The first two volumes Operation: DVD Premiere and Happy King Julien Day! were released in both regions one and four.
