= List of Goof Troop episodes =

The following is an episode list for the Walt Disney Television Animation produced series Goof Troop. The series, which featured the antics and mis-adventures of Goofy, his son Max and his neighbor Pete, along with Pete's family (wife Peg, son P.J. and daughter Pistol), ran for a total of 78 episodes and one Christmas special.

Goof Troop was originally previewed on The Disney Channel. An hour-long premiere special "Forever Goof" aired in syndication in September 1992. On September 7, the series became part of The Disney Afternoon, where 65 episodes (including the premiere, rerun in two parts) were broadcast during September–December 1992. At the same time, another set of 13 episodes aired on ABC's Saturday morning lineup, simply titled ABC Saturday Morning, concurrent with the weekday syndicated episodes. In late 1992, a primetime Christmas special was aired in syndication, separate from the standard 78 episodes.

== Series overview ==
Season	Episodes	Originally released		
Season	Episodes	First released	Last released	Network
The Disney Afternoon	65	September 7, 1992	December 4, 1992	Syndication
ABC	13	September 12, 1992	December 5, 1992	ABC
Special	1	November 26, 1992		Syndication
Films	2	April 7, 1995	February 29, 2000	—N/a

== Episodes ==
=== The Disney Afternoon (1992) ===
No.	Title	Directed by	Written by	Storyboard by	Original release date	Prod. code	Packaging code
1	"Everything's Coming Up Goofy"	Mike Svayko and Bob Zamboni	Marion Wells	Jan Green, John Norton and Curt Walstead	September 5, 1992 ("Forever Goof" airing) (Note: Airing dates vary in syndicated markets. Here are a few examples.: Olathe News listed the air date as September 4 in the market located at Olathe.; Fort Worth Star-Telegram listed it as September 6 in the market located at Fort Worth.; The Houston Post listed it as September 7 in the market located at Houston.); October 21, 1992 (The Disney Afternoon rerun)	AU8	GT-01
Goofy moves to Spoonerville with Max and next door to old pal Pete.
2	"Good Neighbor Goof"	Mitch Rochon and Woody Yocum	Cathryn Perdue, Steve Sustarsic and Jeff Saylor	Larry Eikleberry and Sharon Forward	September 5, 1992 ("Forever Goof" airing); October 22, 1992 (The Disney Afternoon rerun)	AU10	GT-02
P.J. and Max are prohibited by their dads from hanging out with each other. The boys try to find a way to get them to make up so everyone can be happy, but Pete does not seem to agree with Goofy's presence, so the boys resort to an all-out show up contest, forcing Pete and Goofy to reconcile.
3	"Axed by Addition"	Terence Harrison and Bob Shellhorn	Marion Wells	Viki Anderson, Kathleen Carr, Craig Kemplin, Denise Koyama and Curt Walstead	September 7, 1992	FR29	GT-03
P.J. is afraid of being grounded by his dad for a bad report card, so he has fun like it's his last day on Earth. Note: Goofy has a cameo role for this episode. Absent: Pistol.
4	"Unreal Estate"	Mircea Mantta, Mike Svayko and Bob Zamboni	Cathryn Perdue	Don MacKinnon	September 8, 1992	AU7	GT-04
Pete spends the money Peg gave him to pay the handyman on a state-of-the-art fish finder so he hires Goofy as a handyman to paint a real estate property. Absent: Max and P.J.
5	"You Camp Take It with You"	Mircea Mantta and Bob Zamboni	Julia Jane Lewald and Bruce Talkington	Larry Eikleberry, George Goode and Jan Green	September 9, 1992	AU2	GT-05
Peg believes that Pete and Goofy should spend more time with the boys and not let them waste their summer vacation. So Pete and Goofy decide to take the boys on a camping trip.
6	"Midnight Movie Madness"	Mircea Mantta and Bob Zamboni	Rich Fogel and Mark Seidenberg	Viki Anderson, Hank Tucker and Curt Walstead	September 10, 1992	AU1	GT-06
After seeing a scary movie, Max and P.J. fear that they are being followed by a killer. Pete finds out and starts to make their fears come true by pretending that he is the killer.
7	"Counterfeit Goof"	Mircea Mantta and Bob Zamboni	Stephen Levi and Bruce Talkington	Holly Forsyth and John Norton	September 11, 1992	KC11	GT-08
Pete hires Goofy and Max to wallpaper his house, but when Goofy runs out of wallpapering supplies he is out to get some more but ends up unknowingly buying the supplies with counterfeit money. Now he has to deal with counterfeiters who are out to get him. Absent: P.J., Pistol and Peg.
8	"O, R-V, I N-V U"	Mircea Mantta, Mike Svayko and Bob Zamboni	Laurie Sutton and Jymn Magon	Larry Eikleberry, Robert Fuentes, John Norton and Curt Walstead	September 14, 1992	AU16	GT-09
When Max wants Pete to start liking him so that he can hang around with P.J. more, he helps Pete design an RV, but in the process, he becomes friends with Pete leaving P.J. out.
9	"Meanwhile, Back at the Ramp"	Mitch Rochon and Mike Svayko	Cathryn Perdue	Jan Green and Curt Walstead	September 15, 1992	FANZ12	GT-10
Max is upset that Goofy has never won any awards and has no career with his upcoming class reunion. Meanwhile, Pete, in an attempt to achieve more customers at his used car lot, sets up the biggest half-pipe in the world, and hires a skateboarding legend to ride down it. The skateboard legend is too terrified of the ramp's height, so he quits. Pete needs somebody to ride down it, so he offers an award for the individual who does it. Goofy snatches up this offer, and plans to ride down it. Max is excited, but realizes that Goofy can't skateboard, so he and P.J. dress up like him and go in his place.
10	"Close Encounters of the Weird Mime"	Mircea Mantta, Charles A. Nichols, Mike Svayko and Bob Zamboni	Jeff Saylor	Kirk Hanson, Robert Souza and Curt Walstead	September 16, 1992	AU27	GT-11
It's an alien invasion! For Pete, not really, but a messed-up science project seems to make people think that. Note: In one scene, Donald Duck is shown.
11	"Slightly Dinghy"	Mircea Mantta, Mike Svayko and Bob Zamboni	Mark McCorkle and Robert Schooley	Holly Forsyth, John Norton, Swinton Scott and Andre Van Morisse	September 17, 1992	AU15	GT-12
Max wants to find a sunken treasure. Absent: Peg and Pistol.
12	"Cabana Fever"	Mircea Mantta, Bob Zamboni, Vincente Bassols and Woody Yocum	Chuck Tately and Jymn Magon	Larry Eikleberry, Robert Fuentes, Kirk Hansen, John Norton and Andre Van Morisse	September 18, 1992	KC9	GT-13
Pete gets away from it all to a deserted island, where his joy is ruined when Goofy shows up.
13	"Where There's Smoke, There's Goof"	Mircea Mantta and Mike Svayko	Kent Wadsworth	Larry Eikleberry, Jan Green and John Norton	September 21, 1992	AU21	GT-15
Goofy and Max become their town's new firemen. Absent: Pistol.
14	"Date with Destiny"	Mitch Rochon and Mike Svayko	Stephen Levi and Bruce Talkington	Fred Lucky, Roy Shishido, Wendell Washer and Dave Williams	September 22, 1992	AU28	GT-16
When Max says Goofy is getting married (to avoid an awkward moment at school), Peg sends Pete out to find Goofy's ideal match. But when Pete can't find one, he sets up Goofy with an unsuspecting maintenance woman.
15	"Hot Air"	Mircea Mantta, Mike Svayko and Bob Zamboni	Mirith Schilder and Bruce Talkington	Larry Eikleberry, John Norton and Dave Williams	September 23, 1992	KC14	GT-17
After the boys build a glider, Pistol want to fly in it, but they say she is too young. So Goofy takes her to an air show where she ends up saving Pete's life. Absent: Peg
16	"Take Me Out of the Ball Game"	Russell E. Mooney and Terence Harrison	Marion Wells	Larry Eikleberry and Sharon Forward	September 24, 1992	AU37	GT-18
Pete and Goofy argue about their boys on the baseball team, much to the boys' dismay. Their coach is the same coach who expelled their fathers from baseball 30 years ago. Absent: Pistol.
17	"Wrecks, Lies & Videotape"	Mitch Rochon and Woody Yocum	Jan Strnad	Jill Colbert, David Williams and Roy Shishido	September 25, 1992	AU44	GT-19
Max tapes Goofy for the TV show "America's Most Painful Home Videos" to win a prize, but Pete steals the tape to win the prize himself.
18	"Max-imum Protection"	Vincente Bassols, Mircea Mantta, Mike Svayko and Bob Zamboni	Steve Edelman, Mallory Tarcher and Cathryn Perdue	George Goode, Kirk Hanson, Curt Walstead and Roy Wilson	September 28, 1992	KC30	GT-21
Max fears that his house will be robbed, but when he asks Goofy to get a security system, he refuses. Max decides the best place to be is at Pete's house because they just go the latest in burglar prevention. But Pete doesn't know the security service is run by burglars.
19	"Goofin' Hood and His Melancholy Men"	Charles A. Nichols, Mike Svayko and Bob Zamboni	Dean Stefan and Bruce Talkington	Viki Anderson, Larry Eikleberry and John Norton	September 29, 1992	SW46	GT-22
To interest Max in history, Goofy tells him a story about one of his many ancestors. Pete is the evil Sheriff of Nottingham! Absent: Peg and P.J.
20	"Leader of the Pack"	Carole Beers and Terence Harrison	Jeffrey Scott and Marion Wells	Jill Colbert and David Williams	September 30, 1992	SW31	GT-23
When the Pharaohs, a local high school gang, try to take over the popular fast-food hangout in Spoonerville, Max and P.J. try to stop them with the help of Max's cousin Debbie. Absent: Pete, Peg and Pistol.
21	"Inspector Goofy"	Terence Harrison and Russell E. Mooney	Stephen Sustarsic	Jill Colbert, Phil Weinstein and David Williams	October 1, 1992	SW5	GT-24
Pete gets Goofy a job as a city inspector, but he regrets it when Goofy inspects his business. Note: Max makes a small non-speaking cameo in this episode.
22	"Shake, Rattle & Goof"	Russell E. Mooney and Terence Harrison	Mirith Schilder	Ryan Anthony, Robert Fuentes and Viki Anderson	October 2, 1992	SW38	GT-25
When Goofy helps Max and P.J. start up a rock band, Pete gets an idea and wants to make them famous by being their manager.
23	"Terminal Pete"	Vincente Bassols, Rick Leon and Bob Shellhorn	Bruce Talkington and Stephen Levi	Robert Souza, Curt Walstead and Wendell Washer	October 5, 1992	W42	GT-27
Pete thinks that he is going to die and makes immediate plans. Features a cameo appearance of Gopher.
24	"Fool's Gold"	John Kimball, Rick Leon, Bob Shellhorn and Bob Zamboni	Stephen Levi	Viki Anderson, Kuni Bowen and Vincenzo Trippetti	October 6, 1992	SW45	GT-28
When Chainsaw ends up with gold on her nose Pete wants to find out where it came from with the help of Goofy the track down the source but they end up fighting for who gets the gold.
25	"Cat's Entertainment"	Mitch Rochon and Woody Yocum	Dennis Melonas and Dean Stefan	Ryan Anthony and Robert Fuentes	October 7, 1992	KC59	GT-29
Pete tricks Goofy into giving him his cat Waffles so he can put him in commercials. Absent: P.J.
26	"Waste Makes Haste"	Mitch Rochon and Woody Yocum	Bruce Reid Schaefer	Jill Colbert and David Williams	October 8, 1992	AU23	GT-30
Goofy and Pete start a recycling contest. Soon Pete finds out that a millionaire lost a valuable pair of shoes that are made out of solid gold so he tries to become partners with Goofy.
27	"The Ungoofables"	Vincente Bassols, Mike Svayko and Bob Zamboni	Mirith Schilder	Viki Anderson, Kuni Bowen and Roy Shishido	October 9, 1992	SW25	GT-31
Goofy tells about his G-man ancestor, Elliot Goof. Peg plays a gangster's moll to a villainous Pete! Absent: P.J.
28	"All the Goof That's Fit to Print"	Bob Shellhorn, Mike Svayko and Bob Zamboni	Steve Cuden	Kuni Bowen, Jan Green and John Norton	October 12, 1992	SW3	GT-33
Pete starts his own newspaper to get business for his car dealership, but when a picture of him gets crossed with a picture of an alien he and Goofy have to try and save his image. Absent: Peg and Pistol.
29	"To Heir Is Human"	Terence Harrison	Marion Wells	David Smith, Robert Souza and Vincenzo Trippetti	October 13, 1992	SW56	GT-34
Pete puts P.J. to work at his car lot by pretending to be very ill but truly becomes sick when P.J., with the aid of Goofy and Max, begin putting him in daredevil stunts, not to mention the low-cut sales of his cars.
30	"Hallow-Weenies"	Mike Svayko, James T. Walker and Charles A. Nichols	Cathryn Perdue	Roy Shishido, Robert Souza and Curt Walstead	October 14, 1992	KC54	GT-35
Pete acquires the old Spoonerville Mansion to turn it into his new bed and breakfast, but it is haunted by a trio of ghostly musicians. A Halloween episode which features the ghost of Goofy's great-great-grandfather, Gooferamus T. Goofy.
31	"Tub Be or Not Tub Be"	Mitch Rochon and Woody Yocum	Marion Wells	Sharon Forward, Wendell Washer, Andre Van Morisse and Roy Shishido	October 15, 1992	KC26	GT-36
A bathtub race pits P.J. and Pete together as PJ unwittingly becomes a spy for his father against the Goofs. Absent: Peg and Pistol.
32	"Major Goof"	Terence Harrison	Bruce Talkington and Stephen Levi	Carin-Anne Anderson and Phil Weinstein	October 16, 1992	AU18	GT-37
Pete's jokes are always causing trouble. This time it gets Peg's uncle, General Robert E. Lee Sparrowhawk (aka Uncle Bob), Goofy, Max and P.J. chosen for a secret mission. Absent: Pistol
33	"A Goof of the People"	Terence Harrison	Julia Jane Lewald	David Smith and Vincenzo Trippetti	October 19, 1992	AU61	GT-39
Goofy runs for mayor when pollution becomes a problem in Spoonerville. Pete also runs for mayor but turns to out to be bribe-able.
34	"Goof Under My Roof"	Terence Harrison	Gary Greenfield	Craig Kemplin and Jim McLean	October 20, 1992	GP13	GT-40
Pete seems to own half of Goofy's property, so he uses that fact to lord over Goofy. But it turns out Goofy owns part of Pete's house.
35	"Goodbye Mr. Goofy"	Vincente Bassols, Charles A. Nichols, Richard Trueblood and Bob Zamboni	Jeff Saylor	Kuni Bowen, Curt Walstead, Wendell Washer, Mark Bierbaum and Elizabeth Holzman	October 23, 1992	SW39	GT-41
One of Pete's plans might cost Goofy his beloved home.
36	"Lethal Goofin'"	Mircea Mantta, Mike Svayko, and Bob Zamboni	Mark McCorkle and Robert Schooley	Larry Eikleberry, John Norton, Curt Walstead and Roy Wilson	October 26, 1992	KC33	GT-43
Bullies beware! Max and P.J., new School Safety Patrolmen, are on the prowl. Absent: Goofy, Pete and Peg.
37	"Frankengoof"	Carole Beers and Terence Harrison	Steve Sustarsic	Craig Kemplin and Jim McLean	October 27, 1992	W50	GT-44
Goofy inherits his family's scary Frankengoof castle...and a monster to boot. When Pete tries to be the monster to scare Goofy, he gets more than he bargained for.
38	"E=MC Goof"	Vincente Bassols, Richard Trueblood and Bob Zamboni	Steve Sustarsic and Carl Swenson	Stark Howell, Roy Shishido and Curt Walstead	October 28, 1992	S58	GT-45
Goofy? A rocket scientist? No way, there must be some mix-up somewhere, especially since Goofy's boss is a monkey. Absent: Peg.
39	"Pete's Day at the Races"	Vincente Bassols, Charles A. Nichols and Richard Trueblood	Steve Sustarsic	Viki Anderson, Elizabeth Holzman and Stark Howell	October 29, 1992	AU51	GT-46
Pete tries to win money on what he thinks is a loser of a race horse first by overselling shares in the horse and then by trying with various tricks make the horse lose and the jockey is...Goofy, who finds the cure to make the horse super-fast.
40	"In Goof We Trust"	Mitch Rochon and Mike Svayko	Jan Strnad	Ryan Anthony, Robert Fuentes and Enrique May	October 30, 1992	AU4	GT-47
Goofy's the Most Honest Man in Spoonerville, and Pete -- who has been just exposed as a fraud on the local news -- uses Goof's quality to drum up business at his lot. However Pete soon finds out that his attempt to continue his deceptive business practices contrasts with Goofy's honesty.
41	"And Baby Makes Three"	Mitch Rochon and Bob Treat	Libby Hinson	Don MacKinnon and Nick Pill	November 2, 1992	AU57	GT-49
Fearing that a new arrival to Pete's family will get them iced out, P.J., Pistol and Max give Pete a "baby" (actually P.J. in disguise) he'll never forget.
42	"The Incredible Bulk"	Ron Campbell	Susan Maddocks, Bryan Sullivan and Bruce Talkington	Ron Campbell	November 3, 1992	S20	GT-50
Pete puts Goofy's life at risk when he puts him in a wrestling match with Bulk Brogan, a wrestling champ also known as "Myron a Fry Cook". At the end, Pete wins over Goofy, but gets more than he bargained for.
43	"Mrs. Spoonerville"	Terence Harrison	Steve Cuden	Carin-Anne Anderson and Phil Weinstein	November 4, 1992	W43	GT-51
Pete overhears that Goofy entered a house cleaning contest of Mrs. Spoonerville to win a few items, along with an unclear statement that there is also a prize of $3,000 involved. So, from hearing that, slobbish Pete decides to enter and plays Mr. Clean to all extents in order to win the prize.
44	"For Pete's Sake"	Mike Svayko and Bob Treat	Steve Sustarsic	Larry Eikleberry and Sharon Forward	November 5, 1992	KC34	GT-52
Pete accidentally wrecks his Swiss-army hedge clipper, and decides to deceive Goofy into thinking that he did it instead, knowing that it would cost him a lot to replace. Goofy, discovering it and buying into his scheme as planned, writes him an apology note saying he will get him a replacement. When receiving it, Pete however rips it in half, reading only the first half of it. From reading only that portion out of context, coinciding with being just after Pete has cheated a bunch of customers out of selling them defective used cars and realizing it, he becomes downright paranoid and thinks that someone's out to murder him.
45	"Big City Blues"	Bob Shellhorn and Mike Svayko	Bruce Talkington and Mirith J.S. Colao	Larry Eikleberry, Sharon Forward, Hank Tucker and Curt Walstead	November 6, 1992	SW47	GT-53
Max and P.J. forget all their troubles and cares and go Downtown, where things are not great for their dads who go off searching for them. Absent: Peg and Pistol.
46	"Rally Round the Goof"	Vincente Bassols, Jang-Gil Kim, John Kimball, Richard Trueblood and Bob Zamboni	Steve Cuden	Vicki Anderson, Kuni Bowen and Elizabeth Holzman	November 9, 1992	W49	GT-55
Pete wants Goofy to be his good luck charm in a road race.
47	"Window Pains"	Terence Harrison	Cathryn Perdue	Craig Kemplin and Jim McLean	November 10, 1992	S35	GT-56
Peg's new window washing job causes a battle between her and Pete over who makes the most money. Absent: Max.
48	"Nightmare on Goof Street"	Terence Harrison	Jeff Saylor	David Smith and Vincenzo Trippetti	November 11, 1992	AU63	GT-57
Goofy wins a remodeling contest, but Pete tricks him out of it. Thinking he is going to get free remodeling on his house, Pete soon finds himself conned. Absent: Max, P.J. and Pistol.
49	"Where There's a Will, There's a Goof"	Terence Harrison and Marsh Lamore	Mirith J.S. Colao, Bruce Talkington and Dean Stefan	Floro Dery, Craig Kemplin, Enrique May, Jim McLean, Curt Walstead and Shawna Cha	November 12, 1992	W41	GT-58
Pete and Goofy play brothers to get an inheritance.
50	"Winter Blunderland"	Mitch Rochon and Woody Yocum	Carl Swenson, Terry McDonnell and Jim Carlson	Ryan Anthony and Robert Fuentes	November 13, 1992	J22	GT-59
Pete gets Goofy to play Bigfoot to bring business to his car lot, but it brings along the real Bigfoot instead. Absent: Peg and Pistol.
51	"Gymnauseum"	Carole Beers, Mitch Rochon and Woody Yocum	Mirith J.S. Colao and Mark McCain	Jill Colbert, David Williams and Larry Eikleberry	November 16, 1992	S32	GT-61
Pete starts the exercise kick when he think he's going to lose his beloved Peg.
52	"Come Fly with Me"	Vincente Bassols, Rick Leon and Bob Zamboni	Bruce Reid Schaefer	Kurt Anderson, Elizabeth Holzman and Curt Walstead	November 17, 1992	J40	GT-62
When Pete gets zapped by his computer, he turns into a fly.
53	"As Goof Would Have It"	Bob Shellhorn and Mike Svayko	Stephen Levi	Jill Colbert, Albert Ring and David Williams	November 18, 1992	AU52	GT-63
Pete tricks a diet food company by using a picture of Goofy to display himself. Will he pull it off? Maybe.... not. Absent: Pistol
54	"Calling All Goofs"	Jang Gil Kim and Mircea Mantta	Marion Wells	Sharon Forward and Enrique May	November 19, 1992	W53	GT-64
When Goofy can't afford to go to Tierra del Foongo for his family reunion-because of a dirty trick pulled on him by Pete, Peg decides to avenge Goofy and bring the reunion to him with Pete's credit card. Pete literally wakes up to his worst nightmare with his house full of...Goofs. In response to it, he tries everything in his scheming power to shake them.
55	"Buddy Building"	Carole Beers and Bob Shellhorn	Mirith J.S. Colao and Stephen Levi	Ryan Anthony, Robert Fuentes and Phil Weinstein	November 20, 1992	W19	GT-65
A new kid in town threatens Max and P.J.'s friendship with each other.
56	"Dr. Horatio's Magic Orchestra"	Marsh Lamore and Russell E. Mooney	Steve Sustarsic and Bruce Reid Schaefer	Viki Anderson, Kuni Bowen and Roy Shishido	November 23, 1992	J62	GT-67
Pete buys a mechanical band that plays a song ("When the Saints Go Marching In") he hates!
57	"Goofs of a Feather"	Terence Harrison and Mircea Mantta	Jeff Saylor	Carin-Anne Anderson, Jim McLean and Phil Weinstein	November 24, 1992	AU48	GT-68
When Pete kills a duck while hunting, the duck family takes up residence in his house. Absent: Max.
58	"Goof Fellas"	Vincente Bassols and Bob Zamboni	Steve Cuden and Jeff Saylor	Jan Green, Lonnie Lloyd and Robert Souza	November 25, 1992	J64	GT-69
When Goofy and Pete are witnesses to an attempted murder, they are placed in the Witness Protection, but Goofy does not seem to comply with the rules. Absent: Max, P.J. and Pistol.
59	"The Good, the Bad and the Goofy"	Vincente Bassols, Mike Svayko, Bob Zamboni and Brian Ray	Jeff Saylor	Gaetan Brizzi and Paul Brizzi	November 26, 1992	FR17	GT-70
The police think that Pete is a hard-to-catch burglar, thanks to Goofy. But they get the real burglars at the end. Absent: Max, P.J. and Pistol.
60	"Educating Goofy"	Terence Harrison	Steve Sustarsic	Jim McLean, Chris Rutkowski and David Smith	November 27, 1992	KC60	GT-71
Goofy's going back to school to finish what he began, but Max, before, is ashamed for him.
61	"Peg o' the Jungle"	Terence Harrison	Marion Wells	Carin-Anne Anderson, George Goode and Phil Weinstein	November 30, 1992	GP65	GT-73
Goofy teaches Pete to be a man with sensitivity after he forgets his and Peg's anniversary....again.
62	"Partners in Grime"	Terence Harrison and Mircea Mantta	Mike Ryan and Carl Swenson	Floro Dery, George Goode, Craig Kemplin and David Smith	December 1, 1992	AU55	GT-74
Pete and Goofy are partners in a catering business.
63	"A Pizza the Action"	Terence Harrison, Mircea Mantta, Mitch Rochon and Woody Yocum	Stephen Levi	Jill Colbert, Llyn Hunter, Albert Ring and David Williams	December 2, 1992	J6	GT-75
When Pete gets stuck with a failing pizza franchise, Goofy is the only person that Pete thinks can get it off his hands. With the help of Max, Goofy tries to bring the franchise back.
64	"To Catch a Goof"	Vincente Bassols, Richard Trueblood and Bob Zamboni	Jan Strnad	Jan Green, Stark Howell, Lonnie Lloyd and Robert Souza	December 3, 1992	FR24	GT-76
Pete goes on a diet, Goofy works on his ninja training techniques, and a burglar is roaming around town. The police catch the burglar at the end.
65	"Gunfight at the Okie-Doke Corral"	Mircea Mantta, Mike Svayko, Bob Zamboni, Marsh Lamore, Brian Ray, Mitch Rochon, Bob Shellhorn and Woody Yocum	Dean Stefan	Larry Eikleberry, Jan Green, John Norton and Denise Koyama	December 4, 1992	FR36	GT-77
When Max doesn't want to wear his glasses Goofy tells him the story of ancestor Mopalong Goofy who wore glasses. Absent: P.J. and Pistol.

=== ABC (1992) ===
No. overall	No. in season	Title	Directed by	Written by	Storyboard by	Original release date	Prod. code	Packaging code
66	1	"Queasy Rider"	Mitch Rochon, Mike Svayko and Mircea Mantta	Mark McCorkle and Robert Schooley	Viki Anderson, Roy Wilson and Tom Nelson	September 12, 1992	KC69	GT-07
Max's exciting ride on Goofy's old motorcycle takes a turn for the worse when he encounters some mean biker dudes. Absent: Peg and Pistol.
67	2	"Maximum Insecurity"	Mircea Mantta, Mike Svayko and Bob Zamboni	Julia Jane Lewald	Viki Anderson, Craig Kemplin, Denise Koyama and Robert Fuentes	September 19, 1992	AU67	GT-14
If Max and P.J. do not clear themselves of being framed for stealing, they will be sent up the creek.
68	3	"Puppy Love"	Mitch Rochon	Jymn Magon and Alan Katz	Jan Green and Curt Walstaed	September 26, 1992	KC70	GT-20
P.J. wants to impress a girl at school and ask her to the Spring Fling, with the help of Pete, Peg and Max. Absent: Goofy.
69	4	"Great Egg-Spectations"	Mitch Rochon and Mike Svayko	Cathryn Perdue and Jymn Magon	Holly Forsyth and John Norton	October 3, 1992	AU66	GT-26
Max finds an egg and it hatches into a baby dinosaur. Absent: Peg.
70	5	"Three Ring Bind"	Mitch Rochon and Mike Svayko	Bruce Talkington and Libby Hinson	Rhoy Shishido and Wendell Washer	May 4, 1992 (Disney Channel preview); October 10, 1992 (ABC Saturday Morning)	AU68	GT-32
Pistol plays born free with a bad circus's animals, but Pete is worried about her.
71	6	"Pistolgeist"	Vincente Bassols and Bob Zamboni	Libby Hinson	Viki Anderson, Curt Walstead, Wendell Washer and Stark Howell	October 17, 1992	W76	GT-38
P.J. and Max build Pistol a cardboard spaceship based on Pistol's favorite book with unexpected results.
72	7	"Bringin' on the Rain"	Mitch Rochon and Woody Yocum	George Shea	Ryan Anthony and Robert Fuentes	October 24, 1992	S77	GT-42
A drought hits, and Pete does anything to get water to his garden, even if he has to steal it from Goofy, which gets Goofy in trouble and jailed, but in the end, Pete goes to jail and has the same roommate Goofy has when he was in jail. (Gopher from Winnie the Pooh makes a second cameo appearance) Absent: Pistol.
73	8	"Talent to the Max"	Vincente Bassols and Terence Harrison	Bob Kushell and Steve Smith	Ryan Anthony, Robert Fuentes and Curt Walstead	October 31, 1992	KC73	GT-48
P.J. cannot tell Max that his magic act is not real.
74	9	"Tee for Two"	Mitch Rochon and Woody Yocum	Marion Wells	Larry Eikleberry and Sharon Forward	November 7, 1992	W78	GT-54
It's Peg vs. Pete when she wants to save a miniature golf course he wants to tear down.
75	10	"Goofin' Up the Social Ladder"	Bob Shellhorn and Bob Treat	Mirith J.S. Colao	Hank Tucker and David Williams	November 14, 1992	S71	GT-60
Peg tries to unload some high-class real estate, and the gang helps her out.
76	11	"Sherlock Goof"	Vincente Bassols, Charles A. Nichols and Bob Zamboni	Stephen Levi	Jan Green, John Norton and Viki Anderson	November 21, 1992	KC72	GT-66
Let's go off to jolly old England with another one of Goofy's ancestors, a detective named Sherlock Goof. Absent: Peg and P.J.
77	12	"From Air to Eternity"	Mike Svayko and Bob Treat	Jan Strnad	Jill Colbert and David Williams	November 28, 1992	SW75	GT-72
P.J. is afraid of heights, and he's afraid to tell his dad. Absent: Peg.
78	13	"Clan of the Cave Goof"	Vincente Bassols, Richard Trueblood and Bob Zamboni	Carl Swenson	Jan Green and John Norton	December 5, 1992	KC74	GT-78
Goofy tells Max about his cavemen ancestor, Caveman Goof, how important regular dental checkups are. Absent: P.J.

== Special ==
Title	Directed by	Written by	Storyboarded by	Original release date	Prod. code
"Goof Troop Christmas: Have Yourself a Goofy Little Christmas"	Mircea Mantta, Bob Zamboni, Charles A. Nichols, Mitch Rochon, Richard Trueblood and Woody Yocum	Jymn Magon	Jan Green, John Norton and Wendell Washer	November 26, 1992	FR01
Pete is tired of Goofy shorting out his electricity and blowing up his Christmas decorations every year, so takes the family and leaves for Asperin, Colorado. But Max, not wanting to be alone with Goofy, convinces him to join the Petes at their snowy retreat. Note: The Goof Troop Christmas special was originally syndicated as a stand-alone special during November–December 1992; the airdate varied from market to market.

== Films ==
No.	Title	Directed by	Written by	Storyboarded by	Original release date
1	"A Goofy Movie"	Kevin Lima	Story by : Jymn Magon; Teleplay by : Jymm Magon, Brian Pimental and Chris Matheson	Chris Ure, Steve Moore, John Norton, Viki Anderson, Andy Gaskill, Carole Holliday, Jim Kammerud, Enrique May, Darrell Rooney, Hank Tucker and Frans Vischer	April 7, 1995
2	"An Extremely Goofy Movie"	Douglas McCarthy	Scott Gorden	Holly Forsyth, Larry Leker, Terry Lennon, Jennifer Lerew, Bob Logan, Linda Miller, Larry Scholl, Robert Souza, David Smith and Alan Zegler	VHS/DVD: February 29, 2000
