= Buzz Lightyear of Star Command: The Adventure Begins =

2000 American animated film by Tad Stones

- Home video release poster
- Directed by: Tad Stones
- Screenplay by: Mark McCorkle; Bob Schooley; Bill Motz; Bob Roth
- Based on: Toy Story by John Lasseter; Pete Docter; Andrew Stanton; Joe Ranft
- Produced by: Mark McCorkle; Bob Schooley; Tad Stones
- Starring: Tim Allen; Nicole Sullivan; Larry Miller; Stephen Furst; Wayne Knight; Adam Carolla; Patrick Warburton; Diedrich Bader
- Edited by: John Royer
- Music by: Adam Berry
- Production companies: Walt Disney Television Animation; Pixar Animation Studios
- Distributed by: Buena Vista Home Entertainment (Note: Released through the Walt Disney Pictures banner)
- Release date: August 8, 2000
- Running time: 70 minutes
- Country: United States
- Language: English

Buzz Lightyear of Star Command: The Adventure Begins is a 2000 American animated science fiction comedy film directed by Tad Stones, who is also the producer with Mark McCorkle and Bob Schooley. It is a spin-off of Pixar's Toy Story franchise and was released direct-to-video in the United States by Buena Vista Home Entertainment on August 8, 2000.

The film acts as a pilot for the television series Buzz Lightyear of Star Command (2000–2001), and compiles three episodes of the show into a single narrative. Buzz Lightyear of Star Command: The Adventure Begins was nominated for two Video Premiere Awards: Best Animated Video Premiere and Best Animated Character Performance for Tim Allen.

== Plot ==
Buzz Lightyear and his partner Warp Darkmatter search for three missing Little Green Men (L.G.M.), a noosphere-dwelling race working as scientists for Star Command's Universe Protection Unit. They discover the lost L.G.M. in a hidden lab belonging to Buzz's archnemesis, the evil Emperor Zurg. Buzz and Warp break in and rescue the L.G.M. However, Zurg escapes and triggers the self-destruct mechanism; Warp gets pinned under debris and forces Buzz to leave just before the explosion happens, seemingly killing Warp. Stricken with survivor guilt over Warp's death, Buzz refuses to have another partner.

Later, Commander Nebula introduces Buzz to Mira Nova, a prodigy ranger and the princess of the planet Tangea, which Buzz saved from Zurg a while back. With the power of "ghosting", Mira is able to phase through objects. Nebula makes Mira Buzz's new partner, but Buzz refuses. Afterwards, Buzz prevents a well-meaning janitor named Booster—who dreams of becoming a space ranger—from being fired. Meanwhile, in Zurg's fortress, a new robotic henchman named Agent Z is hired. Zurg learns of a large orb on the L.G.M. home world called the Uni-Mind, responsible for the telepathic link between them; he sends Agent Z to capture it. The L.G.M. on Star Command build a new robot soldier called XR, capable of being repaired after any damage. The L.G.M. offer XR as Buzz's new partner, but Buzz is hesitant. The L.G.M. then get a telepathic message about Zurg's attack on their homeworld. When Buzz and XR arrive on the L.G.M. planet, Agent Z confronts them and destroys XR while Zurg steals the Uni-Mind. Unable to think clearly, the L.G.M. rebuild XR, accidentally making him self-aware. Commander Nebula decides to launch a full-scale assault on Planet Z, despite Mira's argument that a solo ranger could go to stop Zurg with the Alpha-One prototype spacecraft.

Zurg corrupts the Uni-Mind and installs it into the "Mega-Ray" to bend the galaxy to Zurg's will. Mira steals the Alpha-One to fight Zurg. Buzz, who wanted to use her plan by himself, pursues Mira in his own craft, unaware Booster and XR have stowed away on his ship. Eventually, Buzz catches Mira and stores Alpha-One in his spaceship's cargo bay; Booster and XR are then discovered. Zurg's Mega-Ray subverts several planets in quick succession before turning it on Star Command. Buzz, Mira, Booster, and XR discover all of Star Command has been suborned by Zurg; they flee in Buzz's Star Cruiser. Zurg uses Star Command's entire arsenal, planting a bomb on Buzz's ship. Buzz and the others escape in the Alpha-One just before the bomb detonates, destroying the cruiser. Zurg presumes Buzz is dead.

Booster accidentally causes the ship to crash-land on Planet Z. There, Buzz, insistent on finishing the mission alone, orders the others to leave. Buzz fights Agent Z, but is incapacitated and delivered to Zurg. Agent Z reveals himself to be Warp; in addition to having faked his death, he had secretly been working for Zurg for years as a double agent. Buzz dictates his "final log entry", a coded distress call to Mira, Booster and XR.

Zurg plans to use the Mega-Ray on Buzz, but XR and Booster intervene in time to rescue him as it fires. Booster and Mira destroy Warp's mechanical arm after Booster lands on him. Buzz fights Zurg, who escapes before Buzz's allies can arrest him. Booster and XR arrest Warp. Mira uses her "ghosting" power to push Buzz to the core of the Uni-Mind and restore it to normal, freeing the suborned peoples and leaving Zurg momentarily helpless and dismayed. The unity of the L.G.M. is restored and Warp is taken to prison for treason. Buzz, having admitted that he cannot work alone, creates a new team called "Team Lightyear" with XR, Mira and Booster.

== Voice cast ==
- Tim Allen as Buzz Lightyear
- Wayne Knight as Evil Emperor Zurg
- Stephen Furst as Booster
- Nicole Sullivan as Mira Nova
- Larry Miller as XR
- Adam Carolla as Commander Nebula
- Patrick Warburton as LGM
- Diedrich Bader as Warp Darkmatter/Agent Z
- Kevin Michael Richardson as Space Ranger
- Charles Kimbrough as Brain Pod #29
- Cindy Warden as Technician and Computer Voice
- Frank Welker as Grubs, Self Destruct, Ranger #1, Rhizomian Man, and Cadet Flarn
- Sean Hayes as Brain Pod #13
- Jennifer Bailey as Rhizomian Woman
- Jim Hanks as Woody
- Wallace Shawn as Rex
- Jeff Pidgeon as toy aliens
- R. Lee Ermey as Sarge
- Andrew Stanton as Hamm
- Joe Ranft as Wheezy

== Production ==
The beginning of the film includes a computer-animated Toy Story sequence set in Andy's bedroom which was directed at Pixar Animation Studios by Angus MacLane, while the main film is traditionally animated by Walt Disney Television Animation like the series. The introductory sequence features Tim Allen, Wallace Shawn, R. Lee Ermey, Joe Ranft, and Jeff Pidgeon rerprising their respective roles as Buzz Lightyear, Rex, Sarge, Wheezy, and the toy aliens. Woody is voiced by Jim Hanks, the brother of his original actor Tom Hanks, and Hamm is voiced by Andrew Stanton replacing his original actor John Ratzenberger.

Patrick Warburton, the voice of Buzz in the Buzz Lightyear of Star Command series, recorded his lines for the film first before Allen was brought in redub the character at the request of Disney executives. During recording sessions, Allen had to sync his lines to Buzz's mouth movements which were animated to Warburton's performance. Warburton's vocals were retained for the film's airing as individual episodes on Disney Channel.

== Release ==
Buzz Lightyear of Star Command: The Adventure Begins was released to VHS and DVD on August 8, 2000. Upon release, the film became the top video release shipping 4 million units across VHS and DVD.

== Reception ==
Bruce Fretts of Entertainment Weekly rated the film D+ and called it "a straight-to-tape travesty". Susan King of the Los Angeles Times described the animation as "a cut above the norm" for direct-to-video films, and she said the script is "breezy and funny".

== Awards and nominations ==
Year	Award	Title	Recipient	Result	Ref.
2001	Video Premiere Award	Best Animated Character Performance	Tim Allen (voice), Greg Guler (key character designer: Buzz Lightyear)	Nominated	
2001	Video Premiere Award	Best Animated Video Premiere	Mike Karafilis (producer), (Note: Credited as associate producer) Mark McCorkle (producer), Bob Schooley (producer), Tad Stones (producer)	Nominated	

== See also ==
- Lightyear – 2022 Pixar film
