= Sky High (2005 film) =

2005 film by Mike Mitchell

- Theatrical release poster
- Directed by: Mike Mitchell
- Written by: Paul Hernandez; Bob Schooley; Mark McCorkle
- Produced by: Andrew Gunn
- Starring: Kelly Preston; Michael Angarano; Danielle Panabaker; Mary Elizabeth Winstead; Kurt Russell
- Cinematography: Shelly Johnson
- Edited by: Peter Amundson
- Music by: Michael Giacchino
- Production companies: Walt Disney Pictures; Gunn Films
- Distributed by: Buena Vista Pictures Distribution
- Release date: July 29, 2005
- Running time: 100 minutes
- Country: United States
- Language: English
- Budget: $35 million
- Box office: $86.4 million

Sky High is a 2005 American superhero comedy film directed by Mike Mitchell and written by Paul Hernandez, and Kim Possible creators Bob Schooley and Mark McCorkle. Produced by Walt Disney Pictures, the film stars Kelly Preston, Michael Angarano, Danielle Panabaker, Mary Elizabeth Winstead and Kurt Russell. It follows Will Stronghold (Angarano), the son of two superheroes, who is enrolled in an airborne high school for teenage superheroes. As his dormant superpowers manifest, he struggles to maintain his relationships with his old friends, learns of a threat from a mysterious supervillain, and searches for the girl of his dreams.

The film was theatrically released by Buena Vista Pictures Distribution on July 29, 2005, and grossed $86.4 million worldwide against a production budget of $35 million. The film received generally positive reviews from critics and audiences during its original theatrical run and has since been recognized as a cult film.

== Plot ==
Will Stronghold lives with his superhero parents, Steve Stronghold / The Commander and Josie DeMarco-Stronghold / Jetstream, in Maxville. Will is anxious about attending his parents' alma mater Sky High, a school located on a secret floating campus, because he has not developed any superpowers yet.

On their first day, Will, his best friend Layla Williams, and the other freshmen are harassed by seniors Speed, Lash, and Penny. Will falls for Gwen Grayson, a popular senior and technopath. Will is assigned to the "Hero Support" curriculum and becomes a sidekick due to his lack of powers, prompting Layla to join him in protest of the school's two-track education system.

Unaware of what happened to his son, Steve shows Will his hidden trophy room, the Secret Sanctum. He expresses particular fondness for the "Pacifier", a weapon he took from his presumed dead arch-nemesis Royal Pain 16 years earlier, failing to notice a hidden camera in a new trophy.

Will comes into conflict with pyrokinetic student and outcast Warren Peace, whose supervillain father was imprisoned by Steve. In the ensuing fight, Will suddenly develops super-strength. He is transferred to the Hero curriculum and begins to spend more time with Gwen and her friends, ignoring Layla and the sidekicks. Layla later confides to Warren that she is in love with Will while Gwen invites his parents as honored guests to the Homecoming dance and they spend the evening together.

On the day before the dance, Gwen tricks Will into throwing a party at his house and has Speed steal the Pacifier. Layla tries to investigate but is stopped by Gwen, who claims Will knows about her feelings for him and is too polite to reject her. As Layla leaves in tears, Will breaks up with Gwen and refuses to attend the dance. Layla ignores Will's attempts to reconcile while Warren reveals her obvious feelings for him to Will. Will goes through his father's yearbook and sees a student resembling Gwen named Sue Tenny, who disappeared before his parents' graduation. Realizing that the Pacifier is missing, Will assumes Tenny became Royal Pain and Gwen is her daughter, and heads to Sky High to stop her with help from a powerless bus driver named Ron Wilson.

At the dance, Gwen reveals she is Royal Pain, explaining that she was Tenny and had been de-aged by the Pacifier during her last fight with Steve. With Speed, Lash, and Penny's aid, Gwen uses the Pacifier to turn the students, staff, and Will's parents into babies, intending to kidnap and raise them to become supervillains. After reconciling with Layla, Will teams up with her, Warren, Ron, and the other sidekicks to rescue the captives and defeat Gwen's allies. In the ensuing fight, Gwen blasts Will off the edge of the school, but Will develops flight power and defeats her. Gwen sabotages the school's anti-gravity drive, but the sidekicks successfully restart it, and Will uses both of his powers to lift the school back in place.

With Sky High saved, Gwen and her allies are imprisoned while her captives are restored to their proper ages, and the Pacifier is destroyed. Ron falls into a vat of toxic waste and becomes a superhero. Will befriends Warren and enters a relationship with Layla.

== Cast ==
- Michael Angarano as William Theodore "Will" Stronghold, a freshman at Sky High and the son of famous superheroes and Maxville real estate agents, the Commander and Jetstream, who inherited his father's super-strength and his mother's ability to fly, though they are initially dormant and gradually manifest over the course of the film. Will also serves as the narrator of the film.
- Kurt Russell as Steven "Steve" Stronghold / The Commander, Will's father who is reputed as one of the world's strongest superheroes, possessing superhuman strength and invulnerability, and a successful businessman in his secret identity.
  - Zachry Rogers as a younger Commander
- Kelly Preston as Josie DeMarco-Stronghold / Jetstream, Will's mother and a successful real estate agent who can fly at supersonic speeds and is an expert hand-to-hand combatant.
- Danielle Panabaker as Layla Williams, Will's botanokinetic, pacifistic, childhood best friend, next-door neighbor, and later girlfriend.
- Christopher Wynne as a news anchor
- Kevin Heffernan as Ronald "Ron" Wilson, Sky High's kind-hearted bus driver and the son of two superheroes. Initially powerless, he gains the ability to grow to a giant size after falling into a vat of toxic waste.
- Dee Jay Daniels as Ethan Bank / Popsicle, a sidekick and one of Will's friends who can melt into a liquid.
- Kelly Vitz as Magenta "Maj" Lewis, a sidekick and one of Will's friends who can morph into a guinea pig with purple highlights and streaks in her fur similar to those in her human hair.
- Loren Berman as Larry, a socially awkward student who can turn into a giant, muscular humanoid rock-skinned monster at will.
- Nicholas Braun as Zachary "Zach" Braun / Zack Attack, a sidekick and Will's childhood friend who can glow in the dark.
- Malika Haqq and Khadijah Haqq as Penny Lent, an athletic senior at Sky High who can duplicate herself.
- Jake Sandvig as Lash, a skinny bully and senior at Sky High who has complete body elasticity.
- Will Harris as Speed, an overweight bully and senior at Sky High who can move at superhuman speeds.
- Mary Elizabeth Winstead as Gwendolyn "Gwen" Grayson / Royal Pain / Susan "Sue" Tenny, a technopathic senior at Sky High and Penny's best friend on whom Will has a crush. Winstead said of her role, "I bounced around. I was either the hero of the sidekicks or the sidekick to the heroes." Years prior, she was a Sky High student named Sue Tenny, who was assigned to the sidekick curriculum as no one understood her powers, eventually putting her on the path to becoming a supervillain and the Commander's arch-nemesis until an accident with her "Pacifier" de-aged her during one of their battles.
  - Patrick Warburton provides the voice of Royal Pain when Gwen is in her full Royal Pain outfit.
- Lynda Carter as Principal Powers, the principal of Sky High who can transform into a comet-like form.
- Bruce Campbell as Tommy Boomowski / Coach Boomer / Sonic Boom, Sky High's gym teacher who can release sonic waves from his vocal cords who is also responsible for sorting out the new students.
- Dustin Ingram as Carbon Copy Kid, a student with shapeshifting powers.
- Kevin McDonald as Professor Medulla, Sky High's Mad Science teacher who possesses an oversized brain, which grants advanced intelligence, creativity, and a multitude of genius-level skills.
- Steven Strait as Warren Peace, the pyrokinetic son of supervillain Baron Battle, who is in jail with four life sentences because of the Commander, and an unnamed superhero mother.
- Cloris Leachman as Nurse Spex, Sky High's elderly and eccentric yet kind school nurse with x-ray vision who examines Will and explains how superpower manifestation works.
- Jim Rash as Mr. Grayson / Stitches, Royal Pain's cackling sidekick who raised her as his daughter after she was turned into a baby by the Pacifier.
- Dave Foley as Mr. Jonathan Boy / All-American Boy, the Commander's former sidekick who works as a Hero Support teacher at Sky High.
- Amy and Kimmy Brown as a good twin and a bad twin that Professor Medulla dates after Coach Boomer tries to set Professor Medulla up with the good twin.
- Lucille Soong as a cook
- Nicole Malgarini as Freeze Girl (uncredited), a student with cryokinetic powers.
- Kim Rhodes as Elastic Girl / Professor Jeannie Elast (deleted scene), a superhero with elasticity.

Additionally, Tom Kenny and Jill Talley make cameo appearances as Mr. and Mrs. Chester Timmerman, a couple who witness Will prevent Sky High from destroying their new home.

== Production ==
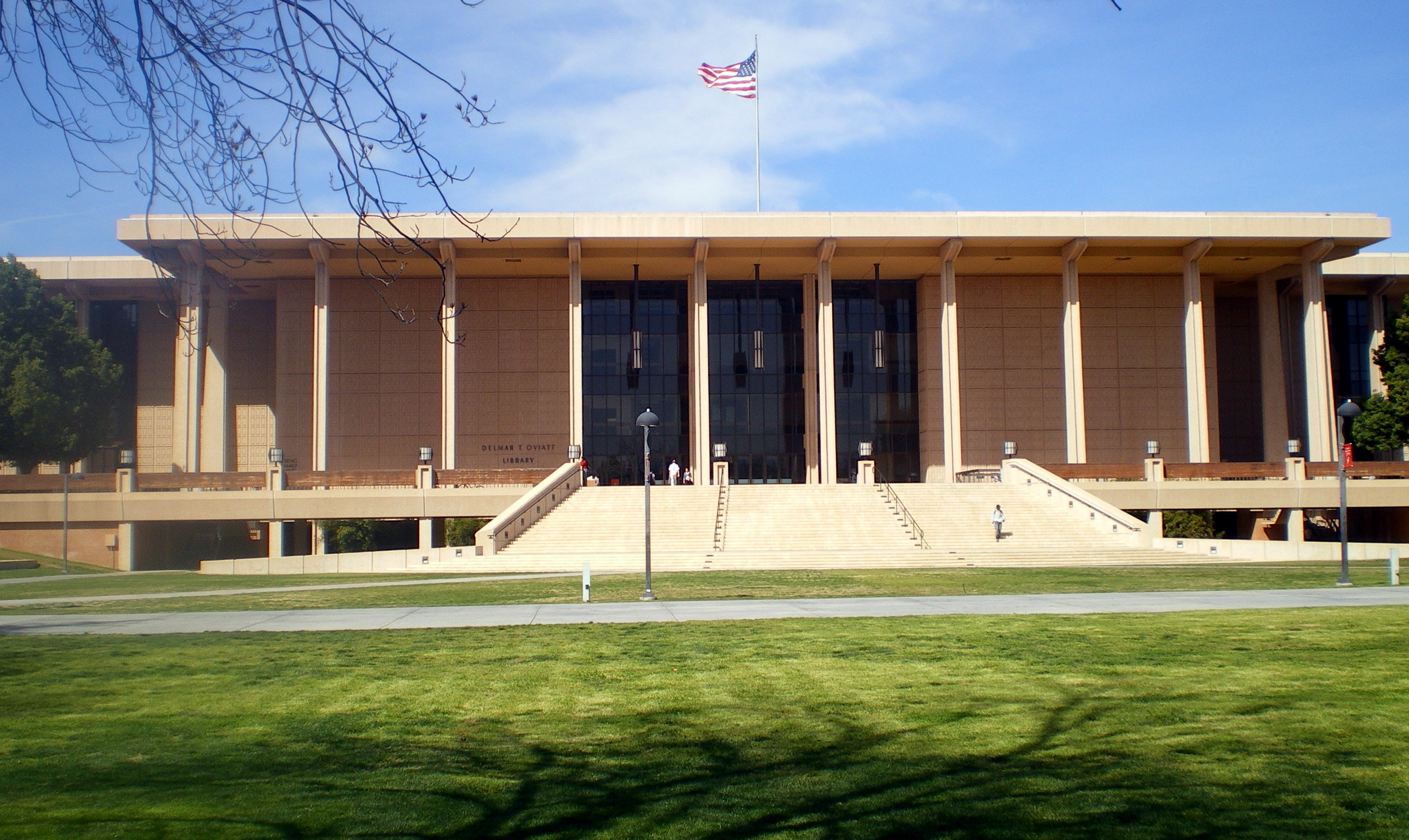
Oviatt Library at CSU Northridge

Exterior shots of the Sky High school were filmed at the Oviatt Library at California State University in Northridge in late 2004.

In between working on the first and second seasons of the animated series Kim Possible, creators Bob Schooley and Mark McCorkle had begun writing a script for a live-action adaptation, which ultimately never came to fruition. Impressed with their work, the filmmakers asked them to look into re-writing the script for Sky High, which had been previously shelved. McCorkle believes they were recruited for Sky High because "they liked the idea of a superhero high school. I think, reading how we wrote teens in Kim Possible, they felt like, 'This feels good and contemporary, and maybe you can apply that to this project for us.' Similar to Kim Possible, Schooley and McCorkle wrote Sky High to be equally appealing to both children and adults. According to scifi.com, Disney was attracted by the "original concept" of "children of superheroes going to high school", originally conceived by screenwriter Paul Hernandez in the 1990s.

After recruiting Schooley and McCorkle to update Hernandez's script (they only wrote the beginning and ending sequences) Disney hired several comedians such as Kevin McDonald, Dave Foley, and Kevin Heffernan for supporting roles. For the main roles, the casting was a mix of established and new teenage actors: while Michael Angarano and Mary Elizabeth Winstead were already successful, Danielle Panabaker was little-known and former model Steven Strait was hired after his first audition ever.

Director Mike Mitchell said that Sky High functions on two premises: "the adults are all insane" and "the girls are smarter than the boys": the adults portrayed in the film tend to be caricatured, while the teenage girls are written as more assertive and powerful than the boys. The film also employed extensive usage of Dutch angles. For the treatment of the teenage actors, Mitchell also stated that the actors all had their own trailers and were generally kept separated, because "we did not want them to date after the second week and break up after the fourth", which would have made filming difficult.

Mitchell, a science fiction fan, stated that the project "was a dream", because it brought him together with four of his favorite science fiction heroes: Wonder Woman actress Lynda Carter, Snake Plissken actor Kurt Russell, Ash Williams actor Bruce Campbell, and Cloris Leachman, who earned fame as Frau Blücher in Young Frankenstein.

== Music ==
Sky High (Original Soundtrack)

Soundtrack album by Various artists
- Released: July 26, 2005
- Genre: Soundtrack
- Length: 46:28
- Label: Hollywood Records

Singles from Sky High (Original Soundtrack)
- 1. "I Melt with You" Released: 2005

Professional ratings
Review scores
| Source | Rating |
|---|---|
| AllMusic | 2.5/5 stars |

The soundtrack album for the film was released by Hollywood Records on July 26, 2005, and is composed of covers of new wave songs mostly from the 1980s ("Just What I Needed" is from 1978). While none of the film's score composed by Michael Giacchino was included on the album, a limited edition of his score was released by Intrada Records in 2017.

Track listing

1. "I Melt with You" – Bowling for Soup (originally by Modern English) - 4:03
2. "Through Being Cool" – They Might Be Giants (originally by Devo) - 3:17
3. "Save It for Later" – Flashlight Brown (originally by the Beat) - 2:49
4. "Everybody Wants to Rule the World" – Christian Burns (originally by Tears for Fears) - 4:28
5. "One Thing Leads to Another" – Steven Strait (originally by the Fixx) - 3:10
6. "Lies" – The Click Five (originally by Thompson Twins) - 2:58
7. "Voices Carry" – Vitamin C (originally by 'Til Tuesday) - 4:16
8. "Please, Please, Please, Let Me Get What I Want" – Elefant (originally by the Smiths) - 2:53
9. "True" – Cary Brothers (originally by Spandau Ballet) - 5:11
10. "Just What I Needed" – Caleigh Peters (originally by the Cars) - 3:38
11. "Can't Stop the World" – Ginger Sling (originally by the Go-Go's) - 3:25
12. "And She Was" – Keaton Simons (originally by Talking Heads) - 3:49
13. "Twist and Crawl" – Skindred (originally by the Beat) - 2:31

=== Reception ===
AllMusic rated the album 2.5/5, saying that it "stumbles more than it succeeds" and is "painfully conventional."

== Reception ==
=== Box office ===
On an estimated budget of US$35 million, the film grossed just under $64 million in the US, and another $22 million internationally, bringing the total to $86 million.

=== Critical response ===
Sky High received positive reviews upon release. On Rotten Tomatoes, the film has an approval rating of 74% based on reviews from 129 critics, with an average rating of 6.5/10. The site's critical consensus states: "This highly derivative superhero coming-of-age flick is moderately entertaining, family-friendly fluff." On Metacritic the film has a weighted average score of 62 based on reviews from 29 critics, indicating "generally favorable reviews". Audiences surveyed by CinemaScore gave the film a grade A− on a scale of A+ to F.

Joe Leydon of Variety magazine praised the film calling it: "Smartly written and sprightly played, Sky High satisfies with a clever commingling of spoofy superheroics, school-daze hijinks" and "this lively live-action Disney release stands on its own merits as a tongue-in-cheek fantasy with cross-generational appeal." Neil Smith at BBC.com wrote: "While originality is hardly the film's strongest suit, its agreeable mix of knowing spoof and kid-pleasing fantasy makes it considerably more engaging than some of the 'straight' superhero blockbusters we've suffered recently."

Since its initial release, Sky High has been received more favorably in retrospective reviews and has developed a cult following, particularly due to its lighthearted homage to superhero tropes. Mark Harrison, writing for Den of Geek, summarized, "With a cast made up of bright young things and cult favourites and a script that goes post-modern without ever getting arch or snarky, Sky High is a real gem from Disney’s live action catalog. It borrows from JK Rowling, John Hughes, Joss Whedon, and any number of comic books and yet still stands on its own. Next to the current superhero boom, it was so ahead of its time that a decade later, it seems sharper and funnier than ever".

== Home media ==
The film was released on DVD on November 29, 2005, and Blu-ray on November 21, 2006. The film also had a limited VHS release exclusively through the Disney Movie Club, prior to the last VHS releases of Disney films in 2007. It is also included on Disney's streaming service, Disney+.

== Cancelled sequel and TV series ==
In November 2016, Disney announced a sequel to Sky High was in early development. In January 2019, Sky High director Mike Mitchell revealed earlier plans to make a franchise, but due to the film's box-office performance, nothing came to be. The sequel would have been titled Save U and featured the characters from Sky High graduating from high school and attending the eponymous Save University. There were also plans to make a TV series, which the main actors (save for Kurt Russell and Kelly Preston) had signed on to reprise their roles for. In March 2024, Mitchell still expressed interest in a sequel but felt that since Disney's acquisition of Marvel Entertainment, it has prioritised Marvel as its superhero output. He also stated that he would like to do a Sky High-inspired project set in the Marvel Cinematic Universe.

== See also ==
- Hero High
- PS238
- Zoom
- My Hero Academia
- Up, Up and Away
