= Adam Berry =

American composer (born 1966)

Adam Barrett Berry (born December 3, 1966) is a two-time American Emmy Award-winning television and film composer and a Grammy Award-winning producer and member of the new age band White Sun. He is originally from Los Angeles. Some of his credits include South Park, Kim Possible, American Dragon: Jake Long, Buzz Lightyear of Star Command, Penguins of Madagascar, Big Hero 6: The Series, and The Sarah Silverman Program. He worked closely with Trey Parker and Matt Stone's in developing the scores for the first four seasons of South Park, and also played in their punk band, DVDA. As a member of White Sun, Berry garnered a Grammy Award for best New Age album in 2017 for the album White Sun II.

== Filmography ==
=== Film ===
Year	Film
1996	Fugitive Rage
1996	Friend of the Family II
1999	Star Portal
1999	American Intellectuals
2000	Buzz Lightyear of Star Command: The Adventure Begins
2002	Balto II: Wolf Quest
2003	Tara
2003	Beethoven's 5th
2004	Balto III: Wings of Change
2005	Paine Management
2005	The Trouble with Dee Dee
2008	Happy Campers
2010	Boobs: An American Obsession

=== Television ===
Year	Series	Notes
1997–2000	South Park	
1998–1999	Hercules	
2000–2001	Buzz Lightyear of Star Command	
2001–2003	Small Shots	
2002–2007	Kim Possible	Emmy nominated: Outstanding Music Direction and Composition, 2005
2005–2006	The Buzz on Maggie	
2006–2007	American Dragon: Jake Long	Season 2
2007–2010	The Sarah Silverman Program	
2008–2015	The Penguins of Madagascar	Emmy wins: Outstanding Music Direction and Composition, 2011; Outstanding Original Song—Children's and Animation, 2012
2013–2014	Monsters vs. Aliens	
2016–2018	Lost in Oz	
2017–2021	Big Hero 6: The Series	
2019–2021	Scooby-Doo and Guess Who?	
