= Buzz Lightyear of Star Command =

American animated television series (2000–2001)

- Genre: Science fiction comedy
- Created by: Mark McCorkle; Bob Schooley
- Based on: Toy Story by Pixar
- Voices of: Patrick Warburton; Stephen Furst; Larry Miller; Neil Flynn; Nicole Sullivan; Wayne Knight; Frank Welker; Adam Carolla
- Theme music composer: Adam Berry
- Composer: Adam Berry
- Country of origin: United States
- Original language: English
- No. of seasons: 1
- No. of episodes: 62 (Note: 65 episodes, when counted with the pilot film being split into three parts)

Production
- Executive producers: Mark McCorkle; Bob Schooley; Tad Stones
- Running time: 22–24 minutes
- Production companies: Walt Disney Television Animation; Pixar Animation Studios

Original release
- Network: ABC; UPN
- Release: October 2, 2000 – January 13, 2001

Related
- Buzz Lightyear of Star Command: The Adventure Begins

Buzz Lightyear of Star Command is an American animated science fiction comedy television series produced by Walt Disney Television Animation. It is a spin-off of Pixar's Toy Story franchise, and aired on ABC and UPN from October 2, 2000, to January 13, 2001. While the series is 2D animated, Pixar animated the CGI opening title sequence.

Developed by Bob Schooley and Mark McCorkle, the series follows the adventures of Space Ranger Buzz Lightyear. The character first appeared as an action figure, voiced by Tim Allen, in the 1995 film Toy Story. Patrick Warburton voices the character in the television series. The series was preceded by the direct-to-video film Buzz Lightyear of Star Command: The Adventure Begins, which later aired as three separate episodes of the series. A video game based on the series was released in 2000.

== Premise ==
Buzz Lightyear of Star Command is set in a Star Wars–style setting. Capital Planet is the forefront of the Galactic Alliance, a peaceful union of various planets, home to various alien species that coexist in harmony. Star Command is a peacekeeping organization consisting of Space Rangers, who investigate threats to galactic peace. The primary enemy of Star Command is Emperor Zurg, an intergalactic crime boss and warlord who rules Planet Z, with an empire of heavily armed robots and slave races forced to work in opposition to the Galactic Alliance.

The series follows Buzz Lightyear, an experienced and famous Space Ranger who takes a crew of rookies under his wing as he investigates criminal activity across the galaxy and attempts to thwart Zurg's evil plots to overthrow the universe.

== Characters ==
=== Star Command ===
==== Team Lightyear ====
- Buzz Lightyear (voiced by Tim Allen) is a famed Space Ranger and the leader of Team Lightyear. Buzz often suggests that his archenemy Emperor Zurg is behind every evil plot and is often proven correct. Like his Toy Story incarnation, Buzz is idealistic and a stickler for procedure, but will tell a cover story if he needs to. However, he has few people skills, and at times displays a lack of common sense.
- Mira Nova (voiced by Nicole Sullivan) is a rookie ranger and heir to the throne of the planet Tangea who possesses intangibility and telepathy. She acts as Buzz's co-pilot and second-in-command. Mira also has an estranged relationship with her father, King Nova, who disapproves of her choice of being a Space Ranger, though she still cares about him.
- Booster Sinclair Munchapper (voiced by Stephen Furst) is a frog/dinosaur-like alien from the agricultural planet of Jo-ad. He has a big appetite and incredible strength, but is sweet and occasionally naive. He is in awe of Buzz Lightyear and has encyclopedic knowledge of his prior adventures.
- XR: Xperimental Ranger (voiced alternatively by Larry Miller (Note: eps. 1–18, 22, 25–26, 28–29, 33, 35, 37, 40, 42, 45, 47–50, 53, 56, 58–59, 62) and Neil Flynn (Note: eps. 19–21, 23–24, 27, 30–32, 34, 36, 38–39, 41, 43–44, 46, 51–52, 54–55, 57, 60–61)) is a small robot who was originally emotionless and programmed to learn from Buzz, he is the little brother of XL, but was destroyed by Agent Z during his first mission. The LGMs rebuilt him with a slicker, more emotional personality and a variety of unique and unusual attachments. XR is destroyed on nearly every mission he goes on (as it is revealed XR stands for Expendable Ranger), but is easily rebuilt. He considers Commander Nebula his father due to him unintentionally signing the paperwork authorizing his creation and is always seeking his approval, much to his annoyance.

==== Other personnel ====
- Commander Nebula (voiced by Adam Carolla) is the Space Rangers' commander and Buzz's superior, whose left leg was replaced by a pegleg-like plasma cannon. He is rather short-tempered and constantly speaks with a loud voice.
- LGMs, or Little Green Men (voiced by Patrick Warburton) are small, three-eyed aliens who maintain the technology and equipment of Star Command.
- Ty Parsec (voiced by Steve Hytner) is an old comrade of Buzz Lightyear, who is fed up with Buzz always coming to his rescue. In the episodes "Wirewolf" and "Revenge of the Monsters", Parsec is temporarily transformed into the Wirewolf, a robotic werewolf, after being bitten by NOS-4-A2 and exposed to radioactive rock from the moon Canis Lunis.
- Rocket Crocket (voiced by Phil LaMarr) is a member of Star Command and leader of Team Rocket. He has been Buzz's rival since their academy days.
- Fop Doppler (voiced by Rob Paulsen) is a Tangean like Mira. He initially joins the Rangers as a challenge to win her hand in marriage.
- Petra Hammerhold (voiced by Nikki Cox) is Senator Hammerhold's daughter. She joins Star Command when her father forces her to do so, largely to keep her from her boyfriend Plasma Boy. She was initially resentful of this, but was moved by Buzz's heroism during a crisis.
- Plasma Boy (voiced by Michael Showalter) is Petra's boyfriend, who can transform into a plasma monster. Booster competed against him for Petra's affection. Mira and XR inadvertently destabilize Plasma Boy's body, but stabilize him and prevent him from exploding, after which he joins Star Command.
- 42 (voiced by Joy Behar) is Buzz Lightyear's ship. In her self-titled episode, 42 gains a sentient artificial intelligence that is later transferred into a robotic body. Her name is a reference to the number 42 in The hitchhiker's Guide to the Galaxy.

=== Villains ===
==== Main villains ====
- Emperor Zurg (voiced by Wayne Knight): The main antagonist of the series and Buzz's archenemy. Rules an empire on Planet Z and wants to rule the entire universe while destroying Star Command. His feet double as rockets and he can transform his arms into a variety of weapons. Zurg is a stereotypical evil villain, narcissistic and arrogant, willing to do anything by all means to get power or weapons and experiments. However, when Lightyear and him were forced to team up against a villain, Zurg gave Buzz a good combat move and Buzz surprised Zurg by secretly recording the Villain’s true intentions. Even Zurg said himself, “Secretly recording the enemy? Devious, oh Lightyear you do surprise me!”. Knight previously voiced Al McWhiggin in Toy Story 2 (1999).
  - The Grubs (all voiced by Frank Welker) are Zurg's equivalents to the LGMs of Star Command, though far less competent. They perform mechanical and technical duties. The Grubs work for Zurg against their will and desire freedom, but many of them are too afraid to try to defect.
  - The Brain Pods (variously voiced by Jeff Bennett, Dan Castellaneta, Sean Hayes, Tress MacNeille, Jeremy Piven, Paul Rugg, and Frank Welker) are brains in mobile jars, who serve Zurg as scientists and researchers. Although they take pride in their creations, they secretly harbor a desire to escape from Zurg's control as Buzz secretly helps them with that.
  - The Hornets are Zurg's robotic foot soldiers. They are incompetent and easily destroyed. Hornets come in different models, but the most frequently seen are yellow and of average height.
- Warp Darkmatter (voiced by Diedrich Bader) is a former member of Star Command who worked as a double agent for Zurg and eventually began working for him full-time as Agent Z. Darkmatter previously lost his right arm in a cave-in and gained a robotic arm with various weapon attachments after becoming Agent Z. He selfishly faked his death leaving Lightyear in mourning while reappearing as a villain later on to Buzz himself. His ship is styled as a triangular lighter, it is red, gold among other colors. Even as a villain, he asks for Lightyear’s help sometimes which Lightyear is ok with. In the episode “Ancient Evil” a senior version of him portrays his 70s–80s when his youth is sucked out by an ancient mummy. In a later episode, his ship was painted purple to match Zurg’s color. In the episode “Tag Team” some aliens were doing studies on good vs evil and it reveals that Warp Darkmatter is mega rich. In this same episode, it is revealed he owns a full moon and an asteroid in The Hamptons. In this very same episode, it is also revealed that he only worked at Star Command as a front to steal high tech weapons for money.
- Torque (voiced by Brad Garrett) is an alien with four arms and five eyes who has committed various crimes, including terrorism, smuggling, arson, and unpaid parking tickets. He possesses a mechanical cell-separation chest implant created by Zurg that enables him to clone himself.
  - Smeego (voiced by Phil LaMarr) is a small-time crook on Trade World and an acquaintance of Torque.
- Gravitina (voiced by Kerri Kenney-Silver) is a large-headed female villain with mental control over gravity and an ally of Zurg. She is in love with Buzz and later his evil counterpart.
- XL (voiced by Bobcat Goldthwait) is XR's predecessor, who was shut down due to his villainous attitude. When he was reactivated by Zurg, XL rebuilt himself into a larger, more powerful robot with stolen parts with a Frankenstein's monster-like build. In the episode "Revenge of the Monsters", XL reforms and becomes an office-managing robot. XL is also XR’s older brother.
- NOS-4-A2 (voiced by Craig Ferguson) is a robotic vampire created by Zurg who can drain electricity and control any machine he bites. In the episode "Revenge of the Monsters", NOS-4-A2 attempts to transform everyone in the galaxy into robots for him to feed on, but is defeated and destroyed. His name is a parody of Nosferatu.
- Evil Buzz Lightyear (voiced by Patrick Warburton) is an evil counterpart of Buzz Lightyear from an alternate universe where he is an evil emperor instead of Zurg.

==== Recurring villains ====
- Chlorm Scientists - Era (voiced by Jonathan Harris), Eon (voiced by Bill Mumy), and Epoch (voiced by Frank Welker) are Chlorm scientists. They implanted devices into Buzz and Warp Darkmatter during their academy days to study the residents of the galaxy. After Warp first began working for Zurg, at Epoch's suggestion, their study shifted to the differences between good and evil and which was better. Eon preferred the former and Era the latter. After learning of the implants, Buzz and Warp broke into their lab and prematurely ended their study. They were subsequently demoted to zoo and research facilities by their next appearance. Era, Eon, and Epoch began kidnapping Galactic Alliance senators off Capital Planet for the zoo, seeing other races as lesser, wild animals, but Team Lightyear thwarted them.
- Crumford Lorak (voiced by Jon Favreau) is a con artist, reluctant informant, and criminal commonly seen on Trade World. Crumford is in fact one of the Space Rangers best and worst assets when it came to gathering info on major bad guys. The only time when Crumford went big-time was when he impersonated Senator Banda of Bathyos to give information of the Galactic Alliance to Varg.
- Gargantian Militants are tiny beings who hide in robotic exosuits to infiltrate what they desire. The Gargantian Militants hate commercial places on their planets like pizza restaurants as well as the fact that their people joined the Galactic Alliance, preventing war. As a joke, most Gargantian names (as well as the species as a whole) are an ironic pun to their small stature.
  - Tremendor (voiced by Kevin Michael Richardson) is the leader of the Gargantian Militants.
  - Monumentus (voiced by Charles Fleischer) is the second-in-command of the Gargantian Militants.
  - Immensitor (voiced by Kevin Michael Richardson) is a member of the Gargantian Militants.
  - Behemor (voiced by Kevin Michael Richardson) is a member of the Gargantian Militants.
- Rentwhistle Swack (voiced by French Stewart) is an unscrupulous con artist who will do anything for money. He was once arrested by Booster. Swack was first seen poaching creatures on Karn where he also bagged Booster in his hunt. He and his fellow hunters are defeated and sentenced to community service on Karn. Swack later appears as Norbert Klerm's "agent/booker/tour guide" when Klerm makes Buzz and Zurg fight each other.
- Lardak Lurdak (voiced by Kevin Michael Richardson) is a small-time criminal in a dome helmet.
- Norbert Q. Klerm (voiced by Mitchell Whitfield) is the rich and ruthless head of the business company "Compu-klerm." He is friends with the Madame President. He first appeared to make Buzz Lightyear and Zurg fight each other. He later brainwashed Buzz into thinking he is a Compu-klerm employee named "Flip Faxtoner". His plans were ultimately thwarted by Buzz when he came to his senses and replaced his bots' brains with a fellow co-worker.
- The Raenoks are the fiercest aliens in the Galaxy.
  - Kleev (voiced by Clancy Brown) is the leader of the Raenoks and Minister of Schemes and Treachery.
  - Varg (voiced by Kevin Michael Richardson) is the ambassador of the Raenoks and the supreme commander of the Raenok military.
- The Tangean Grounders are round-dwellers of Tangea that often clash with the Tangeans. They can explode things with their minds. Grounders and Tangeans lose their respective super-abilities when close to each other.
  - Grounder Clay (voiced by Jess Harnell) is a Tangean Gronder.
  - Grounder Marl (voiced by John Kassir) is a Tangean Grounder.
  - Romac (voiced by David James Elliott) is a Tangean Grounder and bounty hunter who was Mira's ex-boyfriend, was hired by Zurg to obtain Brain Pod #57.
- The Roswellean Major (voiced by Peter MacNicol) is an unnamed member of Planet Roswell's military who captured Team Lightyear hoping to dissect them. After they got away, he was demoted to Private by his General. He later sided with Zurg in his domination of Roswell which is thwarted by Buzz and Booster and was arrested for collaborating. Roswellians are based on how aliens were described at the time of the Roswell incident.

==== One-shot villains ====
The following one-shot villains are listed in order of appearance:

- Angstrom (voiced by David Warner) is the lord of Tangea, former royal Chancellor and King Nova's closest adviser, before he worked with the Tangean Grounders to overthrow King Nova.
- Minister Gularis (voiced by Harvey Korman) is a shark-like Bathyosian minister and leader of the Bathyosian Council who is secretly head of the B.A.R.R. (Bathyosians Against Air-Breathers) movement. He wears a device with mechanical arms.
- Professor Spyro Von Madman (voiced by Ryan Stiles) was originally Spyro Lepton, a former Star Command scientist. His banned experiments lead to his transformation into a Cryborg, a crystalline entity who can empower himself by absorbing electricity. After years of plotting revenge on Buzz Lightyear and a rampage on Capital Planet, he is restored to normal by his daughter Bonnie Lepton. He has supposedly reformed.
  - Bonnie Lepton (voiced by Tara Strong) is the daughter of Spyro Lepton. Though she is not evil, Bonnie has been helping her father in his experiments. She develops a crush on Buzz Lightyear and helps in stopping her father. However, she is resentful that both Buzz and her father treat her like a child.
- Vartkes (voiced by Ricardo Montalbán) is a gas baron who Buzz encounters after temporarily resigning from Star Command.
- Flint (voiced by Mark Hamill) is an android stockboy who got tired of his forced labor and planned revenge. He created manta ray-like shriekers to attack ships, resulting in castaways on the planet his shriekers were built. He portrayed himself to be the leader of the village where the castaways resided until he was exposed and defeated by Team Lightyear.
- Keno Kentrix (voiced by Jess Harnell) is a Bathyosian casino owner on Mahambas 6 who secretly smuggles weapons. Keno talks with a New Yorker Sicilian styled Mafia Don/ Mob Boss accent. He enjoys gambling, weapons smuggling, theft, among committing various of other similar crimes. Like most Bathyosians, he is a fish, the two thugs beside him breathe air and held their breaths when Keno raised the water levels in the room where they were standing.
- The Heed are a race of supposedly semi-omnipotent beings who in fact have an ulterior motive, that of conquering the galaxy (much like the Borg in the Star Trek franchise). A Heed named Guzelian (voiced by Eric Idle) used the Grubs and the LGM's to trick the galaxy into believing that he was spreading galactic peace. Once both sides had disable their weapons, the Heed would take the opportunity to strike. However, Buzz and Zurg team up to stop them by broadcasting Guzelian's confession all across the galaxy and destroyed their mothership. They then fled back to their homeworld as both Star Command and Zurg's empire rearmed themselves.
- Smoltz (voiced by Wallace Langham) is from the same alien race as the Madame President. He was a turn-coat working for Zurg when the Madame President's transport crashed on Karn. When Zurg and his Hornets drove away some Karnian creatures, he revealed his true intentions and the reason why Mira Nova was picked for that mission. When Team Lightyear rescue Mira and the Madame President, Smoltz and Zurg pursued them before being chased away by a mother Narlzak and her young.
- The Care-Bots (voiced by Wallace Langham) are robotic butlers built by the owners of an incredibly large spaceship. They are the embodiment of the term, "neat-freak", as they believe that cleanliness is alpha priority. This led to disaster, as they believed that organic beings and XR caused disorder, and for the sake of their pristine spaceship they attempted to "take care of" every living being and XR on the ship using hi-tech freeze rays, including the pilots. This nearly caused their massive shuttle to crash into Capital Planet's sun, which would have caused a supernova and destroyed the surrounding galaxy. They were last seen drifting in space.
- The Shaper Stealer (voiced by Frank Welker) is an evil blanket created by Zurg himself. It can float over life forms such as humans, LGMs among others, it is black in color with blue eyes. The Shape Stealer can use those life forms to attack Buzz Lightyear and can change the minds of the life forms it steals. It was last seen drifting in space when a hole was formed in a ship it was on, it is still alive.
- Natron (voiced by Diedrich Bader) is an ancient evil space mummy. In his time, he ruled the universe as an ultimate "invincible" evil. Defeated and imprisoned by the Protector, he vowed to once again rule the universe, and is awakened by the LGMs on Planet X thousands of years later. He takes Warp's life force and begins using his technology to attack and freeze everyone on Capital Planet. He is stopped when the LGMs returned the stolen life force to warp and is imprisoned again.
- The Valkyran Raiders are female space pirates consisting of Brun, Sig, and Hilda (all voiced by Tress MacNeille). They attack freighters in search of cargo to use for trade and personal use. The mothership of the Valkyran Raiders uses a cloaking device.

=== Galactic Alliance ===
- Madam President (voiced by Roz Ryan) is the head of the Galactic Alliance. Her real name is unknown.
- Senator Aarrfvox (voiced by Jim Cummings) is a Shragorakian senator.
- Senator Banda (voiced by Dan Castellaneta) is a Bathyosian senator.
- Senator Hammerhold (voiced by Corey Burton) is Petra Hammerhold's father.
- Senator Phlegmex (voiced by Frank Welker) is a slime-emitting senator.

=== Other ===
- Becky (voiced by Russi Taylor) is a little alien girl from the planet Roswell. She befriends Booster (whom she calls Pickles) when Team Lightyear's ship crashes on her planet.
- Brent Starkisser (voiced by Corey Burton) is the Galaxy's reporter.
- Buster (voiced by Thomas F Wilson) is Booster’s best friend from Booster’s hometown and planet. He stays on the planet while Booster went off to join The Space Rangers after being a janitor for them. His jealously of Booster’s success got the better of him and he worked for Zurg. He rethinks working for Zurg entirely because he realizes Booster saved his life which made him feel uncomfortable betraying Booster.
- Cosmo (voiced by Paul Rugg) is an alien and the owner of a diner that Team Lightyear frequents. He has a mechanical arm as well as a foreign accent.
- Dr. Animus (voiced by Tony Jay) is the Galaxy's therapist; like most therapists, he is intelligent and takes notes. He called XL “nut-so” thinking it was XR when XL disguised himself.
- Ozma Furbanna (voiced by Linda Hamilton) is a naturalist on the planet Karn. She favors all animals (even lethal carnivores) and hates to have them hurt, no matter what.
- Ed (voiced by Paul Rugg) is a courier who somehow always knows how to track down Buzz Lightyear.
- Officer Panchex (voiced by Brian Doyle-Murray) is a fish policeman who helped Buzz Lightyear fight Minister Gularis.
- Professor Triffid (voiced by Joel Murray) is a scientist from Rhizome. He cares a lot for the plants there.
- Savy SL2 (voiced by Cree Summer) is a young girl whose adopted robot parents were attacked by NOS-4-A2 in "The Slayer", which lead her to hunting him down for revenge.
- Sheriff of Roswell (voiced by Stephen Root) is Becky's father and an ally of Team Lightyear.
- King Nova (voiced by John O'Hurley) is Mira's father and the ruler of Tangea. Being more tradition bound he clearly disapproves of his daughter being a Space Ranger and therefore has a complicated relationship with her as well as Buzz. But regardless of his pompous nature he still cares about his daughter and is willing to aid her.
- Santa Claus (voiced by Earl Boen) is the holiday figure, who delivers presents to all the good people in the galaxy during Christmas. He uses a sleigh powered by belief and later time manipulation to accomplish this.
- The Fixer (voiced by Ed Asner) is a trader from Trade World who sells robotic parts.

== Episodes ==
Production codes were taken from the Library of Congress.

No.	Title	Directed by	Written by	Original release date	Prod. code	Network
1	"The Torque Armada"	Don MacKinnon	Gary Sperling	October 2, 2000	003	UPN
After Torque's (voiced by Brad Garrett) arrest at the hands of team Lightyear, Zurg's Hornets spring Torque from a prison transport and have him brought to Planet Z. Zurg fuses a device that allows Torque to clone himself, and the criminal uses his new posse to wreak havoc in the space lanes. After team Lightyear manages to undo their trouble, they and other Space Rangers bring in Torque and his clones.
2	"Gravitina"	Victor Cook	Kevin Hopps & Tad Stones	October 3, 2000	004	UPN
Star Command is directly in the path of an asteroid field. Buzz and the Rangers respond to the emergency and start to destroy the asteroids, but they keep on coming. The asteroids appear to be under some power source that is aiming them at Star Command. Buzz and XR take off to find the source of the asteroid attack and Mira Nova and Booster stay behind to help Star Command. The source of the attack is an evil, female, big-headed alien known as Gravitina, the Mistress of Mass and she has a big crush on Buzz, thus holding Star Command hostage unless Buzz submits into marrying her.
3	"XL"	Don MacKinnon	Rick Gitelson	October 4, 2000	007	UPN
After a series of high tech robberies the team decides to put XR as bait to lure the robber who turns out to be a previous experimental robotic ranger XL (voiced by Bobcat Goldthwait). Revenge driven, XL kidnaps Commander Nebula, and XR proves himself to Nebula by putting a stop to his manic predecessor.
4	"Little Secrets"	Victor Cook	Nick DuBois	October 5, 2000	020	UPN
While searching for a spy, Mira, Booster and XR also have to keep Buzz from learning secrets they are keeping from him.
5	"Inside Job"	Victor Cook	Adam Armus & Nora Kay Foster	October 6, 2000	026	UPN
Buzz teams up with Space Ranger Flash Flemming to stop the assassination of the Ambassador of Gargantia. Booster feels pathetic compared to the new recruit, only to discover Flemming is actually a robot suit of Gartantian rebels seeking to kill the Ambassador.
6	"NOS-4-A2"	Victor Cook	Michael A. Medlock	October 8, 2000	001	UPN
After Team Lightyear rescues a mysterious box from a cargo freighter that is under attack by Warp Darkmatter, they bring the box back to Star Command, unaware that they are actually falling right into Zurg's evil trap. The box contains a robotic energy vampire named NOS-4-A2 (voiced by Craig Ferguson), who was created by Zurg to destroy Star Command using his ability to control any machine he bites, including XR!
7	"The Planet Destroyer"	Don MacKinnon	John Behnke, Rob Humphrey, & Jim Peterson	October 9, 2000	006	UPN
Zurg has created a Planet Destroying super weapon capable of destroying planets from great distances, including Mira's home world of Tangea. Now Team Lightyear has to find it, before the Alliance signs over their lives to Zurg. Mira meanwhile is strangely certain her people are still alive.
8	"The Beasts of Karn"	Steve Loter	Ken Koonce & Michael Merton	October 10, 2000	010	UPN
A scientist on planet Karn asks for Buzz's help to stop the poaching of native animals. Booster is kidnapped by said poacher, mistaking him for a rare species.
9	"Tag Team"	Victor Cook	Greg Johnson	October 11, 2000	016	UPN
Buzz and Warp Darkmatter discover that they were given implants years ago, so the pair team up to discover who gave them the implants and why. They encounter three scientists of an alien race who analyze Buzz and Warp's pasts to determine the utility and purpose of good and evil.
10	"The Main Event"	Victor Cook	Written by : Gary Sperling; Story by : Gary Sperling & Cade Chilcoat	October 12, 2000	019	UPN
Buzz and XR find themselves on a barren planet, fighting a series of gladiators.
11	"The Return of XL"	Steve Loter	Cade Chilcoat	October 13, 2000	008	UPN
XL kidnaps XR and steals a vital component of his. Feeling depressed and neglected, XR runs off to Tradeworld in an attempt to be properly fixed, but only runs into more trouble when XL decides to finish the job.
12	"Lost in Time"	Steve Loter	Bill Motz & Bob Roth	October 14, 2000	002	ABC
When Buzz travels into a Black Hole, Zurg uses it to trick him into thinking he is in the future and collect all of his secrets in his latest attempt to destroy Star Command. Zurg nearly succeeds as he determines a hidden weakness on the space station, and Buzz's team manage to escape and help him break free from the illusion before Star Command is obliterated.
13	"Strange Invasion"	Don MacKinnon	Greg Johnson	October 15, 2000	027	UPN
Team Lightyear are pushed into the unexplored regions of the galaxy by a supernova and crash on planet Roswell. Booster befriends one of the locals, Becky, forcing a prison break.
14	"The Taking of PC-7"	Don MacKinnon	Kevin Hopps	October 16, 2000	018	UPN
Booster and XR take Torque to prison planetoid PC-7, but Torque engineers a jailbreak with the help of a personality changing helmet.
15	"Mindwarp"	Steve Loter	Elizabeth Stonecipher	October 17, 2000	017	UPN
Klerm kidnaps Buzz and uses his mind to create an army of Slam-Bots.
16	"Mira's Wedding"	Don MacKinnon	Written by : Michael Price; Story by : Richard Mueller	October 18, 2000	024	UPN
Lord Angstrom (voiced by David Warner) arranges Mira to wed Fop Doppler as a distraction for his plot to overthrow King Nova (voiced by John O'Hurley).
17	"Panic on Bathyos"	Victor Cook	Cade Chilcoat	October 19, 2000	031	UPN
Team Lightyear is sent to Bathyos to find who is helping smugglers steal fusion crystals.
18	"Shiv Katall"	Victor Cook	Bill Motz & Bob Roth	October 20, 2000	015	UPN
Brain Pod #13 defects from Zurg's service and Zurg either wants him back or destroyed. He calls on the galaxy's most infamous man hunter Shiv Katall to get the job done. When word gets to Star Command that Katall has been called, Buzz goes after him and dismisses the rest of the team. Mira doesn't like this and decides to intervene in the mission and find Katall. When the team does locate Katall, he isn't quite the villain they thought him to be.
19	"Rookie of the Year"	Victor Cook	Adam Armus & Nora Kay Foster	October 21, 2000	052	ABC
Mira, Booster, and XR are all nominated for the "Rookie of the Year" award. Zurg steals a new matter transporter whilst the three become more competitive with each other to impress Buzz the most, leaving them in more than a sticky situation.
20	"Stress Test"	Don MacKinnon	Mark Palmer	October 22, 2000	048	UPN
After working himself too hard, Buzz is forced to take a vacation to Rhizome, forcing to give up all weaponry. Which puts Star Command in trouble when Zurg uses it as the site to launch his Hyper Death Ray at Star Command.
21	"A Zoo Out There"	Don MacKinnon	Drew Daywalt & David Schneider	October 23, 2000	047	UPN
Ambassadors are being kidnapped from Capital Planet and Buzz must locate them.
22	"Root of Evil"	Steve Loter	Brian Swenlin	October 24, 2000	028	UPN
Team Lightyear investigates mutant vegetables that are terrorizing planet Jo-Ad, which come from Booster's family farm. Unaware, Zurg has some help from Booster's best friend.
23	"Super Nova"	Don MacKinnon	John Behnke, Rob Humphrey, and Jim Peterson	October 25, 2000	053	UPN
To succeed in their latest mission, Mira uses her ghosting powers to walk into a Crystallic Fusion Generator. She emerges as a glowing, hyper-active ranger. Despite her father's warnings on how dangerous this new power is, Mira begins using her new powers to the extreme, eventually falling into the temptation of taking on Zurg by herself.
24	"Downloaded"	Victor Cook	James W. Bates	October 26, 2000	039	UPN
While trying to preserve the Galactic Alliance's supercomputer from a hit by Darkmatter, XR downloads all the Galactic Alliance files into his brain, making himself a target.
25	"The Plasma Monster"	Don MacKinnon	Michael A. Medlock	October 27, 2000	013	UPN
While escorting a dignitary's daughter for Star Command training, the team encounters a plasma monster (voiced by Michael Showalter) who, in fact, is Plasma Boy, the girl's boyfriend. Things turn serious after a smitten Booster starts a fight with him.
26	"Wirewolf"	Steve Loter	Ken Koonce, Michael Merton, & Richard Mueller	October 28, 2000	011	ABC
Space Ranger Ty Parsec helps Buzz fight NOS-4-A2, but a bite from the energy vampire and the radiation on Canis Lunis turns Ty into the Wirewolf. Buzz and his team face the Wirewolf as they work out how to free Ty from his newfound curse.
27	"The Crawling Flesh"	Steve Loter	Michael A. Medlock	October 29, 2000	036	UPN
Zurg mutates all of Star Command into blob monsters, who must defeat Zurg despite their transformation.
28	"Dirty Work"	Victor Cook	Bob Forward, Ken Koonce, & Michael Merton	October 30, 2000	023	UPN
When demand becomes high, Cosmo (voiced by Paul Rugg) orders a K-5000 Uni-appliance that multi-tasks all of the kitchen's jobs for his diner. However, when NOS-4-A2 bites it, the appliance seizes entire control of the diner. Team Lightyear, much to Buzz's chagrin, has to rely on Professor Triffid's unique genetic technologies to return the diner back to normal.
29	"The Slayer"	Steve Loter	Ken Koonce and Michael Merton	October 31, 2000	051	UPN
Buzz and XR team up with a young street girl named Savy SL2 to track down and stop NOS-4-A2 when he goes on a monstrous predatory hunt for robots on Trade World.
30	"The Lightyear Factor"	Steve Loter	Julia Lewald	November 1, 2000	056	UPN
Zurg accidentally opens a portal to an alternate universe and unleashes an evil, tyrannical Buzz Lightyear onto his world. Now with the evil Buzz in his dimension, the heroic Buzz must fend off the doppelgangers of his friends who want to see Buzz Lightyear destroyed while his team must find a way to survive the new rise of evil.
31	"Clone Rangers"	Steve Loter	Greg Weisman	November 2, 2000	032	UPN
Zurg creates clones of Buzz, Mira and Booster. However the Brain Pods create the clones at Age 12. Now Team Lightyear has to deal with their villainous matches on the theme park planet Corny World.
32	"Bunzel Fever"	Steve Loter	Jules Dennis, Elizabeth Stonecipher, and Jess Winfield	November 3, 2000	044	UPN
Team Lightyear has been running themselves ragged trying to catch Torque and XL. However Booster is asked to return home for the Bunzel harvest. Against his grandfather's advice, Booster continues the investigation, catching Bunzel fever mutating him into a feral beast.
33	"Rescue Mission"	Don MacKinnon	Alexx Van Dyne	November 4, 2000	014	ABC
Buzz is shrunk down so that he can assist them against a threat. However, the threat turns out to be the rest of Team Lightyear, who are stuck helping Cosmo pass a health inspection from Bugs, the people who contacted Buzz.
34	"Devolutionaries"	Chris Rutkowski and Don MacKinnon	Doug Langdale	November 5, 2000	043	UPN
Team Lightyear visits Binipinardia, where they discover Warp Darkmatter is de-evolving people with a new gas. Now XR must lead his de-evolved team to take Warp down.
35	"Head Case"	Don MacKinnon	Jess Winfield	November 6, 2000	035	UPN
When XR is damaged in a battle, XL kidnaps him while he is being repaired. Now with XL posing as XR to plant a bomb inside Star Command, XR must use XL's body to stop him.
36	"The Yukari Imprint"	Victor Cook	Cade Chilcoat	November 7, 2000	038	UPN
Buzz and his team offer to protect the ambassador and his delegates. However Booster buys an egg, believing it will hatch into a cute pet. Unaware said egg ends up mass producing miniaturized Booster clones.
37	"The Shape Stealer"	Don MacKinnon	Written by : Bill Motz and Bob Roth; Story by : Greg Johnson	November 8, 2000	040	UPN
Zurg creates an assassin capable of taking over other people's bodies and sends it after Buzz. Unfortunately, it takes control of Buzz and later Star Command.
38	"Star Crossed"	Victor Cook	Greg Weisman	November 9, 2000	042	UPN
When one of Zurg's brain pods defects, he hires a bounty hunter, Mira's ex-boyfriend, to bring it back.
39	"Haunted Moon"	Don MacKinnon	Mark Palmer	November 10, 2000	060	UPN
Buzz and his team fight a ghost trying to disrupt their mission to save a planet.
40	"Star Smasher"	Steve Loter	Brian Swenlin	November 11, 2000	009	ABC
One of the Little Green Men goes missing during an attack and Zurg plans to use his knowledge to create a Flux Gravity Capacitor. With it, Zurg plans to collapse the sun Capital Planet orbits into a black hole to destroy it and Star Command completely.
41	"Stranger Invasion"	Steve Loter	Michael Merton	November 12, 2000	050	UPN
Booster gets in trouble when he is discovered to still be in contact with Becky from Roswell, even though Roswell is still an undeveloped world. Around that time Zurg invades Roswell and takes it over, with plans to build and deploy a surprise attack fleet to conquer Capital Planet. When Buzz decides to take Booster with him to Roswell's system on a patrol mission to cheer him up, they discover this, and the two must work with Roswell's military at foiling Zurg's plan of converting the planet into a massive duplicate of Planet Z.
42	"Eye of the Tempest"	Victor Cook	Robert Askin	November 13, 2000	034	UPN
Mad scientist Spyro Lepton (voiced by Ryan Stiles) uses a distress signal to lure Buzz into a trap so he can enact his revenge. With his daughter's help, Buzz tries to stop the newly named Von Madman before his corrupted new form gets the better of him.
43	"Revenge of the Monsters"	Steve Loter	Nick DuBois	November 14, 2000	045	UPN
XL and NOS-4-A2 infiltrate Star Command to turn Ty Parsec back into the Wirewolf. With NOS-4-A2 now in control of Planet Z converting most of Star Command and the Galactic Alliance into Wirewolves too, XR and Buzz must convince XL to be a space ranger again. The unlikely trio must work together in a final battle against the robotic vampire and his cybernetic werewolves.
44	"Lone Wolf"	Denise Koyama	Eddie Guzelian	November 15, 2000	054	UPN
Because of lack of evidence, a criminal is about to walk free, making the team depressed. Buzz tells them about how in his initial years when he got depressed due to a similar incident and what inspired him to rejoin Star Command as a Space Ranger.
45	"Planet of the Lost"	Steve Loter	Jan Strnad	November 16, 2000	061	UPN
While investigating the disappearance of ships around a planet which looks like a desert but shows a significant amount of technology, the team ends up stranded along with all the people who crashed there with Flynn (voiced by Mark Hamill) as their leader, but on detailed inspection they realize that the Shriekers that caused the crash only wanted to trap people and mystery follows.
46	"Revenge of the Raenoks"	Steve Loter	Adam Armus & Nora Kay Foster	November 17, 2000	066	UPN
Booster is taken prisoner by the Raenoks, who plan to use him for a prisoner exchange to get their leader, Varg, back. Buzz and Mira set out to rescue him, using a new cloaking device developed by the LGMs.
47	"Enemy Without a Face"	Victor Cook	Elizabeth Stonecipher	November 18, 2000	030	ABC
Team Lightyear is caught between two races who have been at war for 900 years. Team Lightyear discovers it is actually the work of aggression-inducing parasites, which make their way into Star Command, forcing XR to save the day.
48	"The Starthought"	Don MacKinnon	Lisa Klink	November 19, 2000	021	UPN
Star Command is given a new ship controlled by the mind of the pilot, but Zurg soon takes it for himself, with Team Lightyear and especially Mira having to work out how to stop him.
49	"Millennial Bugs"	Victor Cook	Nick DuBois	November 20, 2000	063	UPN
Zurg steals fossilized Millennial Bug eggs and attempts to hatch them.
50	"Conspiracy"	Steve Loter	Eddie Guzelian	November 21, 2000	033	UPN
The Gargantians pose as Buzz in an attempt to get the Galactic President assassinated during the signing of a historic peace initiative. An innocent Buzz is soon jailed for the crime and must break out of prison to find out who is setting him up.
51	"At Large on a Small Planet"	Don MacKinnon	Adam Armus and Nora Kay Foster	November 23, 2000	058	UPN
Ambassador Ursona is kidnapped while on planet Gargantia, forcing Buzz and Booster to shrink down and find him to put a stop to the Gargantian militant movement once and for all.
52	"Sunquake"	Don MacKinnon	Eddie Guzelian	November 24, 2000	057	UPN
The evil Buzz from another dimension returns and teams up with Gravitina to besmirch Buzz's good name.
53	"Good Ol' Buzz"	Steve Loter	Leslie Nordman	November 25, 2000	022	ABC
A Buzz from 150 years in the future arrives to help save Mira from being killed.
54	"First Missions"	Victor Cook	Bill Motz & Bob Roth	November 26, 2000	059	UPN
While they are pinned down by Zurg's Hornets while protecting Professor Reddshift (voiced by Robert Picardo), to help boost Reddshift's confidence that Buzz will save them in time, Mira, Booster, and XR tell him the stories of when each of them first met Buzz; this inspires Reddshift to help Lightyear in a massive robot battle between Buzz and Zurg.
55	"Large Target"	Don MacKinnon	Written by : Zach Stones; Story by : Tad Stones	November 27, 2000	046	UPN
During a vacation XR impersonates Booster so he can gamble at a casino, but soon attracts more trouble than he was prepared for.
56	"War and Peace and War"	Victor Cook	Gary Sperling	November 29, 2000	064	UPN
When the supremely powerful Guzelian tries to usher in a new era of peace, everyone is elated, except for Buzz and Zurg, who agree to work together to find Guzelian's true intentions. Both hero and villain uncover and put a stop to an impending invasion by Guzelian's race, the Heed.
57	"Return to Karn"	Victor Cook	Bill Motz & Bob Roth	December 2, 2000	037	ABC
Mira and Madame President are shot down over planet Karn and must elude Zurg as he hunts for them.
58	"Speed Trap"	Steve Loter	John Behnke, Rob Humphrey & Jim Peterson	December 9, 2000	029	ABC
During traffic duty, Team Lightyear finds a ship traveling towards a sun, threatening to destroy it on impact.
59	"Holiday Time"	Victor Cook	Mark Palmer	December 16, 2000	062	ABC
Buzz and the gang must help Santa (voiced by Earl Boen) to save the holiday from the Evil Emperor Zurg.
60	"Opposites Attract"	Don MacKinnon	Mark Palmer	December 23, 2000	041	ABC
Gravitina causes Buzz's head to swell to enormous size, like hers, hoping this will cause Buzz to fall in love with her.
61	"Ancient Evil"	Steve Loter	Jim Staahl & Jim Fisher	January 6, 2001	049	ABC
A group of LGMs awaken the ancient space mummy Natron and Zurg insists Warp bring the mummy to him. With Warp reduced to an old man, Buzz insists on helping his old friend, and the two former partners team up to defeat the ancient evil.
62	"42"	Don MacKinnon	John Behnke, Rob Humphrey & Jim Peterson	January 13, 2001	025	ABC
A group of Valkyrans attempt to seize control of a cargo ship. At the same time, Buzz Lightyear's ship 42 develops her own personality, and a relationship with XR.

== Broadcast and syndication ==
The series was aired during UPN's Disney's One Too programming block from October 2000 to August 2003. One episode, "Super Nova", aired twice during its original run. It also aired on Disney Channel from June 5, 2006, to May 16, 2008, when it was taken off the air in the U.S. Two episodes, "Conspiracy" and "Inside Job", were rarely seen after the September 11 attacks. The show also aired on Toon Disney from August 31, 2003 to May 27, 2007 as well as on the network's Jetix block for a brief time in 2004.

== Production ==
In May 2000, it was announced Walt Disney Television Animation would be producing an animated series based on the character of Buzz Lightyear from Toy Story with Patrick Warburton set to voice the titular character. 65 episodes were announced for broadcast in fall of that year, 52 of which would be broadcast on UPN's Disney's One Too while the other 13 would be broadcast on ABC's Disney's One Saturday Morning. While the majority of the animation was done by Disney Television Animation, Pixar provided animation for the show's opening sequence. Other animation houses involved in the production included Tama Productions, Sunwoo Entertainment, Sunmin Image Pictures, Sae Hahn Productions, Hana Animation, Jade Animation, Wang Film Productions and Toon City.

== Awards and nominations ==
- Daytime Emmy Awards

2001 – Outstanding Sound Editing - Special Class – Jennifer Mertens, Paca Thomas, Otis Van Osten, Rick Hammel, Eric Hertsguaard, Robbi Smith, Brian F. Mars, Marc S. Perlman, and Dominick Certo (won)

== Video game ==
A video game titled Buzz Lightyear of Star Command was developed by Traveller's Tales and published by Activision, and released for PlayStation, Game Boy Color, Microsoft Windows, and Dreamcast in 2000. The gameplay revolves around Buzz chasing down the various villains from the show, and defeating them using different color coded weapons.

== See also ==
- Lightyear, 2022 Pixar film
