= Hercules (1998 TV series) =

American animated television series

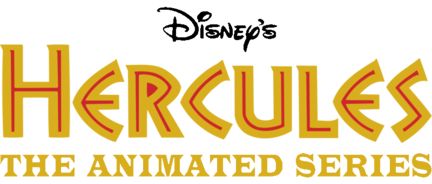
- Also known as: Disney's Hercules: The Animated Series
- Genre: Comedy; Fantasy; Superhero
- Based on: Hercules by Walt Disney Feature Animation
- Developed by: Tad Stones
- Directed by: Phil Weinstein; Eddy Houchins; Bob Kline; Jamie Thomason (dialogue)
- Voices of: Tate Donovan; Robert Costanzo; French Stewart; Sandra Bernhard; James Woods; Bobcat Goldthwait; Matt Frewer; Corey Burton; Frank Welker; Paul Shaffer; Diedrich Bader; Jodi Benson; Robert Stack; Linda Hamilton; Lisa Kudrow
- Theme music composer: Alan Menken
- Composers: Adam Berry; J. Eric Schmidt
- Country of origin: United States
- Original language: English
- No. of seasons: 2
- No. of episodes: 65 (list of episodes)

Production
- Executive producer: Tad Stones
- Producers: Mark McCorkle; Robert Schooley
- Running time: 23 minutes
- Production company: Walt Disney Television Animation (Note: Animation outsourced to Toon City, Walt Disney Animation Japan, Jade Animation, Sunwoo Entertainment, Plus One Animation, Sunmin Image Pictures, Slightly Off Beat Productions, Walt Disney Animation Australia, Wang Film Productions, Hanho Heung-Up, Hana Animation and Tama Production with additional production outsourced to Thai Wang Film Productions, Frontier Pictures, Studio Basara, Win Wood Productions, Nakamura Production, Delta Peak Production and Philippine Animation Studio.)

Original release
- Network: Syndication
- Release: August 31, 1998 – March 1, 1999
- Network: ABC
- Release: September 12, 1998 – January 16, 1999

Disney's Hercules: The Animated Series, simply known as Hercules, is an American animated television series that is a prequel to the 1997 film of the same name and the Greek myth. The series followed Hercules as a teenager, in training to be a hero, prior to the events of the film.

The series premiered in syndication on August 31, 1998, and on ABC through its Disney's One Saturday Morning block on September 12, 1998. The syndicated run lasted 52 episodes, while the ABC run lasted 13 episodes.

== Plot ==
The series follows Hercules, as a teenager, training as a hero, while trying to navigate everyday life. With his free-spirited friend Icarus, his future-seeing friend Cassandra, and his trainer Philoctetes ("Phil"), he battles his evil uncle Hades. Like all teenagers, though, Hercules has to worry about peer pressure when the snobbish prince Adonis ridicules him. The series notably contradicts several events and plot points in the original film. A notable example is Hades knowing Hercules is alive when he is still a teenager, when in the film, he found out when Hercules reached adulthood.

== Episodes ==
| Season | Episodes | Originally released | | |
| Season | Episodes | First released | Last released | Network |
|---|---|---|---|---|
| 1 | 52 | August 31, 1998 | March 1, 1999 | Syndication |
| 2 | 13 | September 12, 1998 | January 16, 1999 | ABC |

== Characters ==
A majority of the cast from the film reprised their roles for the series.

- Hercules (voiced by Tate Donovan) – The hero-in-training and the son of both Zeus and Hera, in contrast to the original myth of being half-mortal, half-god. Despite this, Hercules has been referred to as a demigod throughout the series. Hercules fluctuates between being a fearless youth in his hero training and a socially awkward teenager who goes about inadvertently destroying things or humiliating himself.
- Philoctetes (voiced by Robert Costanzo) – The satyr hero trainer who serves as Hercules's coach, best friend and sidekick. In the series, his training with Odysseus and Achilles remains intact. When asked about teenage Hercules' time attending Prometheus Academy, Phil told Megara it wasn't the most graceful period of Herc's life, partly because of Herc's flaws from his awkward phase as well as at one point sinking Phil's island briefly. Phil is one of the few characters from the original movie whose voice actor (Danny DeVito) did not return.
- Pegasus (voiced by Frank Welker) – The winged horse "with the brain of a bird" formed from clouds by Zeus, he is the childhood pet and confidant of his owner Hercules.
- Icarus (voiced by French Stewart) – Hercules' best friend, the boy who escaped from a labyrinth with his father on wax wings appears as an eccentric hippie (he was "brain-fried" by flying too close to the Sun). Despite his accident, Icarus still flies every chance he gets. His habit has resulted in a few more encounters with the Sun and other perils, often requiring Hercules to rescue him. Icarus is very adaptive, hence could adjust to about every situation, except when he is very jealous and acts irrationally. He could become an ultraserious soldier at boot camp or a nearly identical version of Hades himself. Thankfully, at the end of each episode, he reverts to his own odd self. He is also completely obsessed with Cassandra and flirts with her at every opportunity he gets. His father, Daedalus (voiced by David Hyde Pierce), is a teacher in the academy and Icarus does not acknowledge his parents' divorce. When Icarus graduates, he goes into inventing with his father and makes a fortune, earning the commercial title "Icarus, the Wax-Wing King".
- Cassandra (voiced by Sandra Bernhard) – The Trojan War prophet appears as an attractive, yet antisocial girl, who has visions of the future (usually bad) once in a while, which are rarely believed. Icarus is obsessed with marrying her, though she has shown she has no reciprocation. She tolerated his presence even before Hercules joined the trio because otherwise, she would have had no friends. Even after she gained Hercules as a friend, she still continues to socialize with Icarus. She even admitted to him that she considers him a good friend. After graduating, she joins the Oracle Friends Network. Cassandra and Icarus are the only regular characters that were not featured in the film.
- Zeus (voiced by Corey Burton) – Hercules' father and king of the gods, he is always ready to provide advice on hero work, but is often prone to mistakes and recklessness, himself.
- Hades (voiced by James Woods) – Ruler of the Greek Underworld as well as Hercules' uncle and nemesis, he is fast-talking, duplicitous, and fiery-tempered; he constantly schemes to steal control of Mount Olympus from his brother Zeus. While the film never specified the relationship between Zeus and Hades, the series often highlights that Hades and Zeus (as well as Poseidon) are brothers.
- Pain and Panic (voiced by Bobcat Goldthwait and Matt Frewer) – Two tiny shapeshifting imps, they are Hades' incompetent henchmen.

== Production ==
=== Development ===
The series was produced by Tad Stones, who had previously produced and directed the animated television series Aladdin. The directors of Hercules, John Musker and Ron Clements, jokingly said to him while the film was being produced: "Hey, Tad, we're doing a pilot for a series". The producers decided that the irreverence of the movie would be captured more easily by setting it within the events of the movie, with Stones declaring that "by ignoring continuity and trying to stay true to the elements of humor and adventure in the film, we came up with a much stronger series that really stands on its own". Since James Woods signed to voice Hades again, along with most of the cast of the film, many big-name actors were interested in taking part on the show. Over 150 celebrities took a part in the series, some self-lampooning: Merv Griffin played a griffin talk show host, game show host Wink Martindale played a riddle-expert sphinx and Mike Connors, famous for Mannix, played Athenian policeman Chipacles (named after CHiPs).

Disney's revamping of Greek legend moved to the small screen in the late summer of 1998. Disney's Hercules had the Greek god still in "geek god" mode, before his "Zero to Hero" transformation. In the series, "Herc" was enrolled at Prometheus Academy, a school for both gods and mortals. Since events occur before young Herc meets and falls for the lovely Megara (Meg), he is joined by two new friends Cassandra (voiced by comedian Sandra Bernhard) and Icarus (voiced by French Stewart).

=== Animation ===
The series' episodes and the direct-to-video film Hercules: Zero to Hero were animated by Toon City Animation, Inc. and Philippine Animation Studio Inc. in the Philippines, Walt Disney Animation Australia in Australia, Walt Disney Animation (Japan), Inc., Anime Workshop Basara, Tama Production, Delta Peak Productions, Frontier Pictures, and Nakamura Productions in Japan, Win Wood Productions Company in the United Kingdom, Wang Film Productions Co., Ltd. in Taiwan, Thai Wang Film Productions Co., Ltd. in Thailand, Hanho Heung-Up Co., Ltd., Plus One Animation, Inc., Sunmin Image Pictures Co., Ltd., Sunwoo Animation, Korea, and Hana Animation in South Korea, Jade Animation in China, and S.O.B. Animation Group, Ltd. in New Zealand.

== Release ==
=== Broadcast ===
In 2000, Hercules moved to the now-defunct channel Toon Disney, where it continued airing until 2009. Disney XD aired the series for the first time in June 2011, when the channel launched in Canada.

=== Streaming ===
Currently, the entire series is available on Disney+ in the US, with all episodes being listed as one season.

== Reception ==
=== Critical ===
CommonSenseMedia gave the series a rating of 4 stars out of 5, noting that this "better-than-average spinoff has heart and brawn." Calhoun Times and Gordon County News gave the series 3 stars out of 4.

=== Awards and nominations ===
| Year | Nominee / work | Award | Result |
|---|---|---|---|
| 1999 | Jennifer E. Mertens, Robert Duran, Paca Thomas, Marc Perlman, Brian F. Mars, Melissa Ellis, Robbi Smith, Robert Poole III, Rick Hammel, Kenneth D. Young, Charles Rychwalski, Eric Hertsgaard, William Kean, David Lynch and Otis Van Osten | Emmy Award for Outstanding Sound Editing – Special Class | Nominated |
| 1999 | Casey Stone for episode "Twilight of the Gods" | Golden Reel Award for Best Sound Editing – Television Animation – Music | Nominated |
| 2000 | James Woods for playing "Hades" | Emmy Award for Outstanding Performer in an Animated Program | Won |
| 2000 | French Stewart for playing "Icarus" | Emmy Award for Outstanding Performer in an Animated Program | Nominated |
| 2000 | Marc S. Perlman, Robert Duran and Paca Thomas | Emmy Award for Outstanding Sound Editing – Special Class | Nominated |

== Home media ==
Four episodes of Hercules were reformatted into the movie Hercules: Zero to Hero and released to home video in 1999. The episode "Hercules and the Yearbook" serves as the linking narrative, with random clips replaced with the episodes "Hercules and the First Day of School", "Hercules and the Grim Avenger" and "Hercules and the Visit From Zeus". Some of the dialogue between Hercules and Meg was altered to fit the episodes.

In 2003, a further VHS tape titled Hercules: TV Series was released in the United Kingdom. It contained two episodes of the series, Hercules and the World's First Doctor and Hercules and the Secret Weapon.

== See also ==
- List of films featuring Hercules
