= Mark McCorkle =

American screenwriter, television writer and television producer

- Born: United States
- Occupations: Screenwriter, television writer, film and television producer
- Years active: 1983-present
- Known for: Co-creating Kim Possible

Mark McCorkle is an American screenwriter, television writer and film and television producer. He is co-creator of the Disney Channel animated series Kim Possible. He frequently collaborates with fellow writer Bob Schooley. Prior to Kim Possible, McCorkle, Schooley, and the main director of Kim Possible, Steve Loter, also held their respective jobs (writer/producer and director respectively) on Buzz Lightyear of Star Command. He worked on DreamWorks Animation's The Penguins of Madagascar as a producer along with Schooley, once more with regular voices Sullivan and John DiMaggio. From 2017 to 2021, McCorkle and Schooley created and executive produced an animated series based on the 2014 Disney film Big Hero 6 for Disney XD and Disney Channel.

He has also written screenplays for Aladdin: The Return of Jafar, Aladdin and the King of Thieves, The Lion King II: Simba's Pride, Sky High and Hotel for Dogs as well as co-writer again with Bob Schooley of the novel Liar of Kudzu.

== Filmography ==
- Maxie's World - recording assistant (1987)
- The Real Ghostbusters - writer (1 episode), recording assistant (1988-1990)
- ALF Tales - recording assistant (1988)
- ALF - recording assistant (1988-1989)
- C.O.P.S. - writer (2 episodes), recording assistant (1988-1989)
- The New Adventures of Beany and Cecil - recording assistant (1988)
- G.I. Joe: Operation Dragonfire (1989)
- Ring Raiders - casting director (1989)
- Captain N: The Game Master - recording assistant (1989)
- Captain Planet and the Planeteers – writer (1 episode), recording assistant (1990–1991)
- Teenage Mutant Ninja Turtles - writer (1 episode) (1989)
- The Karate Kid - recording assistant (1989)
- Camp Candy - recording assistant (1989)
- New Kids on the Block – writer (7 episodes) (1989)
- The Super Mario Bros. Super Show! – writer (5 episodes), recording assistant (1989)
- Little Golden Book Land - recording assistant (1989)
- Captain Planet and the Planeteers – writer (1 episode), recording assistant (1990–1991)
- Swamp Thing – writer (4 episodes) (1991)
- Goof Troop - writer (3 episodes) (1992)
- The Return of Jafar - story (1994)
- Aladdin: The Series - story editor (1994)
- Aladdin and the King of Thieves - screenplay (1996)
- Great Minds Think 4 Themselves - writer (1997)
- The Lion King 2: Simba's Pride – additional written material (1998)
- Disney's Hercules - writer (1 episode), producer (1998-1999)
- Buzz Lightyear of Star Command: The Adventure Begins - screenwriter, producer (2000)
- Buzz Lightyear of Star Command - writer, producer (2000-2001)
- Kim Possible - co-creator, executive producer, writer (5 episodes), lyrics (1 episode) (2002-2007)
- Kim Possible: A Sitch in Time - executive producer (2003)
- Kim Possible Movie: So the Drama - screenwriter, executive producer, story editor (2005)
- Sky High - screenwriter (2005)
- Jasmine's Enchanted Tales: Journey of a Princess (2005)
- Enchanted - uncredited rewrite (2007)
- Hotel for Dogs - screenwriter (2009)
- The Penguins of Madagascar - writer (7 episodes), executive producer (2009-2015)
- Monsters vs. Aliens - writer, executive producer (2013-2014)
- Tinker Bell and the Legend of the NeverBeast - screenplay (2014)
- All Hail King Julien - executive consultant: season 1 (2014)
- Big Hero 6: The Series - co-developer, writer (3 episodes), executive producer (2017–2021)
- Kim Possible - writer, executive producer, based on TV series (2019)
