= Steve Loter =

American animator

- Born: Steven Loter; Brooklyn, New York, U.S.
- Occupations: Animator, storyboard artist, producer, director
- Years active: 1993–present
- Children: 2

Steven Loter is an American animator, storyboard artist, director, and producer. His work includes several well-known Disney projects, such as Kim Possible, Tinker Bell and the Legend of the NeverBeast, and the development of Moon Girl and Devil Dinosaur.

== Early life and education ==
Loter was born and raised in New York City and moved to Los Angeles.

As a child, he used to watch Looney Tunes shorts and "a very poorly subtitled" bootleg of My Neighbor Totoro, which he credited as inspirations for his work on animation. He also cited Lilo & Stitch as a personal inspiration.

== Career ==
Loter's earliest works were as a character designer for Disney Consumer Products and at Jim Henson Productions. He started his work as a director directing episodes of The Ren & Stimpy Show, where he learned from the team about helming an animated production. He later worked as a director and producer on Kim Possible starting on season 2, as well as on Brandy & Mr. Whiskers and American Dragon: Jake Long. Loter also directed the Happy Monster Band, Buzz Lightyear of Star Command, and Disney's The Legend of Tarzan series, as well as episodes of Duckman and Stressed Eric. In 2001, he was hired as an additional director for Kevin Smith's Clerks The Animated Series. Loter was hired due to fellow directors Chris Bailey and Nick Fillipi being too busy with their episodes to focus on episodes 4 and 6, which he ended up directing. Loter applied his experience on Ren & Stimpy and Duckman for his work on the show.

In 2008, he directed a music video for the song "Hidden in the Sand", for the indie rock band Tally Hall. He was also an animation director for The Penguins of Madagascar, which won a Primetime Emmy Award in 2012 for Outstanding Animated Program.

Loter announced he was directing the feature film Tinker Bell and the Legend of the NeverBeast from DisneyToon Studios, at the D23 Expo on August 9, 2013. The film is from the Tinker Bell film series and is executive produced by John Lasseter. It was released direct-to-video on March 3, 2015. Loter, who was approached by Lasseter to pitch a Tinker Bell film, drew inspiration for the film's story on his daughter's love for animals and his own experiences as a father. He worked with the production teams for Secret of the Wings and The Pirate Fairy to ensure continuity within the films.

From 2021 to 2024, Loter worked as an executive-producer on The Ghost and Molly McGee, having joined the series due to long time collaborators Bill Roth and Bob Motz serving as showrunners. Loter also served as showrunner and an executive producer on Moon Girl and Devil Dinosaur, based on the comic book characters of the same name, which aired from to 2025. Loter was contacted by Laurence Fishburne to serve as an executive-producer on the series due to his work on Kim Possible. Having been a fan of Marvel comics since childhood and excited at the idea of working with Fishburne, Loter accepted. Loter and the team pitched the series to Disney with a roller-skating sequence featuring Childish Gambino's "Sweatpants", which was approved by Disney. He approached musician Raphael Saadiq to compose the score and provide songs for the series, being a fan of his; the two were previously set to collaborate on the cancelled Cars spin-off film Metro.

== Personal life ==
Loter is married, and has a daughter and a son.

Loter is a fan of anime, particularly Cowboy Bebop, and often references it in his animation work, something he described as "one of the things [he's] known for". He is a fan of Marvel Comics, and noted some Inhumans to be among his favorite characters.

== Filmography ==
=== Films ===
Year	Film	Credited as			
Year	Film	Director	Producer	Writer	Notes
2002	Tarzan & Jane	Yes	Yes	No	Direct-to-video film
2003	Kim Possible: A Sitch in Time	Yes	No	No	Television film
2005	Kim Possible: So the Drama	Yes	Yes	No	Television film
2015	Tinker Bell and the Legend of the Neverbeast	Yes	No	Story	Direct-to-video film

=== Television ===
Year	Title	Credited as				Notes
Year	Title	Director	Producer	Storyboard artist	Animation department	Notes
1993–1995	The Ren & Stimpy Show	Yes	No	Yes (1 episode)	Yes	Layout supervisor
1994–1997	Duckman	Yes	No	No	Yes	Retake supervisor (episode: "Das Dub")
1994–1995	The Baby Huey Show	Yes	No	No	No	
1998–2000	Stressed Eric	Yes	No	Yes	No	
1998–2004	Rocket Power	Yes	No	No	No	Unaired pilot only
2000–2002	Clerks: The Animated Series	Yes	No	No	No	
2001–2002	Buzz Lightyear of Star Command	Yes	No	No	No	
2001–2003	The Legend of Tarzan	Yes	Yes	No	No	
2002–2007	Kim Possible	Yes	Yes	No	No	
2006	Brandy & Mr. Whiskers	Yes	No	No	No	
2006–2007	American Dragon: Jake Long	Yes	No	No	No	
2008–2015	The Penguins of Madagascar	Animation	No	Yes	No	
2021–2024	The Ghost and Molly McGee	No	Executive	No	No	
2023–2025	Moon Girl and Devil Dinosaur	No	Executive	No	No	Also developer and showrunner
TBA	Journey	No	Executive	No	No	

== Nominations and awards ==
Year	Award	Category	Nominee	Result	Ref
2002	29th Daytime Emmy Awards	Outstanding Special Class Animated Program	The Legend of Tarzan	Nominated	
2005	32nd Daytime Emmy Awards	Outstanding Children's Animated Program	Kim Possible	Nominated	
2008	35th Annie Awards	Best Animated Television Production	Kim Possible	Nominated	
2012	39th Annie Awards	Directing in a Television Production	The Penguins of Madagascar	Nominated	
2012	Daytime Emmy Awards	Outstanding Directing in an Animated Program	The Penguins of Madagascar	Won	
2012	Primetime Emmy Awards	Outstanding Animated Program	The Penguins of Madagascar (episode: "The Return of the Revenge of Dr. Blowhole")	Won	
2022	Children's and Family Emmy Awards	Outstanding Main Title and Graphics	The Ghost and Molly McGee	Nominated	
2023	TCA Awards	Outstanding Achievement in Family Programming	Moon Girl and Devil Dinosaur	Nominated	
2023	Children's and Family Emmy Awards	Outstanding Children's or Young Teen Animated Series	Moon Girl and Devil Dinosaur	Nominated	
2023	Children's and Family Emmy Awards	Outstanding Animated Special	Moon Girl and Devil Dinosaur	Won	
2024	GLAAD Media Award	Outstanding Kids & Family Programming or Film – Animated	Moon Girl and Devil Dinosaur	Nominated	
2025	Children's and Family Emmy Awards	Outstanding Children's or Young Teen Animated Series	Moon Girl and Devil Dinosaur	Won	
