= Bob Schooley =

American screenwriter and producer

- Born: Robert Schooley; United States
- Occupations: Screenwriter, television writer, film and television producer
- Years active: 1983-present
- Known for: Co-creating Kim Possible Co-writing 7 episodes of "The New Kids on the Block"

Robert Schooley is an American screenwriter, television writer, and film and television producer. He and Mark McCorkle are the creators of the 2002 animated television series Kim Possible, which aired on Disney Channel. He was also an executive producer of the series, as well as having written scripts for several episodes. He has worked on several DreamWorks Animation shows, including The Penguins of Madagascar, Monsters vs. Aliens, and All Hail King Julien. He also wrote a book called "Liar of Kudzu" with McCorkle. He comes from Levittown, Pennsylvania. From 2017 to 2021, he and McCorkle produced Big Hero 6: The Series, which aired on Disney XD and Disney Channel.

He has written screenplays for films like Aladdin: The Return of Jafar, Aladdin and the King of Thieves, The Lion King II: Simba's Pride, Buzz Lightyear of Star Command: The Adventure Begins, Sky High and Hotel for Dogs.

== Selected filmography ==
- Maxie's World – recording assistant (1987)
- The Real Ghostbusters – writer (1 episode), recording assistant (1988–1990)
- ALF Tales – recording assistant (1988)
- A.L.F. – recording assistant (1988–1989)
- C.O.P.S. – writer (2 episodes), recording assistant (1988–1989)
- The New Adventures of Beany and Cecil – recording assistant (1988)
- G.I. Joe: Operation Dragonfire (1989)
- Captain N: The Game Master – recording assistant (1989)
- Teenage Mutant Ninja Turtles – writer (1 episode) (1989)
- The Karate Kid – recording assistant (1989)
- Camp Candy – recording assistant (1989)
- New Kids on the Block – writer (7 episodes) (1989)
- The Super Mario Bros. Super Show! – writer (5 episodes), recording assistant (1989)
- Little Golden Book Land – recording assistant (1989)
- Captain Planet and the Planeteers – writer (1 episode), recording assistant (1990–1991)
- Swamp Thing – writer (4 episodes) (1991)
- Goof Troop – writer (3 episodes) (1992)
- The Return of Jafar – story (1994)
- Aladdin: The Series – story editor (1994)
- Aladdin and the King of Thieves – screenplay (1996)
- Great Minds Think 4 Themselves – writer (1997)
- The Lion King 2: Simba's Pride – additional written material (1998)
- Disney's Hercules – writer (1 episode), producer (1998–1999)
- Buzz Lightyear of Star Command: The Adventure Begins – screenwriter, producer (2000)
- Buzz Lightyear of Star Command – writer, producer (2000–2001)
- Kim Possible – co-creator, executive producer, writer (5 episodes), lyrics (1 episode) (2002–2007)
- Kim Possible: A Sitch in Time – executive producer (2003)
- Kim Possible Movie: So the Drama – screenwriter, executive producer, story editor (2005)
- Sky High – screenwriter (2005)
- Enchanted – uncredited rewrite (2007)
- Hotel for Dogs – screenplay (2009)
- The Penguins of Madagascar – writer (7 episodes), executive producer (2009–2015)
- Monsters vs. Aliens – writer (1 episode), executive producer (2013–2014)
- Tinker Bell and the Legend of the NeverBeast – screenplay (2014)
- All Hail King Julien – executive consultant: season 1 (2014)
- Big Hero 6: The Series – co-developer, writer (3 episodes), executive producer (2017–2021)
- Kim Possible – screenwriter, executive producer, based on TV series (2019)
