= Kim Possible (disambiguation) =

Kim Possible is an American animated television series on Disney Channel.

Kim Possible may also refer to:

- Kim Possible (character), the title character of the television series
- Kim Possible (film), a live-action television film based on the television series
- Kim Possible (video game series), a series of video games based on the television series
- Kim Possible (soundtrack), the soundtrack to the television series
