= Go Team =

Go Team may refer to:

== Teams ==
- Go team, a unit of the USA's National Transportation Safety Board that investigates transport accidents
- 1958 LSU Tigers football team Go(ld) Team

== Music ==
- The Go! Team, an English band
- The Go Team, a 1980s band from Olympia, Washington

== See also ==
- Team Go
- "Go Team Go", an episode of the Disney Channel series Kim Possible
