= Big Bother =

Big Bother may refer to:

- "Big Bother" (Kim Possible), a 2007 television episode
- "Big Bother" (My Hero), a 2005 television episode
