= Kim Possible (video game series) =

Video game series

Kim Possible video games are a series of action platformer games based on Disney's animated television series Kim Possible. They were mostly released for the Game Boy Advance (GBA) and Nintendo DS; the game Disney's Kim Possible: What's the Switch? was released for the PlayStation 2.

Kim Possible: Revenge of Monkey Fist, the first game in the series, was developed by Digital Eclipse and published by Disney Interactive. Every game afterward was released by the same publisher, but developed by Artificial Mind and Movement.

== Overview ==
Year	Title	Developer(s)	Publisher(s)	Platform(s)	Ref.
2002	Kim Possible: Revenge of Monkey Fist	Digital Eclipse	Disney Interactive, THQ (Note: Distributed by THQ outside of the United States.)	Game Boy Advance	
2004	Kim Possible 2: Drakken's Demise	Artificial Mind and Movement	Disney Interactive	Game Boy Advance	
2005	Kim Possible 3: Team Possible	Artificial Mind and Movement	Disney Interactive	Game Boy Advance	
2005	Kim Possible: Kimmunicator	Artificial Mind and Movement	Buena Vista Games (Note: Published as Buena Vista Games outside of the United States and Japan. Distributed by D3 Publisher in Japan.)	Nintendo DS	
2006	Kim Possible: Legend of the Monkeys Eye	Digital Eclipse	Buena Vista Games	Windows / macOS	
2006	Kim Possible: What's the Switch?	Artificial Mind and Movement	Buena Vista Games	PlayStation 2	
2007	Kim Possible: Global Gemini	Artificial Mind and Movement	Disney Interactive Studios	Nintendo DS	
2007	Kim Possible	Reakosys, Inc.	Disney Mobile	Java ME	

== Games ==
=== Game Boy Advance ===
Kim Possible: Revenge of Monkey Fist was released for the GBA on November 13, 2002 in North America and November 21, 2003 in Europe. Doctor Drakken and Monkey Fist have kidnapped Ron, forcing Kim to locate Doctor Drakken's secret headquarters and rescue Ron. The game places the player in the role of Kim. The Bebes and Gill are also enemies in the game.

Disney's Kim Possible 2: Drakken's Demise (titled Disney's Kim Possible in Japan) was released for the GBA on September 15, 2004 in North America, July 21, 2005 in Japan, and March 10, 2006 in Europe. The game was developed by Artificial Mind and Movement and published by Disney Interactive. The game places the player in the role of Kim to defeat Doctor Drakken, Shego, Duff Killigan, Falsetto Jones, and Gemini. Drakken's Demise is divided into four "episodes", most of which are sequels to episodes in the show's second season. In the first episode, True or Falsetto?, Falsetto Jones breaks out of prison and stages a theft to get revenge on Kim Possible for foiling his previous crime in Rufus in Show. In Altitude Attitude, Duff Killigan steals a weather machine and hides it in the mountains. Fortunately, he forgot to steal the instructions, too. This is similar to the TV episode Job Unfair, but also has the "Killer Snowmen" from Day of the Snowmen.

In The Rufus Factor, Ron asks Kim to help him find Rufus, who has been kidnapped by Gemini. This is a reference to the "Rufus Factor" epilogue in The Ron Factor. In the last episode, Day of the Destructo-Bots, Drakken finishes his destructo-bots from Car Trouble and sends them on a rampage through Middleton. Kim has to stop them before her date with Josh Mankey. Naturally, Drakken doesn't make it easy, and neither does Shego, whom Kim must fight as well.

Disney's Kim Possible 3: Team Possible was released for the GBA on August 21, 2005 exclusively in North America. Kim and Ron have teamed up to form Team Possible to defeat Doctor Drakken, Shego, and other super villains. The game places the player in the role of Kim or Ron. Kim Possible 3 is the first game where Ron Stoppable is a playable character. Throughout the game, both characters must work together to advance through the game, as Kim may not be able to reach an area that Ron can. The game can be played with two players over a link cable connection; if this is not available, the player can toggle each character. The other character has no AI and will not move when the player is not controlling him or her.

=== PlayStation 2 ===
Disney's Kim Possible: What's the Switch? was released in North America on October 19, 2006 and in Europe on November 17. It is the first Kim Possible game to appear on a home console, as all the other Kim Possible games were designed for hand-held systems. The subtitle is a pun on one of Kim's catchphrases. It is also the first to feature voice acting, all the actors voice their characters. In December 2006, the game was featured as a demo on the Official PlayStation Magazine's demo disc issue #111. Both Kim and Shego are playable characters. In each level, control is relayed between the two of them as they chase Dementor and Monkey Fist around the world. Rufus is also playable at certain points in the game, but only when playing with Kim.

Teen heroine Kim Possible and sidekick Ron Stoppable arrive at Monkey Fist's castle to stop Dr. Drakken and Shego from stealing the Mystical Monkey Idol. However, when the two teams fight over the Idol, Ron and Drakken get their minds switched with each other's bodies. Before Kim or Shego can do anything, Professor Dementor appears and steals the Idol himself. Realizing that she needs the Idol to switch Ron and Drakken back to normal, Kim takes off in pursuit, unaware that Shego is also on the trail. As a result, the two girls' paths cross continuously, ultimately forcing the two rivals to team up and stop Dementor, who has partnered with Monkey Fist in an all-new scheme. The game was met with generally favorable reception.

=== Nintendo DS ===
Disney's Kim Possible: Kimmunicator was released for the Nintendo DS on November 9, 2005 in North America and March 10, 2006 in Europe. After Doctor Drakken kidnaps Wade, Kim needs the player's help to rescue Wade and stop Drakken's plan to build yet another Doomsday Device. The game places the player in the role of Wade's replacement.

Disney's Kim Possible: Global Gemini was released for the Nintendo DS worldwide in February 2007. It is the last Kim Possible video game. Both Kim and Ron are playable characters. Whereas Kim is more capable of physical movement and direct combat, Ron is more gadget-oriented. Kim Possible and her faithful sidekick Ron Stoppable have been summoned by the world protection group Global Justice to rescue their leader, Dr. Director, who is currently being held hostage by her archenemy (and twin brother) Sheldon, alias Gemini. Team Possible sets off to stop Gemini's evil secret organization, the Worldwide Evil Empire (WEE), as well as deal with Motor Ed and Adrena Lynn, both of whom have been broken out of prison by Gemini to aid in his grand plan.

=== PC ===
Disney's Kim Possible: Legend of the Monkey's Eye was released for the PC on May 16, 2006. Monkey Fist has discovered the most potent mystic monkey power of all the Monkey's Eye. With the force of the Monkey's Eye, Monkey Fist is plotting to create an evil ape empire by transforming every human into a monkey. Players control Kim, in battles against the evil villain, Monkey Fist, including three boss battles. Players must defeat Monkey Fist and save the world. Players kick, punch, and jump their way through six different levels battling Monkey Ninjas and Mecha-Monkeys in three unique locations to crush Monkey Fist's attempt at world domination. Players power-up by picking up teleporter mini-cells, static shields, Bueno Nacho Tacos, and teleporter power cores to gain strength over enemies and secure access to new areas. The goal is to defeat Monkey Fist and steal back the Monkey's Eye to save mankind.

=== Java ME ===
Disney's Kim Possible was released for the Java ME phones in 2007. Kim's dad has been kidnapped by the evil Drakken, who's holed up with his victim at the top of his tower HQ. It's up to young Kim, with only the assistance of Rufus, her naked mole rat of a sidekick, to rescue her father and end Drakken's nefarious scheme. Gameplay consists of puzzle, where player should got to take the stairs up all 50 floors and make his way across the colour-changing floors.

== Reception ==
The Academy of Interactive Arts & Sciences nominated Kim Possible: What's the Switch for "Children's Game of the Year" at the 10th Annual Interactive Achievement Awards.

By November 2006, the series sold more than 1 million units.

Aggregate review scores
Game	GameRankings	Metacritic
Disney's Kim Possible: Revenge of Monkey Fist	61%	62/100
Disney's Kim Possible 2: Drakken's Demise	77%	77/100
Disney's Kim Possible 3: Team Possible	79%	76/100
Disney's Kim Possible: Kimmunicator	62%	61/100
Disney's Kim Possible: What's the Switch?	76%	76/100
Disney's Kim Possible: Global Gemini	74%	70/100
