= Kim Possible: Revenge of Monkey Fist =

2002 video game

- North America cover art
- Developer: Digital Eclipse
- Publisher: Disney Interactive (Note: The European release was co-published by THQ.)
- Director: Mike Mika
- Producers: Michael Bilodeau; William Baffy; Chris Charla; Andrew Ayre; Jeff Vavasour
- Designers: Micah Russo; Joe Cain
- Programmer: Bryan Sawler
- Artists: Boyd Burggrabe; Dean Lee; Arvin Bautista; Kevin James; Antony Mazzotta; Luc Verhulst; Pete Ward
- Composer: Robert Baffy
- Platform: Game Boy Advance
- Release: NA: November 13, 2002; EU: November 21, 2003
- Genre: Platform
- Mode: Single-player

Kim Possible: Revenge of Monkey Fist is a 2002 Platform game developed by Digital Eclipse published by Disney Interactive for the Game Boy Advance. It is based on the animated television series of the same name. The game received mixed reviews from critics. While they praised graphics and music's faithfulness to the show, they criticized its controls and password save system.

== Gameplay ==
An example of gameplay in Kim Possible: Revenge of Monkey Fist

Kim Possible: Revenge of Monkey Fist is a side-scrolling platformer. In which the player controls Kim Possible to rescue Ron Stoppable, and defeat Dr. Drakken, Shego and Monkey Fist. The game consists of eight levels. The player can jump, attack, wall jump and perform cartwheels.

The player can use gadgets found through the levels for a short period of time for combat against enemies or navigation. It includes a hair dryer grappling gun that lets player access higher areas, a lipstick laser that shoots projectiles, and a throwable compact bomb that can break obstacles such as walls, while a force field provides invincibility. The game features a password save system, represented by the portraits of characters from the show.

== Plot ==
The series villains Dr. Drakken, Shego and Monkey Fist, team up. In plot of world domination; they purchase hundreds of Drakken's Henchmen and Monkey Ninjas army via credit card. They abduct Ron Stoppable in their plan for using him as a guinea pig, to their crystal-powered "super-secret weapon of destruction".

== Development and release ==
Kim Possible: Revenge of Monkey Fist, based on the animated television series of the same name, was developed by Digital Eclipse and published by Disney Interactive. It was released in North America on November 13, 2002, and was co-published in Europe by THQ, on November 21, 2003.

== Reception ==
Reception

Aggregate score
Aggregator	Score
Metacritic	62/100

Review scores
Publication	Score
GameZone	7/10
IGN	5/10
Nintendo Power	3.2/5

Kim Possible: Revenge of Monkey Fist received "mixed or average" reviews according to review aggregator Metacritic. Crtics praised the game's graphics and music's fidelity to the show, but they criticized controls and password save system.

Many reviewers had mixed opinions towards its controls. While critics found them genearally either "tight", or "work well", they noted difficulties in reaching higher areas.

The password save system was criticized by reviewers. Anise Hollingshead of GameZone called it "very annoying". She felt that the absence of text under the character portraits would to be difficult to execute password combinations for the players unfamiliar with the show. "Nix" of IGN commented that in place of the password system, the battery back-up save system should be used instead.
