= Stephen Silver =

British-born American artist, cartoonist and character designer (born 1972)

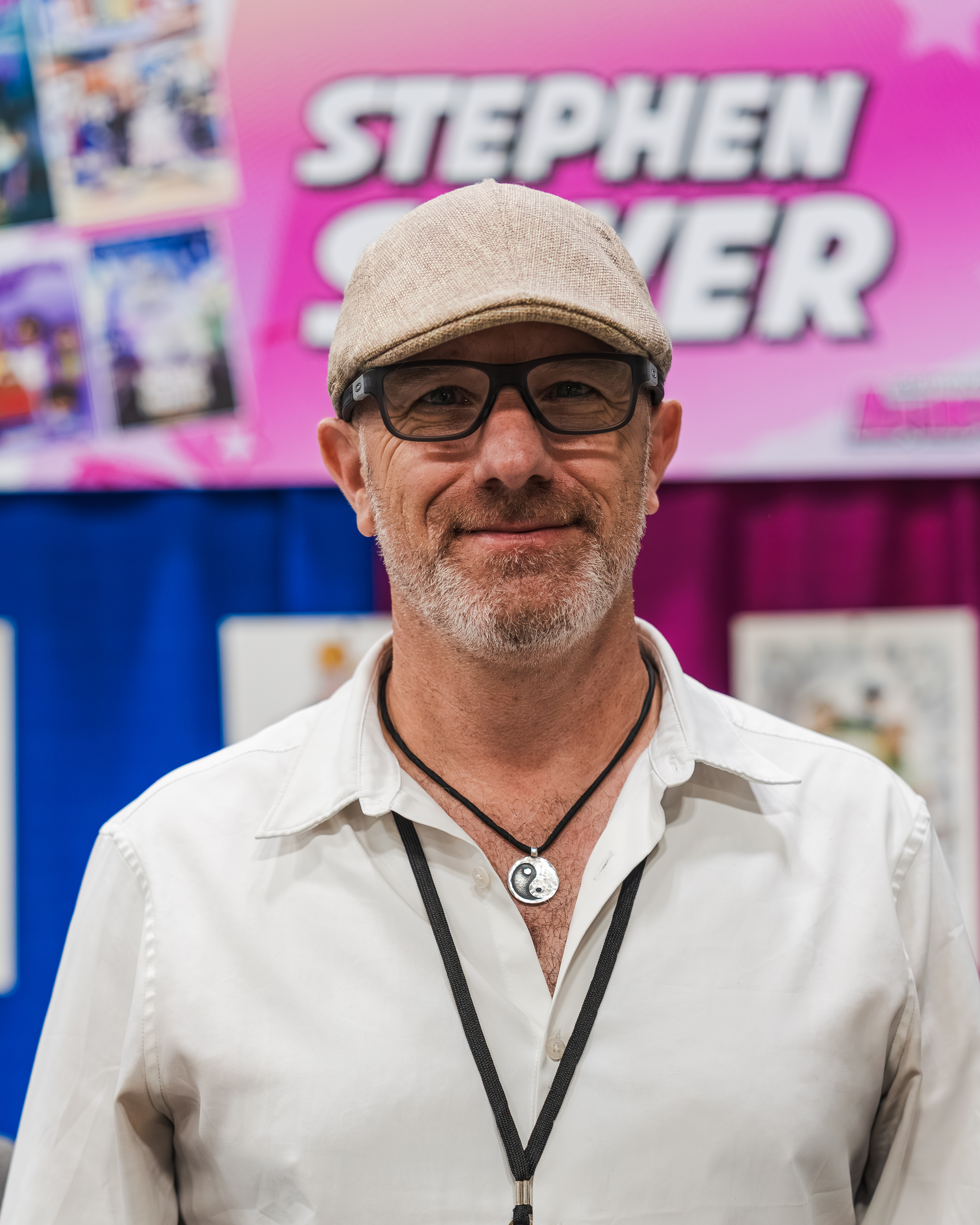
- Silver at Animate! Columbus in 2026
- Born: London, England
- Occupations: Artist, cartoonist, character designer, actor
- Years active: 1987–present
- Known for: Kim Possible; Danny Phantom

Stephen Silver is a British-born American artist, cartoonist and character designer. He is best known as the lead character designer for animated series such as Clerks: The Animated Series (2000), Kim Possible (2002–2007) and Danny Phantom (2004–2007).

== History ==
Silver started his professional career by drawing caricatures at amusement parks in 1992. He worked for clothing company No Fear in 1996, before he got his first job in animation at Warner Bros. Animation in 1997.

== Animated works ==
In the field of animation, Silver is the lead character designer on Disney Channel's Kim Possible, ABC's Clerks: The Animated Series, and Nickelodeon's Danny Phantom (on which he was also art director).

His character designs for the characters of Clerks: The Animated Series inspired the animated versions of characters in the other View Askew films.

He also worked on Nickelodeon's The Fairly OddParents as the lead character designer for the Crash Nebula episode special, and some character designs for the movie Channel Chasers. His early work in animation included designing characters for Histeria.

== Portfolio ==
Year	Title	Role	Notes
1988	Night of the Kickfighters	Actor: Imam	
1998–2000	Histeria!	Model designer, prop designer, storyboard artist, background painter, background designer, character designer	
2000	Clerks: The Animated Series	Leading character designer	
2000–2004	The Weekenders	Character designer	
2002–2007	Kim Possible	Character designer	
2002–2016	The Fairly OddParents	Prop designer, production designer, storyboard revisionist, character designer	
2003	Kim Possible: A Sitch in Time	Character designer	TV movie
2003	The Golden Age of Texas Courthouse	Editor	
2004–2007	Danny Phantom	Lead character designer	
2005	Kim Possible Movie: So the Drama	Character designer	TV movie
2008	July M.D.: Super Surgeon	Character designer	Short
2008	Sean	Character designer	Short
2008	Leafy	Character designer	Short
2008	Lady D	Character designer	Short
2008	Georgy	Character designer	Short
2008	Click and Clack's As the Wrench Turns	Character designer	1 episode
2008	The Replacements	Character designer	2 episodes
2008–2010	The Penguins of Madagascar	Character designer	9 episodes
2009	Cloudy with a Chance of Meatballs	Character designer	Video game
2009–2010	The Cleveland Show	Character designer	12 episodes
2010	Kick Buttowski: Suburban Daredevil	Character designer	1 episode
2010–2011	Scooby-Doo! Mystery Incorporated	Character designer	10 episodes
2011	The Looney Tunes Show	Storyboard clean-up artist	10 episodes
2015–2016	Be Cool, Scooby-Doo!	Character clean-up	7 episodes
2016	Norm of the North	Character designer	
2021	Johnny Test	Character designer	Revival of the 2005 animated series of the same name
