= Connie Ray =

American actress and playwright

- Occupations: Actress, playwright
- Years active: 1991–present

Connie Ray is an American actress and playwright. Among her highest-profile appearances are Thank You for Smoking (2006) and Stuart Little (1999), and the television drama ER (1997). She also appeared in Ice Princess (2005) and on George Lopez (2002).

== Biography ==
Connie Ray was one of three children born to Shelton Ray and raised on the family's dairy farm in Orange County, North Carolina. At the age of ten, Ray wrote a play with her brother Lester for a 4-H club talent show that went on to win at county and district competitions. She went on to study dance at East Carolina University and earned a Master of Fine Arts at Ohio University.

Ray wrote the bluegrass gospel musicals Smoke On The Mountain, which opened off-Broadway in 1990, Sanders Family Christmas (1999), and Smoke on the Mountain Homecoming (2006), three of the most produced musicals in the United States for the last 20 years.

== Filmography ==
=== Film ===
Year	Title	Role	Notes
1996	A Very Brady Sequel	Flight Attendant	
1996	Space Jam	Owner's Girlfriend	
1996	My Fellow Americans	Genny	
1997	Speed 2: Cruise Control	Fran Fisher	
1998	Hope Floats	Bobbi-Claire Patterson	
1999	Idle Hands	Mrs. Tobias	
1999	Stuart Little	Aunt Tina	
2000	Lost Souls	Mother	
2002	The Time Machine	Teacher	
2002	About Schmidt	Vicki Rusk	
2003	How to Deal	Marion Smith	
2004	Bobby Jones: Stroke of Genius	Clara Jones	
2005	Ice Princess	Mrs. Fletcher	
2005	Thank You for Smoking	Pearl	
2006	Flourish	Wendy Covner	
2006	Flags of Our Fathers	Mrs. Sousley	
2007	Welcome to Paradise	Patsy Nellis	
2022	American Reject	Bonnie	

=== Television ===
Year	Title	Role	Notes
1991	Harry and the Hendersons	Ginger Higgs	Episode: "Harry Goes Ape"
1991–1993	The Torkelsons/Almost Home	Millicent Torkelson	Main role
1992	Quantum Leap	Carol Pruitt	Episode: "Killin' Time"
1993	L.A. Law	Philomena Bannister	Episode: "Leap of Faith"
1995	Murphy Brown	Ms. Howard	Episode: "Murphy's Law"
1995	Never Say Never: The Deirdre Hall Story	Shane	TV movie
1996	Coach	Mary Luba	Episode: "Nice Guys Get Cut"
1996	Dream On	Mandy	Episode: "Second Time Aground"
1997	Touched by an Angel	Sandra Mills	Episode: "The Road Home: Part 1"
1997	Promised Land	Sandra Mills	Episode: "The Road Home: Part 2"
1997	ER	Glenda	Episode: "Friendly Fire"
1998	The Pretender	Episode: "Red Rock Jarod"	Marilyn Miller
1999	Veronica's Closet	Jan Schaefer	Episode: "Veronica's Big Homecoming"
1999	It's Like, You Know...	Beverly	Episode: "Two Days in the Valley"
2000	Zoe, Duncan, Jack and Jane	Betty	Episode: "The Feud"
2002	Andy Richter Controls the Universe	Lorie	Episode: "Wedding"
2002	Providence	Hazel	Episodes: "All the King's Men", "Gotcha", "Out of Control"
2002	George Lopez	Debbie	Episode: "No Free Launch"
2003	Less than Perfect	Nona	Episode: "High Maintenance"
2005–2006	Still Standing	Joy	Episodes: "Still Bill Vol. 1", "Still Deceitful"
2006	Twenty Good Years	Susan	Episode: "John's Old Lady"
2007	My Name Is Earl	Mrs. Clevenger	Episode: "Burn Victim"
2008	Greek	Norma	Episode: "47 Hours and 11 Minutes"
2008	Worst Week	Sheila	Episodes: "The Cake", "The Wedding"
2011	Justified	Mrs. Reasoner	Episode: "Blaze of Glory"
2011	Law & Order: Special Victims Unit	Biological Mother	Episode; "Double Strands"
2011–2013	The Big C	Connie Schuler	Episodes: "The Little c", "What's Your Story?", "Quality of Life", "The Finale"
2012	Hart of Dixie	Mrs. Beaudry	Episode: "Walkin' After Midnight"
2013 & 2017	Blue Bloods	Ruth / Ann Harris	Episodes: "Lost and Found" & "Ghosts of the Past"
2014–2015	Grey's Anatomy	Karen Kepner	Episodes: "Don't Let's Start" & "The Bed's Too Big Without You"
2017	The Marvelous Mrs. Maisel	Mrs. Winters	Episode: "Mrs. X at the Gaslight"
2017	Kick Me, I'm Christian	Betsy Rafferty	Unsold TV pilot
2018	The Good Fight	Mrs. Honeycutt	Episode: "Day 443"
2019	Kim Possible	Nana Possible	TV movie

=== Theater ===
Year	Title	Role	Theater
1988	The Heidi Chronicles		
1990	Smoke on the Mountain	June Sanders	Lamb's Theatre
2010	Next Fall	Arlene	Helen Hayes Theatre
2013	Hands on a Hardbody	Cindy Barnes	Brooks Atkinson Theatre
