= Sadie Stanley =

American actress (born 2001)

- Born: November 15, 2001 (age 24); Columbia, South Carolina, U.S.
- Occupations: Actress; singer
- Years active: 2018–present

Sadie Anne Stanley (born November 15, 2001) is an American actress and singer. She made her acting debut as Kim Possible in the Disney Channel film Kim Possible (2019). Her films since include The Sleepover (2020), Let Us In (2021) and Karate Kid: Legends (2025). On television, she is known for her roles in the ABC sitcom The Goldbergs (2020–2023) and the Freeform thriller anthology Cruel Summer (2023).

== Early life ==
Stanley was born on November 15, 2001, in Columbia, South Carolina, to Tracy and Matt Stanley. She has a twin sister, Sophie. Stanley became interested in acting when she was 13 in 2015. She was an actor for Columbia Children’s Theatre. One of her notable performances was as Young Princess Fiona in Shrek.

== Career ==
Stanley sang an updated version of the Kim Possible theme song "Call Me, Beep Me!" for the live-action movie, in which she also played the titular character. To prepare for her role as Kim Possible, she underwent extensive training in martial arts, and as a result, she was able to do her own stunts and fight sequences, for which she was highly praised. Stanley has also appeared in several shows, including Game Shakers and The Goldbergs. Since 2020, Stanley has appeared on ABC sitcom The Goldbergs as Brea Bee, love interest and girlfriend of the show's main character, Adam Goldberg (played by her Kim Possible co-star Sean Giambrone). She played Parker, girlfriend of Jen's (played by Christina Applegate) oldest son, Charlie, on the second season of Netflix's Dead to Me.

== Personal life ==
As of 2024, Sadie is in a relationship with a graphic designer named Kianah Rene; they frequently post about their relationship on Instagram, including on Valentine's Day.

== Filmography ==
=== Film ===
Year	Title	Role	Notes
2020	The Sleepover	Clancy Finch	
2021	Let Us In	Jessie	
2021	Well-Behaved Women	Alyssa Pierce	
2022	Somewhere in Queens	Dani Brooks	
2025	Karate Kid: Legends	Mia Lipani	
2026	Pretty Babies	TBA	

=== Television ===
Year	Title	Role	Notes
2019	Kim Possible	Kim Possible	Disney Channel Original Movie
2019	Kim Hushable	Kim Possible	Web series; main role
2019	Game Shakers	Giggling girl #1	Episode: "Bug Tussle"
2019	Coop & Cami Ask the World	Tracey Kruger	Episode: "Would You Wrather Just Dance?"
2020–2023	The Goldbergs	Brea Bee	Recurring role (season 7–9); guest (season 10); 36 episodes
2020	Dead to Me	Parker	3 episodes
2020	Room 104	Jules	Episode: "Oh, Harry!"
2021	PEN15	Jenny	Voice role; Episode: "Jacuzzi"
2021	Robot Chicken	Blossom / Peggy Carter / Carol	Voice role; Episode: "May Cause a Squeakquel"
2023	Cruel Summer	Megan Landry	Main role (season 2)
2025	Criminal Minds	Tia Ryder	Episode: "The Zookeeper"
