= List of Kim Possible episodes =

The following is a list of episodes for the Disney Channel series Kim Possible, which aired from June 7, 2002 to September 7, 2007. A total of four seasons, 87 episodes, and three TV movies were produced.

Since the episodes are shown according to their air dates, and not the order in which they were produced, which usually shows the chronology of the episodes, some continuity errors are presented throughout the series, mainly during the first season. With the exception of the So the Drama episodes and some season 3 episodes, the series' production order most closely reflects the intended chronological episode order.

== Series overview ==
Season	Episodes	Originally released	
Season	Episodes	First released	Last released
1	21	June 7, 2002	May 16, 2003
2	30 (Note: 33 segments; episodes 6, 12 and 25 all contain two 11 minute segments; "Rufus in Show / Adventures in Rufus-Sitting", "Rufus vs. Commodore Puddles / Day of the Snowmen" and "Sick Day / The Truth Hurts")	July 18, 2003	August 5, 2004
3	14 (Note: 15 segments; episode 7 contains two 11 minute segments; "Overdue / Roachie")	September 25, 2004	June 10, 2006
Crossover		August 26, 2005	
4	22 (Note: 23 segments; episode 19 contains two 11 minute segments; "Chasing Rufus / Nursery Crimes")	February 10, 2007	September 7, 2007

== Episodes ==
=== Season 1 (2002–03) ===
Note: All episodes in this season were directed by Chris Bailey.

No. overall	No. in season	Title	Written by	Storyboard by	Original release date	Prod. code
1	1	"Crush"	Bob Schooley & Mark McCorkle	Dave Bullock, Rossen Varbanov & Eugene Salandra	June 7, 2002	113
Kim tries to stop Dr. Drakken from using stolen Japanese game technology to build a giant robot. Fighting the bad guys, however, is nothing compared to asking her crush, Josh Mankey (Breckin Meyer), out to an upcoming school dance.
2	2	"Sink or Swim"	Julie DuFine & Amanda Rudolph Schwartz	Eugene Salandra, Holly Forsyth & Dave Bullock	June 7, 2002	111
On their way to a cheerleading competition, the Middleton Cheer squad gets stranded at an old camp with which Ron has a long and bad history. He faces Gill, an amphibious mutant who, when human, constantly picked on Ron, but who is now determined to get his revenge on him for inadvertently causing his transformation.
3	3	"The New Ron"	Mark Palmer	Eugene Salandra & Ed Baker	June 7, 2002	105
When Ron finds himself gaining attention with a haircut Kim convinced him to get, he attempts to transform his personality as well, but develops an unhealthy obsession with his hair. When he and Kim go to France to get more hair gel, Ron unwittingly inspires reclusive billionaire Señor Senior, Jr. to take up a life of crime, and now Kim and the newly changed Ron must save France from a blackout.
4	4	"Tick-Tick-Tick"	Bob Schooley & Mark McCorkle	Rossen Varbanov, Tom Bernardo, Nicholas Filippi, Adam Van Wyk & Louis M. Police	June 14, 2002	101
Kim has to fit both foiling Drakken's plan to use stolen nano-explosive technology and detention into her life after Ron inadvertently causes her to fail substitute teacher Mr. Barkin's "three strikes" tardy policy.: This is chronologically the premiere of the series.; This episode chronologically comes before Crush.
5	5	"Downhill"	Brian Swenlin	Troy Adomitis, Tom Bernardo & Chris Rutkowski	June 21, 2002	116
A school ski trip leads to "humiliation nation" when Bonnie manages to place Kim's parents as chaperones. As she struggles with her parents' presence, Kim also has to confront a rogue geneticist named DNAmy and her mutant monsters.
6	6	"Bueno Nacho"	Julie DuFine & Amanda Rudolph Schwartz	Dave Bullock, Louis M. Police, Tom Bernardo, Nicholas Filippi & Adam Van Wyk	June 28, 2002	102
Kim takes a job at Bueno Nacho to pay for a fashionable jacket, convincing the reluctant Ron to keep her company by applying for him too. As Ron's career kicks off and he becomes assistant manager, Drakken plots to destroy Wisconsin from inside a giant wheel of cheese, capturing Kim in the process. In order to save her, Ron must choose between his career or duty as sidekick.
7	7	"Number One"	Mark Palmer	Scott Morse, Tom Bernardo & Bob Kline	July 12, 2002	112
The international crime-fighting organization, Global Justice, pairs Kim with their snobby top agent to hunt down the kidnapper of a prominent scientist, revealed to be villainous Scottish golfer Duff Killigan. Sensing weakness, Bonnie uses the opportunity to make a play to replace Kim as cheer captain.
8	8	"Mind Games"	Marsha Griffin	Tom Bernardo & Adam Van Wyk	July 19, 2002	106
Drakken's latest scheme accidentally leads to Kim and Ron switching bodies. Kim gets a taste of what it is like to be the unpopular outcast while Ron finds out about life with the burden of actual responsibility.: This episode chronologically comes after "Attack of the Killer Bebes".
9	9	"Attack of the Killer Bebes"	Madellaine Paxson	Troy Adomitis & Eugene Salandra	August 2, 2002	104
Robots that are suspiciously similar to ones designed by Drew Lipsky (Dr. Drakken)—one of Dr. Possible's old college buddies—kidnap his friends one by one. Meanwhile, Ron joins the cheerleading squad as the mascot, much to Kim's chagrin.: This episode chronologically comes before "Mind Games".
10	10	"Royal Pain"	Madellaine Paxson	Eugene Salandra, Mike Manley & Chris Rutkowski	August 16, 2002	107
Kim allows the snobbish Prince of Rodeghan to hide out in Middleton for protection, and he winds up running against her in the school election, which is complicated by the arrival of an organization bent on overthrowing the Rodeghan monarchy.
11	11	"Coach Possible"	Laura McCreary	Stephen Sandoval & Holly Forsyth	August 23, 2002	117
After Dr. James Possible breaks his leg, Kim takes over coaching his soccer team, and drives the twins and the other players insane with her ultra-competitiveness. In between practice, she and Ron try to recover state-of-the-art animatronic animals and a neon-style gas from the thieving Seniors, one of whom is coming up with his own evil scheme for the very first time.
12	12	"Pain King vs. Cleopatra"	Patti Carr & Lara Runnels	Tom Bernardo & David Lux	September 6, 2002	118
Kim and Ron get tickets to the big match between hit wrestlers Pain King and Steel Toe. Ron, unable to get Kim excited about the event, fears that a new friend has come between them. However, a new challenger plans to crash the match with a magical amulet, given as a gift to Queen Cleopatra, imbuing him with the great supernatural powers of the spirit of Anubis.
13	13	"Monkey Fist Strikes"	Gary Sperling	Curt Geda, Troy Adomitis & Eugene Salandra	September 13, 2002	103
Kim and Ron help the adventurer Lord Monty Fiske retrieve a monkey statue, ostensibly to give to a museum. Fiske, however, uses it along with the rest of the set to transform into a fearsome kung fu master. When Kim is forced to visit her nerdy cousin Larry, it's all up to Ron to stop Monkey Fist.
14	14	"October 31st"	Mark Palmer	Tom Bernardo, Bob Kline & David Schwartz	October 11, 2002	121
While fighting Drakken, Shego, and Duff Killigan, Kim accidentally has a strange bracelet attached to her wrist. She discovers that the bracelet grows every time she lies, leading to embarrassment when she tries to get out of a series of engagements to attend a Halloween party with Josh Mankey.: This is chronologically the last episode of the season.
15	15	"All the News"	Laura McCreary	Dave Bullock, Rossen Varbanov & Tom Bernardo	November 1, 2002	110
Ron fudges a quote to turn it into a hot scoop, landing Kim into a forced date with Middleton High's dim-witted star quarterback Brick Flagg and giving himself a sweet spot on the school paper. His journalistic career runs into trouble, however, when he accuses TV daredevil Adrena Lynn of faking her stunts and she vows revenge.
16	16	"Kimitation Nation"	Kayte Kuch & Sheryl Scarborough	David Schwartz, Bob Kline & Nathan Chew	November 15, 2002	119
A designer copies Kim's mission outfit and turns it into the next fashion trend. While initially hopeful that the sudden popularity of her clothes would allow her to be accepted by seniors, Kim Style is eventually copied by all the girls and even some boys. Drakken, struck by this inspiration, tries to create an army of Kim Possible clones to destroy his teenage foe.
17	17	"The Twin Factor"	Mark Palmer	Dave Bullock & Eugene Salandra	December 27, 2002	108
Drakken steals mind-control technology which he intends to replicate to take over the world. When her parents leave on a retreat Kim is forced to take her twin brothers along to stop Drakken.
18	18	"Animal Attraction"	Robin Riordan & Gary Sperling	Curt Geda & Holly Forsyth	January 10, 2003	109
Kim falls for the latest craze sweeping Middleton High, Animology, which purports to predict personality and romantic compatibility. Along the way, she has to stop Señor Senior, Sr.'s scheme to destroy the billionaire's club he was kicked out of and also deal with Animology's prediction that Señor Senior, Jr. is her soulmate.
19	19	"Monkey Ninjas in Space"	Meg McLaughlin	Troy Adomitis, Chris Rutkowski, Lyndon Ruddy & Stephen Sandoval	March 7, 2003	114
Based upon the Monkey Monk's prediction, Monkey Fist kidnaps the world's smartest monkey and uses the Middleton space center to launch himself into space while Kim faces her dad's humiliating behavior, and Ron faces his fear of monkeys.
20	20	"Ron the Man"	Bob Schooley & Mark McCorkle	Holly Forsyth, Doug Murphy & Eugene Salandra	April 25, 2003	120
Ron is shocked to discover in front of Mr. Barkin's entire class that his rabbi never signed his bar mitzvah certificate. To prove his manhood, he wears a strength-enhancing ring created by Hench Co. Industries. Drakken, in the meantime, uses the other rings to attempt to steal an invention Professor Dementor has gotten to first.
21	21	"Low Budget"	Patti Carr & Lara Runnels	Holly Forsyth & Curt Geda	May 16, 2003	115
When her stylish jeans are ruined while on a mission, Kim is forced to skip her trendy Club Banana designer apparel and buy from discount department store Smarty Mart. While there, she and Ron discover clerk Frugal Lucre's plot to use the barcodes of expired products to destroy the Internet.

=== Season 2 (2003–04) ===
No. overall	No. in season	Title	Directed by	Written by	Storyboard by	Original release date	Prod. code
22	1	"Naked Genius"	Steve Loter	Matt Negrete	Troy Adomitis, Dave Filoni & Lyndon Ruddy	July 18, 2003	206
After a mission to stop Drakken from using a top secret machine, Ron suddenly begins exhibiting profound knowledge and intelligence in his algebra writing. When he is kidnapped by Drakken and forced to construct a doomsday device, however, Kim and the subtly-changed Rufus must save him.
23	2	"Grudge Match"	Dave Block	Gary Sperling	Carolyn Gair & Llyn Hunter	July 25, 2003	203
Ron goes to ridiculous lengths to grab the attention of a pretty girl at the theater. Meanwhile, Kim uncovers a conspiracy at the Space Center involving top secret technology, battle robots, and a disgruntled former employee.
24	3	"Two to Tutor"	Dave Block	Kurt Weldon	Sharon Forward, Robert Griggs & John Dorman	August 1, 2003	205
An absurdly skilled Ron schools a hopelessly clueless Kim in the art of cooking at their new elective class while Shego tutors Señor Senior, Jr. in the art of villainy. When the duo set out to steal a valuable recipe, Kim has to put the lessons she's learned to the test.
25	4	"The Ron Factor"	Steve Loter	Gary Sperling	Dave Knott, Lyndon Ruddy & Mike Manley	August 8, 2003	201
Global Justice conducts an intensive study of Ron to determine whether he is the secret to Kim's success. Unfortunately, an evil rival organization called W.E.E. has plans of their own for him.
26	5	"Car Trouble"	Steve Loter	Bill Motz & Bob Roth	Dave Knott & Doug Murphy	August 15, 2003	213
After flunking driver's education, Kim is visited by an artificially intelligent vehicle called Sadie whose creator Dr. Freeman has been kidnapped by Drakken to improve his army of robots.
27a	6a	"Rufus in Show"	Dave Block	Eddie Guzelian	Barry Caldwell	August 22, 2003	207a
Rufus poses as a Peruvian hairless show-dog so that Kim can investigate the mansion of a master jewel thief.
27b	6b	"Adventures in Rufus-Sitting"	Dave Block	Eddie Guzelian	Louie del Carmen	August 22, 2003	207b
Kim agrees to babysit Rufus while Ron is in France for a while. A series of events lead him to become the target of Shego, Duff Killigan, and Monkey Fist when he unknowingly swallows a microchip they're after.
28	7	"Job Unfair"	Dave Block	Nicole Dubuc	Carolyn Gair & Llyn Hunter	August 29, 2003	211
Kim is hot on the trail of Drakken and Shego after they steal a flying weather machine in a bizarre plot to attack Canada. At the same time, a disastrous job affair leaves her to deal with an obsessive janitor and Ron's mysterious spy master.
29	8	"The Golden Years"	Dave Block	Earl Kress	Sharon Forward, Robert Griggs & David Schwartz	September 5, 2003	210
Kim tries to skirt the old fashioned overprotectiveness of her elderly paternal grandmother ‘Nana’ Possible during a visit to Florida while she unravels Drakken's latest mind-controlling plan.
30	9	"Virtu-Ron"	Steve Loter	Mark Palmer	Ashley Lenz, Tom Bernardo & Tim Maltby	September 12, 2003	204
The MMORPG world of Everlot is under the iron grip of an evil figure known only as the Wraithmaster. To impress Zita, Ron plays and excels with the expert advice of Wade. When he and Zita become trapped inside the game, however, he crosses paths with the Wraithmaster who just happens to be competing for her affections as well. Ron's only hope is for the return of the enigmatic Tunnel Lord, the only one strong enough to fight the Wraithmaster head on.
31	10	"The Fearless Ferret"	Steve Loter	Brian Swenlin	Ashley Lenz, Tom Bernardo, Dave Filoni, Troy Adomitis & Nicholas Filippi	October 3, 2003	209
On a trip for his hospital volunteer work Ron is roped into the life of an old wealthy hermit (voiced by Adam West) and assumes his costume and tools as the next Fearless Ferret crime-fighter. However, White Stripe, one of the Fearless Ferret's old enemies, returns for revenge. Discovering Ron's new secret life, Kim finds there is more to his new mentor than meets the eye.
32	11	"Exchange"	Steve Loter	Thomas Hart	Ashley Lenz, Tom Bernardo & Nicholas Filippi	November 7, 2003	225
Middleton High welcomes mysterious wild-haired Japan native Hirotaka while Ron transfers to an equally secret ninja school in a student exchange. As he makes himself at home, Kim and Monique get into a steadily intensifying competition to gain the exchange student's affections. Meanwhile, in Japan, Ron must foil Monkey Fist's attempts to steal the immensely powerful Lotus Blade.
33a	12a	"Rufus vs. Commodore Puddles"	Steve Loter	Brian Sintay	Nicholas Filippi	November 14, 2003	217a
Drakken and Shego attempt to breach Area 51 with a giant poodle that an also-gigantified Rufus must fight, while Ron uses the attack to shoot his monster movie.
33b	12b	"Day of the Snowmen"	Steve Loter	Joseph Molinari	Lyndon Ruddy	November 14, 2003	217b
Kim and Ron must defeat an army of mutant snowmen that come to life and attack Middleton after a freak storm.
34	13	"A Sitch in Time (Part One: Present)"	Steve Loter	Bill Motz & Bob Roth	Dave Knott, Doug Murphy & Troy Adomitis	November 28, 2003	218
Ron is suddenly forced to move away, putting the future of the team in question at a very bad time as Drakken, Shego, Duff Killigan, and Monkey Fist have teamed up to steal the Time Monkey which will give them the ability to alter the very timestream of reality.
35	14	"A Sitch in Time (Part Two: Past)"	Steve Loter	Bill Motz & Bob Roth	Tom Bernardo, Ashley Lenz, Dave Knott & Troy Adomitis	November 28, 2003	219
Kim travels back in time to stop the villains from meddling with her past. However, her enemies are one step ahead and decide to strike in her preschool years when Kim is at her most vulnerable, and then again on her first rescue mission as a pre-teen.
36	15	"A Sitch in Time (Part Three: Future)"	Steve Loter	Bill Motz & Bob Roth	Troy Adomitis, Dave Knott, Nicholas Filippi & Doug Murphy	November 28, 2003	220
Kim and Ron take the battle to Shego, who has stolen the Time Monkey for herself to take over the world, in a dystopian Middleton of the future.: Note: All three parts originally aired as a whole hour movie; "Kim Possible: A Sitch in Time", and in America are rarely broadcast separately. They are sold on the iTunes Store and other websites in the US as separate episodes.
37	16	"A Very Possible Christmas"	Dave Block	Mark Palmer	Barry Caldwell, Louie del Carmen, Sharon Forward & Carolyn Gair	December 5, 2003	215
Ron is disappointed that his favorite Christmas special, Snowman Hank, has been canceled and replaced. Meanwhile, as a gift to Kim, Ron decides to foil Drakken's latest world-conquering plan himself so that she can enjoy the festivities with her family. But when he and Drakken end up stranded in the North Pole, Kim, her family, and Shego have to search for them.
38	17	"Queen Bebe"	Dave Block	Greg Weisman	Barry Caldwell, Louie del Carmen, Robert Griggs & Llyn Hunter	December 19, 2003	212
Kim gets swamped with commitments and obligations to all her clubs and school organizations. To make matters worse, Drakken's robotic Bebes have returned and gained super speed.: Guest star: Smash Mouth as themselves
39	18	"Hidden Talent"	Dave Block	Michael A. Newton	Carolyn Gair, Dave Schwartz, Sharon Forward & Llyn Hunter	January 2, 2004	221
Ron signs an unwilling Kim up for the school talent show after Bonnie announces her intent to crush any competition. Her plans to sing are interrupted when Wade begins acting erratically and makes Kim and Ron recover a supposedly stolen teleportation device from Professor Dementor, the duo unaware they are being secretly manipulated by Drakken and Shego.
40	19	"Return to Camp Wannaweep"	Dave Block	Matt Negrete	John Nevarez, Llyn Hunter, Francisco Barrios & Holly Forsyth	January 16, 2004	222
On their way to cheerleading camp, the squad again finds itself at Camp Wannaweep for the Spirit Stick Competition. Kim deals with having Bonnie as her bunk-room partner while Ron cannot overcome his strong suspicions about an apparently reformed and cured Gill.
41	20	"Go Team Go"	Dave Block	Nicole Dubuc	Sharon Forward, Carolyn Gair, John Nevarez, Tom Bernardo & Nicholas Filippi	January 30, 2004	214
On a trip to bustling Go City, a bird-themed supervillain named Aviarius attacks the Bueno Nacho Ron and Kim are visiting, and Kim inadvertently gains super-strength when she attempts to foil the villain. The two teens quickly find themselves involved with the retired superhero group, Team Go, who, Kim quickly learns, are Shego's brothers. But with Team Go powerless against Aviarius and their two youngest members captured, they must enlist the help of none other than Shego herself.: Guest star: Fred Savage
42	21	"The Full Monkey"	Dave Block	Thomas Hart & Zach Stones	Barry Caldwell, Louie del Carmen, Fred Gonzales & Holly Forsyth	February 13, 2004	224
Kim accidentally becomes bonded with a mystic amulet while fighting Monkey Fist, and begins transforming into a monkey. Ron must find a way to change her back while avoiding the complications Josh Mankey's attention may provide.
43	22	"Blush"	Dave Block	Laura McCreary	Barry Caldwell, Louie del Carmen, Fred Gonzales, Robert Griggs & Dave Knott	February 20, 2004	223
Just in time to complicate her growing crush on Josh Mankey, Drakken sprays Kim with a rare pollen that creates a hole on her bellybutton that makes her slowly vanish more and more each time she's embarrassed. Ron and Wade's attempts to find another dose of pollen are complicated when Kim is asked out on a date by Josh, and now Kim must fight Drakken and Shego without Josh finding out about them.
44	23	"Partners"	Dave Block	Gary Sperling	Louie del Carmen & Barry Caldwell	March 12, 2004 (Note: This episode was first released on The Secret Files VHS/DVD on September 2, 2003.)	202
Kim, hoping not to be landed with Ron as her science project partner, instead gets a brainiac who won’t let her do anything at all. Monique gets Ron and quickly becomes exasperated by his trademark laziness. Meanwhile, Drakken charms DNAmy into creating a giant monster for him.
45	24	"Oh Boyz"	Steve Loter	Sheryl Scarborough & Kayte Kuch	Tom Bernardo, Dave Knott, Ashley Lenz & Zac Moncrief	April 2, 2004	226
To help his son's ongoing quest to become a pop music sensation, Señor Senior, Sr. kidnaps the Oh Boyz band to blackmail their record company. The plan backfires when Ron winds up captured along with them. The record executive, finding the Oh Boyz' disappearance to be a profit windfall, is in no hurry to help so Kim must rescue Ron and the band on her own.
46a	25a	"Sick Day"	Dave Block	Matt Negrete & Thomas Hart	Sharon Forward, Llyn Hunter & Carolyn Gair	April 23, 2004	231a
Kim catches a nasty cold from the Tweebs, but still accepts a mission to guard a mysterious machine. After Drakken and Shego steal the device, her mother insists that she stay in bed to rest while Ron and then the Tweebs take up her duties. By the time matters are resolved, everybody on both sides of the conflict has caught the cold.
46b	25b	"The Truth Hurts"	Dave Block	Matt Negrete	John Nevarez, Robert Griggs & Dave Bullock	April 23, 2004	231b
In a mission to save a prominent scientist from Drakken, Kim and Ron are hit with a truth-telling raygun. Ron adapts well to his new honesty while Kim has to bite her tongue during a visit from Dr. Possible's bosses.
47	26	"Mother's Day"	Steve Loter	Story by : Nunzio DeFilippis &Christina Weir; Teleplay by : Thomas Hart	Ashley Lenz, Tom Bernardo, Nathan Chew, Nicholas Filippi & Dave Knott	May 7, 2004	216
As a part of Mother's Day mother-daughter bonding, Kim and her mother Dr. Possible decide to foil Drakken's latest scheme together. Drakken, on his part, is forced to deal with the unexpected visit of his mother while he attempts to steal a batch of Syntho-Plasma.
48	27	"Motor Ed"	Dave Block	Laura McCreary	Carolyn Gair, Sharon Forward, Llyn Hunter, Dave Filoni & Dave Bullock	May 21, 2004	208
After a series of high tech robberies, Kim must stop the plot of a rogue scientist-turned rocking trucker called Motor Ed, with a little help from her new friend Felix.
49	28	"Ron Millionaire"	Nicholas Filippi	Bill Motz & Bob Roth	Nicholas Filippi, Dave Knott, Troy Adomitis & Kyle Menke	June 4, 2004	228
Naco royalties suddenly make Ron a tremendously wealthy multimillionaire, then he proceeds to squander his newfound fortune on a posse of fake friends and spending binges. Out of greed, Drakken steals Ron's money to complete his latest doomsday scheme.: Song (s) featured: "Celebration"
50	29	"Triple S"	Steve Loter	Nicole Dubuc	Nathan Chew, Dave Knott, Troy Adomitis, Zac Moncrief & Kyle Menke	July 26, 2004	227
After a long list of attempts to turn himself into a jock go sour, Ron gets a new chance to compete in the X games when he and Kim are sent to investigate a series of robberies seemingly involving the Seniors, who have recently lost their wealth to a white-collar criminal.
51	30	"Rewriting History"	Dave Block	Michael A. Newton	Louie del Carmen, Barry Caldwell, Tom Bernardo, Carolyn Gair & Dave Knott	August 5, 2004	230
Kim discovers a century-old scandal involving the theft of a wondrous energy storage device, her paternal great-great aunt Miriam "Mim", and amusingly the ancestors of many of her friends and foes including Ron, Professor Dementor, Dr. Drakken, Shego, and Wade's great-grand uncle Wayne. Kim must work quickly to both clear the name of her paternal great-great aunt "Mim" and find the device in time before the entirely Tri City is destroyed by the massive explosion it will create.

=== Season 3 (2004–06) ===
Note: From episode 52 to the end of the series, all episodes were directed by Steve Loter.

No. overall	No. in season	Title	Written by	Storyboard by	Original release date	Prod. code
52	1	"Steal Wheels"	Brian Swenlin	Kyle Menke, Nicholas Filippi & Luke Brookshier	September 25, 2004	301
In an attempt to reform Eddie Lipsky (a.k.a. Motor Ed), his aunt places him under the care of his cousin, Drew. Together, the two plot to steal the technology powering Felix's wheelchair to construct a destructive vehicle. In the meantime, Kim is jealous of all the time Ron is spending with Felix so she tries joining in on their fun.
53	2	"Emotion Sickness"	Brian Swenlin	Tom Bernardo & Lyndon Ruddy	October 15, 2004	302
In an attempt to foil yet another scheme of Drakken to steal an electromagnetic accelerator, experimental mood-altering devices accidentally get attached to Kim and Shego. As a result, confusion and mayhem for both Ron and Drakken ensue as the devices send the girls hurtling through a range of emotions, including anger, sorrow, and even love.
54	3	"Bonding"	John Behnke & Rob Humphrey	Dave Bullock, Troy Adomitis, Robb Pratt, Kyle Menke, Craig Rousseau & Adam Van Wyk	October 22, 2004	303
After an unsuccessful mission to stop Dementor, Kim and Ron are struck with an experimental adhesive and must learn to live life attached to Bonnie and Barkin, respectively.
55	4	"Bad Boy"	Nicole Dubuc	Todd Britton, Carolyn Gair, Jennifer Graves, Craig Kemplin & Lyndon Ruddy	January 14, 2005	304
When Ron wants to avoid his devilishly warped Cousin Shaun at a wedding, Kim subtly suggests than Ron take her as a friendly date. Drakken meanwhile attempts to use a HenchCo. device called the Attitudinator to make himself more evil. The plan fails when Kim and Ron break the machine, transferring Drakken's evilness into Ron and Ron's goodness into Drakken.
56	5	"Showdown at the Crooked D"	Mark Palmer	Dave Knott, Nicholas Filippi, Troy Adomitis, Fred Gonzales, Tom Bernardo & Kyle Menke	March 25, 2005 (Note: This episode was first released in The Villain Files VHS/DVD on December 7, 2004.)	229
When Kim and her family visit her paternal uncle in Montana she finds herself dealing with Joss, her cousin and biggest fan, who wants to be just like her. Together, the two of them must foil Drakken's latest scheme to put the brightest scientific minds on the planet out of commission.
57	6	"Dimension Twist"	Tracy Berna	Todd Britton, Lyndon Ruddy, Robb Pratt, Fred Gonzales & Nicholas Filippi	April 1, 2005	308
Drakken's latest stolen invention causes him, Shego, Kim, Ron, and Rufus to be sucked into the world of cable TV.
58a	7a	"Overdue"	Jim Peterson	Eugene Salandra, Jennifer Graves & Robb Pratt	April 15, 2005	309a
Ron races through the lairs of several of Kim's enemies in order to recover an overdue book of hers he lost and she took the blame for.
58b	7b	"Roachie"	Brian Swenlin	David Prince & LeSean Thomas	April 15, 2005	309b
Evil scientist Chester Yapsby unleashes an army of giant cockroaches on Middleton, one with whom Ron unexpectedly bonds.
59	8	"Rappin’ Drakken"	Bob Schooley & Mark McCorkle	Nicholas Filippi, Louie del Carmen, Jennifer Graves & Dave Knott	June 25, 2005	311
After the dramatic failure of his latest plot, Drakken turns to a televised music contest to promote his own line of mind-controlling shampoo. To thwart his plans, Kim decides to enter in the show herself.
60	9	"Team Impossible"	John Behnke & Rob Humphrey	Louie del Carmen, Robert Griggs, Lyndon Ruddy & Dave Knott	August 26, 2005	313
Team Impossible, the world's premier action and rescue team confront Kim and demand that she end her world saving career, which is cutting into their profit margin. When Kim refuses to do so she suddenly finds that the network of connections which allow her to travel the world is missing, leading to a confrontation with her competitive rivals.
61	10	"Gorilla Fist"	Bob Schooley & Mark McCorkle	Troy Adomitis, Louie del Carmen & Lyndon Ruddy	November 18, 2005 (Note: This episode was first released in Kim Possible: So the Drama DVD on May 10, 2005.)	312
Ron is enlisted by Yori, his lady friend and classmate from the Yamanuchi Ninja School to help find their missing Sensei, who has supposedly been kidnapped by Monkey Fist. A suspicious and jealous Kim pursues them.
62	11	"And the Mole Rat Will Be CGI"	Mark Drop	Dave Knott & Tom Bernardo	June 10, 2006	310
After gaining the attention of a movie director, Kim and Ron are followed by two glamorous movie stars, one of them attempting to learn about their lives for an upcoming Kim Possible film. Kim soon finds herself pushed aside by her star's copycat antics, while Ron cannot get his to act at all. The film is put on hold when Señor Senior, Jr. crashes the set and demands to be cast as the picture's villain.: Note: This is the only episode that aired in 2006.
63	12	"So the Drama"	Bob Schooley & Mark McCorkle	Nicholas Filippi, Troy Adomitis, Dave Knott, Tom Bernardo, Dave Bullock, Kyle Menke, Adam Van Wyk, Todd Britton & Eugene Salandra	April 8, 2005	305
64	13	"So the Drama"	Bob Schooley & Mark McCorkle	Nicholas Filippi, Troy Adomitis, Dave Knott, Tom Bernardo, Dave Bullock, Kyle Menke, Adam Van Wyk, Todd Britton & Eugene Salandra	April 8, 2005	306
65	14	"So the Drama"	Bob Schooley & Mark McCorkle	Nicholas Filippi, Troy Adomitis, Dave Knott, Tom Bernardo, Dave Bullock, Kyle Menke, Adam Van Wyk, Todd Britton & Eugene Salandra	April 8, 2005	307
On the eve of Kim's Junior Prom, Drakken begins his first truly serious attempt to conquer the world while trying to find Kim's weakness. Meanwhile, when handsome new student Eric comes between Kim and Ron's close friendship, they are forced at long last to examine their true feelings for each other and the nature of their relationship.: Note: This movie was originally intended to be the series finale before the series was renewed due to popular demand.

=== Crossover with Lilo & Stitch: The Series (2005) ===
No. overall	No. in season	Title	Directed by	Written by	Storyboard by	Original release date	Prod. code
58	19	"Rufus"	Victor Cook	Jim Peronto	Ken Boyer, David Schwartz, Troy Adomitis & Tom Bernardo	August 26, 2005	208 (L&S:TS)
When Stitch is captured by Drakken, Pleakley calls on the help of Kim Possible to rescue him. Although they initially both want the other to step aside, Lilo and Kim must work together to accomplish this goal. Also, Jumba mistakes Rufus for the dangerous Experiment 607.: Notes: The events of this crossover episode are before Kim Possible Movie: So the Drama.

=== Season 4 (2007) ===
No. overall	No. in season	Title	Written by	Storyboard by	Original release date	Prod. code
66	1	"Ill Suited"	Brian Swenlin	Kyle Menke & Tom Bernardo	February 10, 2007	401
It's the start of Kim and Ron's fourth and last year at Middleton High School as seniors, and they're still in a relationship after the events of the So the Drama movie. Ron, however, starts to believe that Kim will dump him for a jock, and "secretly borrows" Kim's experimental enhanced battle suit from the movie to join the football team. Meanwhile, Dementor attempts to steal the battle suit for his own uses.
67	2	"The Big Job"	Kurt Weldon	Alan Wan & Kalvin Lee	February 10, 2007	404
Ron takes Kim out to dinner, embarrassing her by ordering the kiddie menu so he can use a "kids eat free" coupon. After some nudging from Kim and Monique, Ron tries looking for a job, only to lose each of them after some mishap or other. Meanwhile, Drakken rants to his cellmate Frugal Lucre that he will surely be broken out of prison any time now. A helicopter arrives, dangles the ladder near the window… and then moves off to another cellblock to blow a hole in Shego's cell wall and fly her out. It turns out that Señor Senior Junior broke her out to help pull off "a big job" as a birthday present for his father.: Note: This episode takes place after "Car Alarm".
68	3	"Trading Faces"	Kim Duran	James Yang, Eugene Salandra & Kalvin Lee	February 10, 2007	403
Mysterious crimes are committed by celebrity friends of heiress Camille Léon and Kim has to find out why. Meanwhile, Kim's brothers are advanced through school and join her in high school and, much to her dismay, her missions.
69	4	"The Cupid Effect"	Charleen Easton	Dave Knott	February 10, 2007	409
It's Valentine's Day, and Wade develops a strong crush on Monique, which makes him invent a love ray so that she will return his affections. Meanwhile, Ron takes Kim and Monique to Paris, France, and the Seniors try to conquer half the world using Wade's new invention so that every girl will fall head-over-heels in love with Jr.
70	5	"Car Alarm"	John Behnke & Rob Humphrey	Dave Knott, Doug Murphy & Kalvin Lee	February 17, 2007	402
Kim finally manages to get her own car: a literal fixer-upper that her dad once owned. However, chaos ensues when the Tweebs volunteer to trick it out. Meanwhile, in prison, Drakken has had enough of his cellmate Frugal Lucre when Motor Ed arrives with a large mech, but instead of Drakken, he frees Shego. Shego opts to go on her own, but reluctantly agrees to assist in his latest caper.: Note: This episode takes place before "The Big Job".
71	6	"Mad Dogs and Aliens"	Brian Swenlin	Dave Knott, Tom Bernardo & Larry Scholl	February 24, 2007	405
Jim and Tim take over Middleton Mad Dog duties at the high school, much to Ron's chagrin. Drakken is finally broken out of prison by a towering alien woman named Warmonga, who believes him to be "the Great Blue", prophesied by her people, the Lorwardians, to lead them to universal conquest.
72	7	"Grande Size Me"	Kurt Weldon	Eugene Salandra & James Yang	March 3, 2007	407
In an attempt to prove the Wheel of Good Eating wrong, Ron gains a dangerous amount of weight by eating nothing but Bueno Nacho, but soon this rebellious act turns deadly when he falls into a vat of serum during an investigation at HenchCo. and it transforms him into a giant rampaging mutant, while Kim must protect a HenchCo. device from falling into the wrong hands.
73	8	"Clothes Minded"	Kim Duran & Stephanie Phillips	Eugene Salandra & James Yang	March 17, 2007	408
When Kim's usual mission attire is no longer available for purchase at Club Banana, she tries to look for a new one, all while worrying about college admissions and Drakken's latest scheme to reform the continents into the next Pangaea.: Note: This episode takes place after "Big Bother" and "Fashion Victim".
74	9	"Big Bother"	Greg Weisman	Alan Wan, James Yang, Kalvin Lee & Louie del Carmen	April 7, 2007	410
Ron has his hands full when he has to care for both a sack of flour (as part of a school project) and his new adopted baby sister Hana, not to mention help track down Monkey Fist, who is in search of three stone keys that will lead him to a secret weapon. To make matters worse, he also has to break the news to his old crush Yori that he and Kim are dating now.: Note: This episode takes place before "Clothes Minded".
75	10	"Fashion Victim"	Kim Duran	Dave Knott	April 14, 2007	406
A trio of fashion-obsessed criminals, the Fashionistas, seek to make off with Club Banana's newest fashion designs. Camille Léon, having allied with them, also takes the opportunity to get revenge on Kim by framing her for the theft. With Ron currently putting up with Mr. Barkin, who also works at Smarty Mart, her last hope lies in Monique.: Note: This episode takes place before "Clothes Minded".
76	11	"Odds Man In"	Denise Moss	Kyle Menke & Tom Bernardo	April 28, 2007	411
Ron decides to make some crime fighting calculations to see how much danger he and Kim are in during their missions. Meanwhile, Drakken is helped by corporate consultant Hank Perkins with his latest take-over-the-world scheme to bring forth the next Ice Age.
77	12	"Stop Team Go"	Kurt Weldon	Eugene Salandra, Adam Van Wyk & Louie del Carmen	May 5, 2007	413
When Shego appears at Middleton High School as a substitute teacher, Kim is shocked to learn that her old rival is actually acting nice for once. However, it's not a voluntary decision on Shego's part. Rather, she and her brothers, Team Go, have been affected by their old enemy Electronique with her recently stolen, new—and improved—Attitudinator.
78	13	"Cap'n Drakken"	Kim Duran	Doug Murphy & Dave Knott	May 19, 2007	415
Kim and Ron are forced by Mr. Barkin to spend a week at the seaport (without any modern items of any type), where Drakken opens a treasure chest and becomes possessed by a pirate captain's spirit.
79	14	"Mathter and Fervent"	Jim Peronto	Alan Wan & Kalvin Lee	June 17, 2007	412
A freak altercation with Team Go's number-focused foe, the Mathter, leaves Ron affected by his power. Now, Ron's destroying everything he touches, and Kim and Hego need to do something.
80	15	"The Mentor of Our Discontent"	Henry Gilroy	Alan Wan & Troy Adomitis	June 23, 2007	416
Martin Smarty gives Ron a new job at Smarty Mart – be a role model for his rebellious son, Artie. Meanwhile, Drakken and Frugal Lucre team up to take control of Smarty Mart's new stockbots.
81	16	"Oh No! Yono!"	Brian Swenlin	Eugene Salandra & Adam Van Wyk	July 1, 2007	417
After discovering baby Hana walking on the ceiling, Kim and Ron try to get to the bottom of her secrets. Soon, they are called by Master Sensei and Yori, who ask them to help stop Monkey Fist, who has found a new ally in Yono the Destroyer as he continues his search for the secret weapon.: Note: This episode takes place after "Larry's Birthday"
82	17	"Clean Slate"	Mark Palmer	Tom Bernardo, Louie del Carmen, James Yang & Larry Scholl	July 28, 2007	418
Kim is struck by amnesia during a mission, while Drakken attempts to gain control of the military. Kim soon remembers everything about her life again, except the fact that she and Ron are a couple.
83	18	"Homecoming Upset"	Michael Newton	Dave Bullock, Doug Murphy, James Yang & Larry Scholl	August 11, 2007	419
Things get out of control when Ron and Bonnie become the homecoming king and queen. Now Kim has two problems to deal with – a computer expert seemingly kidnapped by Señor Senior, Jr. and Bonnie making a move on her boyfriend.
84a	19a	"Chasing Rufus"	Kim Duran	Lyndon Ruddy	August 12, 2007	414a
After both Ron Stoppable and Camille Léon accidentally lose their pets behind during a fight, Rufus and Debutante go on an adventure across the globe to find their respective owners.
84b	19b	"Nursery Crimes"	Charlotte Fullerton & Kurt Weldon	Tom Bernardo	August 12, 2007	414b
When the mysterious and creepy Nanny Maim begins reverting people into super babies and using them in a world-wide robbing spree, Kim must use her natural babysitting skills to save the day.
85	20	"Larry's Birthday"	Kurt Weldon	Alan Wan, Troy Adomitis, Ken Laramay, James Yang & Larry Scholl	September 1, 2007	420
Kim must keep her cousin Larry away until his surprise birthday party is ready, as well as stopping Dementor from stealing her battle suit.: Note: This episode takes place before "Oh No! Yono!"
86	21	"Graduation"	Thomas Hart & Brian Swenlin	Tom Bernardo, Kyle Menke, Adam Van Wyk & Louie del Carmen	September 7, 2007	421
87	22	"Graduation"	Thomas Hart & Brian Swenlin	Louie del Carmen, Kyle Menke, Dave Knott, Doug Murphy, Adam Van Wyk & Nicholas Filippi	September 7, 2007	422
While Ron worries that graduation means the end of his romantic relationship with Kim, a vengeful Warmonga returns with her battle-mate, Warhawk the Conqueror, to invade Earth. On graduation day, Kim is abducted along with Drakken by the alien invaders, and must work alongside him, Ron, and Shego to foil the Lorwardians' planetary assault.: Note: This episode premiered as a one-hour series finale special, but was separated into two parts for subsequent broadcasts.

== See also ==
- List of Lilo & Stitch: The Series episodes - includes "Rufus"
