= Kim Possible (character) =

- Kim Possible character
- Kim Possible, as depicted by the series' character designer Stephen Silver with his signature.
- First appearance: "Crush" (2002)
- Created by: Bob Schooley; Mark McCorkle
- Voiced by: Christy Carlson Romano
- Portrayed by: Sadie Stanley
- Height: 5 ft 2 in (157 cm)

In-universe information
- Full name: Kimberly Ann Possible
- Nicknames: Kim; K.P.; Kimmie
- Gender: Female
- Occupation: High school student Crime-fighter; Cheerleader; Clothing store sales associate
- Family: James Possible (father); Ann Possible (mother); Jim and Tim Possible (brothers)
- Significant other: Ron Stoppable (boyfriend)
- Relatives: "Nana" Possible (paternal grandmother) "Slim" Possible (paternal uncle); Joss Possible and Larry (cousins)
- Enemies: Dr. Drakken, Shego (both formerly)
- Nationality: American
- Abilities: Peak human strength, agility, and reflexes; Acrobatic and gymnastic cheerleading skills; 16 styles of Kung fu

Kimberly Ann Possible is a fictional character from the Disney Channel animated television series Kim Possible (2002–2007). She was created by series creators Bob Schooley and Mark McCorkle, and appears in all 87 of the show's episodes. Kim is an ambitious high school student who freelances as a world-renowned crime-fighter, while balancing her personal life, schoolwork, and complications associated with coming of age. She was voiced by actress Christy Carlson Romano.

Inspired by the lack of strong female leads in children's animation at the time, Schooley and McCorkle conceived Kim as a teenage girl who can achieve anything, wanting their daughters to have their own childhood hero reminiscent of James Bond. To help the character appeal to both girls and boys, they decided to reverse traditional gender roles by making Kim a capable action hero and her male best friend, Ron Stoppable, her comedic sidekick, but humanized her by keeping her non-superpowered with challenges in her personal life. The character's design evolved during early development of the series, from resembling a video game heroine or bombshell to a younger, more realistic interpretation of a teenage girl.

Kim has been positively received by critics, who described her as a strong role model and compared her to previous crime-fighting television heroines, notably Buffy Summers from Buffy the Vampire Slayer. She has also been praised by feminist critics, who commended her for defying gender norms and challenging negative stereotypes associated with cheerleaders and teenage girls. The character's popularity and impact have been cited as influences on subsequent female-led animated shows.

In addition to two television films, Kim Possible: A Sitch in Time (2003) and Kim Possible Movie: So the Drama (2005), the character's likeness has been used in a variety of tie-in merchandise, toys, and a video game series. Actress Sadie Stanley played the character in the 2019 live-action television film adaption.

== Role ==
Kim Possible fights crime alongside her best friend and sidekick Ron Stoppable, aided by his pet naked mole-rat Rufus and 10 year-old computer genius Wade. She lives in the fictional town of Middleton, USA with her parents James and Ann, who work as a rocket scientist and neurosurgeon respectively, and her two younger brothers, identical twins Jim and Tim. Kim goes on missions to save the world from danger at the hands of various supervillains and evil geniuses. Her most consistent adversaries are mad scientist Dr. Drakken and his sidekick Shego, the latter of whom is a former superheroine who can generate powerful energy blasts from her hands, and serves as her main combatant and threat.

Kim becomes a crime-fighter unintentionally. In search of odd jobs, she builds her own website to promote her babysitting and lawn mowing services, promoting the slogan "I can do anything". When a wealthy entrepreneur becomes trapped by his own laser security system and, due to a typo, contacts Kim Possible instead of the for-profit crime-fighting organization Team Impossible, Kim rushes to his aid and uses her gymnastic skills to disable the device. As news of Kim's heroics spread and her demand increases, she finally decides to pursue it as a freelance career. Although hardly a typical teenager, Kim insists she is a "basic average girl" and therefore must cope with usual adolescent affairs, such as maintaining good grades in school, pleasing her parents, learning to drive, dating and relationships, and attending cheerleading practice. She is a member of her high school's cheer squad, and has a long-standing rivalry with Bonnie Rockwaller, a classmate and fellow cheerleader.

Because Kim is too young to legally drive for most of the series, she relies on favors from friends – typically clients she has helped – for transportation to distant missions. Eventually, Kim inherits her own car from her father. Meanwhile, Jim and Tim are enrolled at Middleton High School, having skipped several grades due to their genius-level intellect, much to Kim's chagrin. However, Kim eventually relents and insists that her brothers continue attending the same school as her, threatening to leave the school if they do.

== Development ==
=== Creation and writing ===
According to longtime writing partners Bob Schooley and Mark McCorkle, the idea for Kim Possible originated from "out of the blue" after they realized there were few animated television shows starring strong female leads. Both McCorkle and Schooley had written on the male-led animated series Aladdin and Hercules for several years but longed to develop an original project, and had recently discovered that young people were yearning for programs depicting "ordinary kids in extraordinary circumstances". Thus, Schooley and McCorkle conceived Kim as a "girl who can do anything". Unlike other shows being produced by Disney Television Animation at the time, Kim Possible offered the writers a first-time opportunity to create an entirely new character "from scratch", which Schooley found refreshing compared to writing for pre-existing characters. McCorkle recalled that some fans of the show are surprised to learn that Kim's creators are men because of how accurately they captured a teenage girl.

Schooley's and McCorkle's daughters inspired them to envision Kim as a character both their own daughters and other girls could look up to. They were mindful of the "ancient truism" that while girls rarely hesitate to watch shows about male leads, boys are often less likely to do the opposite. To challenge these norms, the creators decided to reverse traditional gender roles by making Kim the show's competent action hero and Ron her "fumbling" sidekick. They hoped to offer young girls an original "character that they can pretend to be", drawing inspiration from their own childhood idols James Bond, Captain Kirk from Star Trek, and James West from The Wild Wild West, and grounding the character in reality by not giving her supernatural powers. Although Kim has much more in common with Bond than comic book superheroes, the creators wanted her to evolve as a person and not remain static like Bond, which inspired the "saving the world is easy, high school is hard" motif maintained throughout the series. They also have the character openly mock common tropes associated with spy and superhero media. Schooley also cited Buffy Summers from Buffy the Vampire Slayer as a direct influence on Kim due to the show emphasizing female empowerment and exploring the heroine's personal life. To help the series feel "real", the writers decided to have Kim's peers react to her adventures ambivalently, explaining, “We made the decision early on that everybody knows what she does and nobody really cares, because it's high school and they have their own priorities. What you do outside of high school doesn't matter".

Schooley and McCorkle created the recurring character Monique because they felt it would be more realistic if Kim had a female best friend alongside Ron. After three years, production on Kim Possible had virtually ceased after the premiere of Kim Possible Movie: So the Drama because the writers felt that finally establishing Kim and Ron as a couple would serve as a natural, satisfying conclusion to the series, and thus had long stopped creating new "outlets" for the character during the show's third season. Although Schooley and McCorkle had always intended for Kim and Ron to eventually date each other, they delayed coupling them for as long as possible to avoid "paint[ing] [themselves] into a corner". When the show was surprisingly renewed for a fourth season, the creators realized Kim and Ron's relationship provided the series with new story and comedy opportunities, and ultimately learned to appreciate the characters' "new dynamic". To prevent Kim and Ron's relationship from becoming "soap-opera-ish", the writers maintained the foundation of their friendship, with Kim continuing to save the world with Ron as her sidekick. For the fourth season, the show's main titles were updated adjusted to confirm that Kim had developed and matured from high school sophomore to high school senior.

=== Design, personality and abilities ===
Schooley and McCorkle understood the importance of designing an appealing animated character for television. Kim's appearance evolved drastically over the course of three months. The character originally resembled "a pretty standard-looking athletic blonde", which was gradually changed to a more distinctive design. At one point, Kim's appearance was inspired by Lara Croft from the Tomb Raider video games, but Disney Channel felt Lara was "not a very real character". Early versions of the character were based on Schooley and McCorkle's assistant, resulting in an older, more worldly appearance. Wanting the show's characters to look their age, the creators adopted a more realistic design akin to that of a 14 year-old girl to avoid the aesthetic of bombshells and video game heroines. Schooley said the character's personality only emerged once she was redesigned to look younger. The creators admitted that Kim would have been their "dream girl" in high school, albeit "way out of our class". Director Chris Baily wanted Kim to have "graphic sensibilities" similar to the show's backgrounds, creating a three-dimensional character "whose feet can be planted on the ground and communicate a sense of space". For example, Kim was drawn without a white outline when dressed in black so she virtually disappears in front of black backgrounds, yet her "simple design" and flesh allows audiences to "fill in where her body is" automatically. Describing Kim as "a mostly graphic heroine", animation historian Giannalberto Bendazzi agreed that the character's "limited animation" was intentional. In the fourth season, the character's signature crop top and cargo pants are replaced by a T-shirt and pants because the former outfit was damaged during a fight with Shego, and some viewers noticed that Kim's face appears to be drawn "rounder" than in previous seasons.

Kim as she appears as a civilian.

Schooley's and McCorkle's daughters inspired them to conceive Kim as a "character with dimension ... that girls could watch and appreciate". McCorkle decided from early development that Kim does not work for a spy organization or possess superpowers, insisting that her accomplishments be relatable despite their implausibility. They avoided making her "impervious" like superheroes by giving her "real problems and teen issues". McCorkle described Kim as "incredibly competent in the action world but challenged in the real world by all the things we all have trouble with", including embarrassment, school work, and family. Schooley explained that Kim's success is rooted in gymnastics, cheerleading, and physical activity, "something that any kid, any girl, in the world could do". Elaborating on her role in the pilot, Schooley believes "Kim's mix of tenacity, intelligence and heart makes for a very strong female role model for kids ... but that doesn't help her a bit when she comes face-to-face with her latest school crush". At one point during the series, Kim acquires an indestructible supersuit with its own special abilities, but the outfit was written out to avoid undermine the character's "she can do anything" motto. Furthermore, the writers envisioned the character having her own website and hand-held communicator – named the "Kimmunicator" after the character – with video chat, both of which were considered revolutionary back in 2000 when few young people owned cellphones. Kim's use of advanced technology mirrored the internet becoming more common in children's lives, allowing them to "talk to somebody anywhere".

Kim's main aspiration is to simply to help others regardless of money or rewards, which Schooley and McCorkle deliberately instilled in the character. One of her trademark gags involves her thanking people for providing her with transportation, to which they respond "No, thank you, for saving us". Although primarily writers, Schooley and McCorkle remained thoroughly involved in determining the overall appearance of the series, as well as the design of its characters. However, they accredit the majority of the series' aesthetics to season one director Chris Baily and artistic director Alan Bodner. Cartoonist Stephen Silver served as a character animator on the show. Romano recalled that Kim often wore different outfits, which she opined "made Kim feel like a real teenage girl" and was unusual for Disney animation at the time.

=== Voice ===
Kim is voiced by American actress Christy Carlson Romano, who was 16 years-old when she was cast. Before being cast in Kim Possible, Romano had already been known for starring as Ren Stevens on the Disney Channel sitcom Even Stevens, and had filmed the Disney Channel Original Movie Cadet Kelly (2002) shortly prior. Disney Channel executive Gary Marsh suggested they audition Romano for Kim Possible. The actress was finally introduced to the show's creators by Disney Channel executives after Schooley and McCorkle had already auditioned several candidates for the role. Romano "nailed" her audition, according to McCorkle. Romano's casting made her the first actor to star in three Disney Channel projects simultaneously. The original Kim Possible pilot featured actress Alyson Hannigan as the voice of Kim, but the network found her efforts were not exaggerated enough for an animated show. The title role was offered to actress Anneliese van der Pol, who turned it down to star as Chelsea Daniels on the Disney Channel Original Series That's So Raven instead.

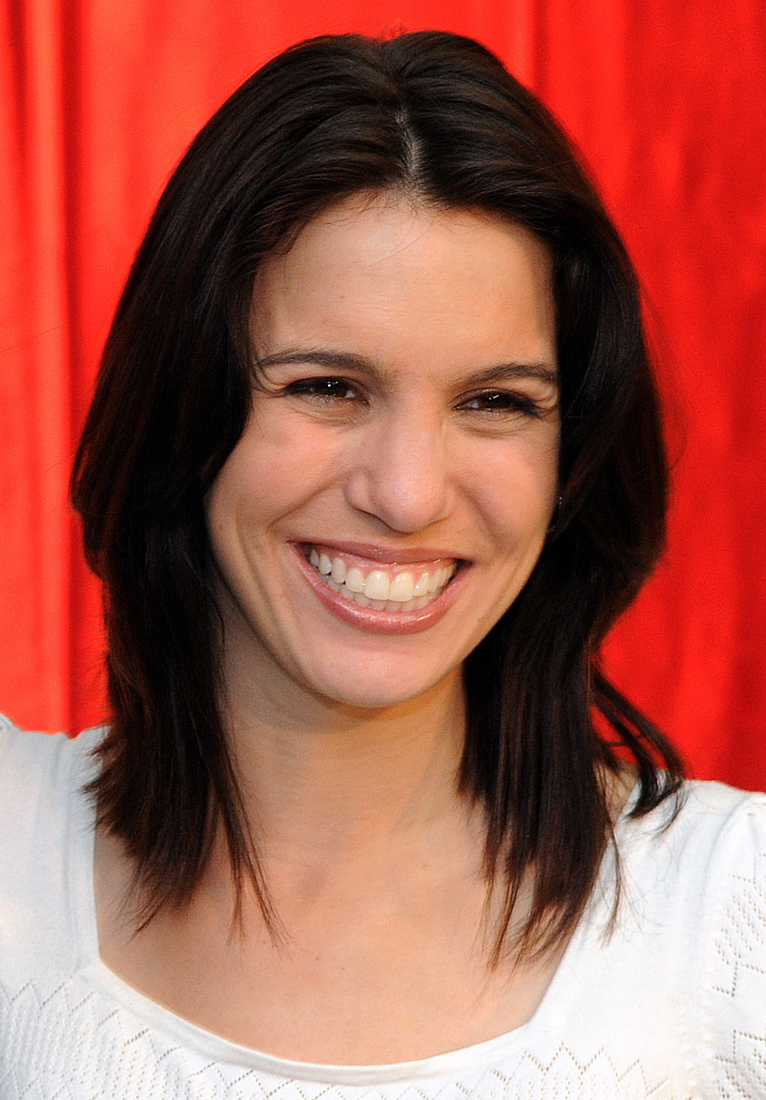
Actress Christy Carlson Romano voices Kim.

Kim was Romano's first voice-acting role. Upon being cast, Romano immediately identified with the character because they were both dealing with similar teenage issues at the time. Like her character, Romano also balanced her profession with her schoolwork, and agreed that she and Kim are both confident in their pursuits. During the show's first season, Romano and the rest of the Kim Possible cast recorded separately from different locations. Because the actress was attending high school in New York City at the time, she often participated in cast meetings and table reads via telephone; Romano was unable to attend her own senior prom due to scheduling conflicts with Kim Possible.

Occasionally, the actress herself would serve as creative inspiration for the show's writers; one episode in particular, "Blush", was based on Romano's shyness and tendency blush with embarrassment from the slightest compliment or awkward situation. The writers also gave Kim several interests that are similar to Romano's own, such as naming Kim's workplace, Club Banana, after Romano's favorite store at the time, Club Monaco. Romano also suggested Kim's catchphrase "What's the sitch?" when the creators asked her what she would say to ask "Hey, what's up?" in a "modern" way. Schooley enthused that the actress "add[s] something to [her character] that makes it more than a typical gag-oriented cartoon", crediting both her and co-star Will Friedle, voice of Ron, among reasons fans connected with these characters.

Romano described Kim as a highly ambitious, talented, and smart character, who she attempted to make as strong a role model as possible. She considers Kim a positive role model for young girls in particular, and credits her independence, athleticism, authenticity, and genuineness with forging a path for female-lead television shows. Although she claims she did not sign on to Kim Possible with any specific agenda or intensions, she embraced the opportunity to create an "authentically strong” character. Romano initially doubted the show's success, but eventually embraced its quality of animation and writing, and overall appeal to families. Additionally, Romano cited the character as a great influence on the trajectory of her own career. When voicing Kim, she sometimes felt confident in ways she did not experience outside of the series or in her personal life as a young woman. Romano highlighted the first-season episode "Mind Games", in which Kim and Ron switch bodies, as her favorite from the show. By the end of the series, Romano was 21 years-old and already enrolled at Columbia University. Kim's final recorded line in the series is "uuhhh...huh?", which Romano recorded tearfully due to the series ending. Romano has expressed interest in voicing the character in a reboot on several occasions, going as far as to approach the creators and Disney Channel directly. She said she would be "absolutely devasted" if Disney Channel ever recast her.

== Characterization and themes ==
The character's name, "Kim Possible", is a portmanteau of the word "impossible". Although she is referred to by several nicknames throughout the series, Kim forgoes a secret identity, and is simply known by her full name to "everyone who knows her [and] knows what she does". Kadeen Griffiths of Bustle observed that, instead of a secret identify, Kim maintains "her own website where people could book her for jobs with a tagline that promised that she could do anything", a claim corroborated by the fact that she fights crime while performing well in class and remaining her school's cheerleading captain. Writing for Women Write About Comics, Jamie Kingston observed that Middleton High School "ignores her as a heroine unless something happens on school grounds where she has to do her thing". As such, Kim's work rarely receives attention from her immediate family and peers, although her clients remain grateful. According to Metacritic, Kim is stubborn and strong-willed with "a fuse shorter than a grenade", but remains "extremely humble, refusing to take credit for her truly amazing actions". Meanwhile, David Horiuchi of Amazon.com described the character as "tough, witty, and refreshingly free of any saucy teen attitude".

UGO described Kim as a "cheery and upbeat" character who "settles for nothing less than excellence". Despite her high school popularity, Kim is neither stuck-up nor superficial, and remains fiercely devoted to her schoolwork. The character's intellect counters negative stereotypes associated with cheerleading, often incorporating cheerleading routines into battle, whereas her rival and "polar opposite" Bonnie Rockwaller is depicted as "a typical cheerleader". Described by Tracey McLoone of PopMatters as "clever, as well as graceful and physically fit", the character also disproves the belief that brawn is superior to brains in battle. Nonetheless, Kim exhibits personality traits and interests typically associated with teenage girls, such as shopping, boy bands, fangirling over popular trends, describing herself as "basic average girl". CinemaBlend's Emily Marek said Kim's feminine interests "didn't take away from the fact that she was saving the world on a weekly basis". Her best female friend Monique represents "Kim's bridge between the world of super-spy, superhero action, and the world of high school, and stuff teen girls care about". Despite her confidence as a young woman, Kim remains very much concerned about her love life, which is sometimes treated as one of her weaknesses. Although she excels at fighting, she struggles with real-world issues such as school. Mike McDaniel of the Houston Chronicle joked that "Nothing's impossible with Kim Possible -- except maybe landing a date." Much of the character's dialogue consists of "not-so-typical teen slang" including "So not the drama" and "No big", as well as her catchphrase "What's the sitch?".

Kim's unconventional relationship with her inept, unpopular best friend Ron ultimately uncovers the best in both characters. Ron helps balance some of Kim's negative qualities that could otherwise come off as unflattering. Their relationship heavily explores the friend zone, since Kim and Ron remain platonic friends for the majority of the series, although their romantic interests in each other is hinted at throughout. Kim has been jealous of Ron's girlfriends at times, while Ron fears confessing his love for her would jeopardize their friendship. Sarah Freymiller of Bustle described Ron as "the Joker to [Kim's] Batman; he is the intelligent, kind chaos in her highly-organized life". Meanwhile, Priya Krishna of BuzzFeed News observed, "At the end of the day, Kim needs Ron, and Ron is always there for her and never feels emasculated by the fact his friend/girlfriend is clearly better than him at everything".

Kim was among several fictional characters who debuted towards the end of the girl power and third-wave feminism eras. As an animated series, Kim Possible employed a diverse cast of strong female characters, namely Kim and Shego. Many of the character's typically feminine belongings double as powerful weapons and tools, namely her lip gloss and compact mirror. In his book Dangerous Curves: Action Heroines, Gender, Fetishism, and Popular Culture, author Jeffrey A. Brown believes that "Kim may be the epitome of a Girl Power-derived heroine". Like Kim herself, her grandmother Nana Possible also fought crime when she was young, from whom Kim is believed to have inherited her abilities. Kim's entire family is very intelligent, therefore the character is spared "the burden of being the only brain on the show". The character's relationship with her parents is atypically healthy for a teenager. Kim's father James "views women as equals", and thus has a good relationship with Kim although he struggles to come to terms with the reality that she is growing up and dating. Her mother Ann is essentially a "grown up" version of Kim, whose work as a brain surgeon Kim also admits to being impressed by. The Artifice observed that Kim and Shego are strikingly similar in appearance. Metacritc believes that Shego is essentially "Kim's dark reflection"; both characters are smart, athletic and attractive with green eyes, but Shego chooses to use her powers for evil instead. Despite their bitter rivalry, Kim and Shego have mutual respect for each other to the point of which they occasionally work together when the situation demands it. According to Metacritic, Kim's "fiery" red hair symbolizes her attitude that is best summed up by the phrase, "I can do anything". The character is infamous for her puppy dog pout, which she often uses to get her way.

== Appearances ==
Kim Possible was very successful, running for a total of five years from June 7, 2002, to September 7, 2007, and spanning four seasons, becoming the longest-running Disney Channel Original Series, until eventually being surpassed by Phineas and Ferb. The series comprised 84 episodes, with Kim starring in each one. Kim also made an appearance in the Lilo & Stitch: The Series crossover episode "Rufus".

Kim, along with Ron and Rufus, also appears on the Disney Channel crossover series Chibiverse. While earlier episodes only featured silent cameos, Romano reprised her role for the first time in 17 years in the episode "Dr. Doof's Lab", followed by Friedle as Ron Stoppable a year later in the episode "Kiff Possible".

=== Epcot theme park attraction ===
In 2009, a theme park attraction entitled the Kim Possible World Showcase Adventure premiered at Walt Disney World's Epcot. Upon arrival, visitors were allowed to partake in an alternate reality game (ARG) inspired by the television series in which they entered into the world of Kim Possible and ventured on a "high-tech scavenger hunt" in a simulated country of their choice. The attraction closed down in 2012 and was replaced by Agent P's World Showcase Adventure, another scavenger hunt-like attraction inspired by the Phineas and Ferb series.

== Reception ==
Response towards Kim has been positive, with critics praising her as a positive, relatable role model for children. Jacqueline Cutler of the Sun-Sentinel hailed the character as "as close to a role model as an animated cheerleader trying to save the world can be". Rob Owen of the Pittsburgh Post-Gazette joked that, despite dressing like singer Britney Spears, Kim shares "the same insecurities as all adolescents". Tracey McLoone of PopMatters believes the show's "merit lies primarily in [its] heroine", while Levi Buchanan of IGN found the character to be "well-fleshed out". The Sunday Mail's Shuhaidah Saharani touted Kim "Disney Channel's favourite femme fatale". Reviewing Kim Possible: So the Drama, the film originally intended to end the series, Amazon.com's David Horiuchi cited the character among the main reasons why the show will be missed. In a 2019 retrospective, Variety's Mekeisha Madden Toby wrote that the series "connected with its audience because it portrayed a strong but fashion-forward young woman who fought crime and got good grades". Paste's Alexis Gunderson crowned Kim the year 2000's "favorite red-headed teen action heroine". Author David Perlmutter said Kim's ability to laugh and poke fun at herself is an important but often overlooked quality of a good hero.

Several reviewers, such as Betsy Wallace of Common Sense Media, also compared Kim to television action heroines who preceded her, namely Buffy Summers from Buffy the Vampire Slayer and Sydney Bristow from Alias, as well as the titular Powerpuff Girls. Horiuchi described Kim as "An Alias-type heroine for the tween-age set" whose "school-girl awkwardness can prove appealing to grown-up kids as well", whereas McLoone appreciated that Kim is seemingly more confident than her contemporaries. Likening Kim to comic book superheroine Wonder Woman, Kathryn Shattuck of The New York Times wrote that Kim is prepared to defend humankind "without sacrificing her interest in boys and clothes", observing that she does not rely on costumes "or a jolt of testosterone to get the job done". The Huffington Post's Carly Steyer credited Kim with teaching the importance of maintaining a healthy work–life balance.

The character has also been well-received by feminist critics, some of whom consider her to be a feminist icon. Laura Samson, a writer for The Express, selected Kim as her childhood hero, describing her as "peak female empowerment in the 2000s. Especially during a time when there was very little female led shows for kids". Writing for Refinery29, Claire Fahey described Kim as "a feminist icon for the millennial generation". Courtney Thompson of Body+Soul claimed Kim was "many women's first feminist role model before we even recognised ourselves, or her, as feminist". Believing there were few female-led action cartoons prior to Kim Possible, Thompson credited the character with "introduc[ing] a new form of girl power we hadn't seen before". Calling her a "cartoon idol", Kadeen Griffiths of Bustle lauded Kim as an "amazingly feminist" character who "taught girls that it was okay to overachieve" and "worrying about boys didn't make you any less of a hero". Both BuzzFeed's Ellie Bate and Bustle's Sarah Freymiller applauded Kim for disproving outdated, sexist stereotypes about cheerleaders, while Pride ranked her among "13 Cartoon Characters Who Defied Gender Stereotypes".

Communications scholar Rebecca Hains cited Kim among several "strong powerful girl [television] heroes" responsible for "breaking the mold" during the early 2000s and "quickly came to be regarded as exemplars of 'girl power'." Stephanie Janssen of The Spectator recalled that "Seeing on the TV that Kim can do anything made me feel like I could do anything, too". Esmeer Rigden-Briscall of Her Campus credited Kim with teaching several valuable feminist lessons, describing her as simultaneously "the most underrated but most needed Kim around". However, some critics felt Kim was merely Disney's attempt to overcompensate for their depiction of female characters as passive and weak in prior decades. Girlfighting: Betrayal and Rejection author Lyn Mikel Brown dismissed Kim as both a feminist and role model because of her perceived reliance on Ron's intelligence, as well as the observation that "Her biggest threat is not evil, in fact, but the head cheerleader". By August 2022, fans of the character had sent her over one million e-mails via her website, hoping to see them posted on the show's website. In 2005, Romano was nominated for a Daytime Emmy Award for Outstanding Performer in an Animated Program.

== Cultural impact ==
=== Legacy ===
Kim has remained popular among both female and male fans of show, serving as inspiration for girls, boys, and adults. In 2022, Emma Shapera of Collider said the character remains an incomparable heroine 20 years after the show aired. Rosie Knight, author of Fierce Heroines: Inspiring Female Characters in Pop Culture (2020), said that despite originally airing in 2002, the character's legacy as a strong heroine has not waned since the show ended. TheWrap's Katie Campione said the series "turned the damsel in distress trope on its head, putting a heroine on the small screen at a time when most of the world-saving characters we knew were men (and they still are)". Collier Jennings of Collider credits the character's immediate success and popularity with "spark[ing] a trend of female-led action cartoons". According to Kelly Schremph of Romper, Kim "proved girls not only can run the world, but they can also save the world on a daily basis — all while attending high school", writing, "her character defied any stereotypical notions of what being a teen girl was 'supposed' to be like".

In 2018, Schremph remarked that the equal representation and female empowerment demonstrated by the character remains essential when internet trolls continue to criticize female-lead projects. In 2018, Adam Bonnett, executive vice president of original programming for Disney Channels Worldwide, congratulated Schooley and McCorkle for "creat[ing] an enduring character" in whom children from "all over the world found a friend". In an article titled "Why Kim Possible Was (and Will Forever Be) the Best Disney Character", Emily Leto of Her Campus thanked the show's creators and writers "for bringing such a strong, confident and perfectly-imperfect female hero into my childhood". According to Catherine Santino of People, the character is one of Disney Channel's most iconic. TVLine ranked Kim the 23rd best Disney character. In 2017, Time declared her one of the "26 Most Brilliant Female Cartoon Characters". In its ranking of "30 famous female cartoon characters of all time", Tuko.co.ke placed her fourth, calling her "one of the hottest female cartoon characters".

MTV's Deepa Lakshmin predicted that Kim "will live on in our hearts forever". UGO placed Kim 59th on the website's 75 "hottest" animated characters ranking, calling her their "Disney Channel queen", and People ranked her among "The World's Most Beautiful Cartoon Characters". Some publications also regard Kim as a fashion trendsetter, with Charmaine Simmons of Bustle crediting her with popularizing crop tops, cargo pants and bodysuits. Also writing for Bustle, Sarah Freymiller called it "refreshing to see a girl decked out in functional black and army green attire" for much of the series. Fahey said Kim "rocked the hell out of her signature black crop top and loose cargo pants way before they were ever in style". Samantha Sutton of InStyle declared Kim fashion's "unexpected muse" of spring 2023, and reported that "the Kim Possible outfit has really made a comeback" by September 2024. Eva Thomas from the same publication called them "a pinnacle piece of Kim Possible's wardrobe". Model Hailey Bieber dressed as Kim for Halloween 2024. Upon Apple's release of the Apple Watch, several critics drew similarities between the real-life device and the Kimmunicator. McCorkle cited Kim as an inspiration on Honey Lemon and Go Go Tomago, characters they adapted for Big Hero 6: The Series.

=== In other media ===
Sadie Stanley as Kim Possible in the 2019 live-action television film adaptation of the animated series.

In 2019, Sadie Stanley played Kim in Disney Channel's live-action film adaptation of the series. The project was announced at the end of Disney Channel's panel at San Diego Comic-Con 2018, which was also the character's first appearance at the convention. To prepare for the role, Stanley watched virtually every episode of Kim Possible, and underwent an intense training regimen to perform her fight scenes. She also studied Taekwondo and hand-to-hand combat. Stanley felt the film uncovers a more vulnerable version of Kim unexplored in the series, in which she is more "put together" by comparison. Some fans of the show reacted negatively to Stanley's casting because the actress didn't align with whom they had envisioned for the role. Romano has a cameo in the film as new character Poppy Blue, a pop singer who provides Kim with transportation for one of her missions. The character herself is a reference to early Kim Possible episodes where she would source rides from friends and clients due to lacking her own driver's license.

In 2019, Romano and Friedle recreated a scene from Kim Possible using previously unopened vintage action figures of their characters on Romano's YouTube cooking series Christy's Kitchen Throwback. In 2022, both Romano and Friedle were presented with their characters' collectible action figures on Good Morning America, to commemorate the show's 20th anniversary. Although the show has yet to be officially revived, in 2022 Romano and Friedle voiced their characters in an unofficial reunion episode of the show that aired on their podcast I Hear Voices. Fans often dress as the character at conventions, particularly children. In 2023, Romano revealed that Disney did not allow the cast to attend fan conventions when the show was first airing until such events and fan engagement became more mainstream.

The character's likeness has been used in a large assortment of merchandise, including action figures and Happy Meal toys. She has appeared as a player character throughout the Kim Possible video game series, including Kim Possible 2: Drakken's Demise (2004), Kim Possible: Kimmunicator (2005), Kim Possible: What's the Switch? (2006), and Kim Possible: Global Gemini (2007), in which Jack DeVries said the character "does everything with flair and style". Noting that Drakken's Demise focuses more on the character's gymnastics than her combat, Nix of IGN praised her movement for maintaining "all of the fluidity of the TV series". In What's the Switch, Kim works with Shego to retrieve and reverse the effects of a monkey-shaped relic that has swapped the brains of Ron and Drakken, with players alternating between the two women.

A stop-motion version of Kim appears in an episode of Robot Chicken where she is trapped by Kim Jong-un while trying to stop North Korean nuclear launch codes, and they both mock their names by making puns out of them. She is voiced by Rachael MacFarlane in the episode. Also, the title name in the skit is called "Mission Kim Possible", a parody and allusion of Kim Possible and Mission: Impossible.
