= Kim Possible (film) =

2019 Disney Channel original movie

- Promotional poster
- Genre: Comedy; Action-adventure
- Based on: Kim Possible by: Bob Schooley; Mark McCorkle
- Written by: Josh A. Cagan; Bob Schooley; Mark McCorkle
- Directed by: Adam Stein; Zach Lipovsky
- Starring: Sadie Stanley; Sean Giambrone; Ciara Riley Wilson
- Opening theme: "Call Me, Beep Me!" performed by Sadie Stanley
- Ending theme: "Call Me, Beep Me!" sung by Sadie Stanley
- Composer: Jim Dooley
- Country of origin: United States
- Original language: English

Production
- Executive producers: Bob Schooley; Mark McCorkle; Zanne Devine
- Producers: Mandy Spencer-Phillips; Bridget Hill
- Cinematography: Christopher Baffa
- Editor: Sabrina Pitre
- Running time: 86 minutes
- Production companies: Middleton Productions; Omnifilm Entertainment

Original release
- Network: Disney Channel
- Release: February 15, 2019

Related
- Kim Possible (2002–07)

Kim Possible is a 2019 American action comedy television film that premiered as a Disney Channel Original Movie on Disney Channel on February 15, 2019. It also aired for a marathon on Disney XD the same month as promotional material. Loosely based on the 2002–2007 animated series of the same name created by Mark McCorkle and Bob Schooley, the film stars Sadie Stanley, Sean Giambrone, and Ciara Riley Wilson.

== Plot ==
In Europe, American high school students and crimefighters Kim Possible and Ron Stoppable have thwarted a world dominating scheme of Professor Dementor and rescued Dr. Glopman, whom Dementor had kidnapped.

As Kim and Ron start their first day of school, they meet a new student named Athena and take her on a mission to stop the plot of the evil Dr. Drakken. Athena (a skilled bōjutsuka) defeats Drakken's henchwoman Shego, making her the topic of conversation at Middleton High School despite Kim's jealousy. When the school honors Athena and her good deed, Shego and Drakken force their way into the ceremony. Kim tries to defeat Shego and her army of henchwomen but falls to the ground, leaving Athena vulnerable to kidnap. Athena is kidnapped, and Kim is laughed at. After Kim talks with her family and Ron, they decide to rescue Athena from Drakken's and Shego's lair.

At the lair, Kim discovers Athena is part of Drakken's and Shego's plan to steal Kim's motivational essence and transfer it into Drakken with his brain-modulating device. Athena is revealed to be an android built by Drakken, specifically for this. As Kim short-circuits the transfer machine, Drakken is de-aged into a pre-adolescent version of himself. Despite Kim's insistence that she save herself, Athena stays behind to turn off the now-unstable machine. The lair explodes and Athena is presumed killed, but it is revealed that she has survived the explosion. Kim and Ron take her home to be repaired and programmed to be a hero alongside themselves.

During the credits, Drakken, posing as a gifted student with Shego posing as his mother, enrolls at Kim's school and begins his plan to defeat her.

== Cast ==
- Sadie Stanley as Kim Possible
- Sean Giambrone as Ron Stoppable, Kim's best friend and sidekick.
- Ciara Riley Wilson as Athena, a new student and bōjutsu practitioner at Kim's school.
- Taylor Ortega as Shego, Drakken's flame-fisted accomplice.
- Connie Ray as Nana Possible, Kim's grandmother.
- Issac Ryan Brown as Wade, a teenage computer genius and inventor.
- Erika Tham as Bonnie Rockwaller, Kim's enemy since childhood.
- Todd Stashwick as Drakken, a mad scientist and Kim's archenemy.
  - Maxwell Simkins as Young Drakken
- Alyson Hannigan as Dr. Ann Possible, Kim's neurosurgeon mother.
- Matthew Clarke as James Timothy Possible, Kim's rocket scientist father.
- Owen Fielding as Tim Possible, Kim's younger brother.
- Connor Fielding as Jim Possible, Kim's younger brother.
- Michael P. Northey as Mr. Barkin, Kim and Ron's teacher.
- Patrick Sabongui as Dr. Glopman, a scientist captured by Professor Dementor.
- Cedric Ducharme as Cool Todd
- Christy Carlson Romano as Poppy Blu, a pop star. Romano was the original voice of Kim in the animated series.
- Nancy Cartwright as Rufus, Ron's pet naked mole-rat. Cartwright reprises her role from the animated series.
- Patton Oswalt as Professor Dementor, a mad scientist. Oswalt also reprises his role from the animated series.

== Production ==
=== Development ===
In between working on the first and second seasons of the Kim Possible animated series, series creators Bob Schooley and Mark McCorkle had begun writing a script for a live-action film adaptation, which never came to fruition for unknown reasons.

On February 7, 2018, it was announced that a live-action film based on the animated series was in production at Disney Channel. McCorkle and Schooley served as executive producers, as did Josh A. Cagan, Zanne Devine, Adam Stein, and Zach Lipovsky. On April 25, 2018, it was announced that the film would go into production in mid-2018 for a 2019 premiere. The film is a production of Middleton Productions. On December 7, 2018, it was announced that the film would premiere on Disney Channel and DisneyNOW on February 15, 2019.

=== Casting ===
On April 25, 2018, Sadie Stanley and Sean Giambrone were cast in the film. On May 25, 2018, it was announced that Alyson Hannigan, Connie Ray, Todd Stashwick, Taylor Ortega, Ciara Wilson, and Erika Tham were cast in the film. On June 22, 2018, it was announced that Raven's Home star Issac Ryan Brown was cast in the film. On August 11, 2018, it was announced that Christy Carlson Romano and Patton Oswalt were cast in the film. On January 14, 2019, it was announced that Nancy Cartwright was cast in the film.

=== Filming ===
Principal photography began on June 4, 2018, and wrapped on July 23, 2018.

It was filmed in Vancouver British Columbia, in Richmond at McMath Secondary School, and at the Cleveland Dam in North Vancouver.

== Reception ==
=== Ratings ===
During its premiere in the 8:00 pm time slot, Kim Possible attracted 1.24 million viewers with a 0.22 rating for people aged 18–49, making it the lowest-rated Disney Channel Original Movie premiere of the last decade until 2021's Disney Channel Original Movie, Under Wraps.

=== Critical response ===
On the review aggregator website Rotten Tomatoes, 100% of 7 critics' reviews are positive, with an average rating of 7.5/10.

Brian Lowry of CNN wrote: "It's all a good deal of fun, bringing the animated show to life while riffing on those conventions. That said, the tone can be a bit uneven, with Stanley nicely turning Kim into a flesh-and-blood girl, while Giambrone's Ron is played much closer to the cartoon version." Petrana Radulovic of Polygon said that the film "keeps the true spirit of the DCOMs many of us grew up with — Wendy Wu: Homecoming Warrior, Halloweentown and Zenon: Girl of the 21st Century among them", and added: "Kim Possible is campy and hammers in its message with the subtlety of a sledgehammer, but that's not a critique. It just means that Kim Possible is, like most in the DCOM canon, a fun movie, and little else."

=== Accolades ===
Sabrina Pitre was nominated at the 2020 Canadian Cinema Editors Awards in the category Best Editing in Family - Series or MOW, Live Action for her work on this film.

== Miniseries ==
The film was followed by the miniseries Kim Hushable which aired between June 5 and 24, 2019. The shorts take place after the movie and focus on Kim, Ron, and Athena as they help out in a library during spring break, all while dealing with various rogues and impressing Mr. Dewey. Warhok and Warmonga, who appeared in the original series, make an appearance in the shorts.
