= Kim Possible Movie: So the Drama =

2005 Disney Channel Original Movie directed by Steve Loter

- Promotional poster
- Also known as: Disney's Kim Possible Movie: So the Drama
- Genre: Comedy; Action; Adventure
- Based on: Kim Possible by: Bob Schooley; Mark McCorkle
- Written by: Bob Schooley; Mark McCorkle
- Directed by: Steve Loter
- Voices of: Christy Carlson Romano; Will Friedle; Nancy Cartwright; Tahj Mowry; Raven-Symoné; Gary Cole; Jean Smart; Shaun Fleming; John DiMaggio; Nicole Sullivan; Ricky Ullman
- Theme music composer: Adam Berry
- Country of origin: United States
- Original language: English

Production
- Executive producers: Mark McCorkle; Bob Schooley
- Producer: Steve Loter
- Editor: Joseph Molinari
- Running time: 71 minutes
- Production company: Walt Disney Television Animation

Original release
- Network: Disney Channel
- Release: April 8, 2005

Related
- A Sitch in Time

Disney's Kim Possible Movie: So the Drama (also known as Kim Possible Movie: So the Drama or Kim Possible: Day of the Diablos in the working title) is a 2005 American romantic action comedy television film released as a Disney Channel Original Movie. It is the second TV film based on the animated television series Kim Possible. It is produced by Walt Disney Television Animation. This film includes a mix of hand-drawn animation and computer animation. The film premiered April 8, 2005 on Disney Channel and on April 11, 2005, on Toon Disney. It was the first animated Disney Channel Original Movie. This film was aired before the last few episodes of the series' third season but is considered the three-part season three finale.

The film was originally intended to be the series finale, but Disney Channel ultimately renewed the series, and the 22-episode fourth season of Kim Possible premiered on February 10, 2007, with events of the series continuing after the movie itself. The film also features Christy Carlson Romano's single "Could It Be", while it features a plot similar to the first aired episode of the series, "Crush".

== Plot ==
Dr. Drakken has been developing a new and elaborate master plan to take over the world. Among the plan's stages are the procurement of a new toy design stolen from Japanese developer Nakasumi, the creation of synthodrone androids, and a research project investigating the lifestyle of teenage girls.

Meanwhile, Kim Possible realizes that her crime-fighting career has left her with only Ron Stoppable as a potential date for the junior prom, much to her distress. Ron introduces Kim to a new student named Eric, and they soon become a couple, causing a jealous Ron to find himself edged out of Kim's life. Ron also begins to notice numerous annoying changes at his favorite restaurant Bueno Nacho.

Drakken kidnaps Kim's father James, who possesses the most advanced cybertronic technology in existence, which can fix, modify, or enlarge any machine. Kim and Ron rescue James, unaware that Drakken has already obtained his knowledge in cybertronics by tapping his brain. Bueno Nacho introduces their first kiddie meals, which come with toy robot figures called "Lil' Diablos" (based on Nakasumi's design) that become vastly popular worldwide. Kim realizes Ron's growing unhappiness and talks with him, promising that her new relationship with Eric will not affect their friendship. While Kim and Eric attend prom together, Ron, depressed and conflicted by his changing feelings for Kim, becomes upset again by Bueno Nacho and makes a call complaining to the new owner, who is revealed to be Drakken. Lars, who happens to be Bueno Nacho's new manager and one of Drakken's goons, activates the Diablo army of toys which pursue Ron and his pet mole-rat Rufus.

Escaping the Diablos, Ron bursts into the prom to warn Kim about the toys. Kim contacts her assistant Wade, who confirms that the Diablos are made from James' technology. In retaliation, Drakken attacks Middleton, transforming the toys into large, deadly robots with a command signal at Bueno Nacho. With help from the Possible family, Kim and Ron destroy the command signal, disabling the Diablos. Drakken shows Kim that his sidekick Shego has kidnapped Eric after she left the prom dance, and demands her surrender in exchange for Eric's safety.

Kim dons a new experimental battle suit created by Wade and, together with Ron and Rufus, head to Bueno Nacho headquarters, where Drakken and his forces are operating from. Kim fights and defeats Shego, but Eric electrocutes Kim unconscious, revealing himself to be a synthodrone built by Drakken. Shego also recuperates and knocks Ron unconscious before having him and Kim detained. It turns out that Drakken deduced Kim's insecurities of developing relationships with teenage boys, which explains his research on teenage girls and that he created Eric to distract Kim from his plans.

Having succeeded in outwitting Kim and Ron, Drakken launches a worldwide attack with the giant Diablo robots at midnight. Embarrassed and distressed by Eric's betrayal, Kim is about to give up, but Ron encourages her by finally confessing his feelings for her, which she accepts. Rufus helps Kim and Ron escape and they head to Bueno Nacho's roof to destroy the tower controlling the Diablos with an EMP. Shego and Eric intervene, but Kim fires the EMP at the tower. Eric catches it just in time, but Rufus destroys him by puncturing his foot, draining all his cyber liquid and making him drop the EMP on the tower, shutting down all the robots and returning them to their normal sizes. Drakken, Shego and their cohorts end up being arrested while Kim and Ron are hailed as heroes for saving the world once again. They return to prom holding hands, where students (except for Bonnie Rockwaller) cheer them as they dance and share their first kiss as a couple.

== Cast ==
- Christy Carlson Romano as Kimberly Ann "Kim" Possible
- Will Friedle as Ronald "Ron" Stoppable
- Nancy Cartwright as Rufus
- Tahj Mowry as Wade Load
- John DiMaggio as Dr. Drakken (Drew Theodore P. Lipsky)
- Nicole Sullivan as Shego
- Ricky Ullman as Eric
- Gary Cole as Dr. James Timothy Possible
- Jean Smart as Dr. Ann Possible
- Shaun Fleming as Jim and Tim Possible
- Raven-Symoné as Monique
- Kirsten Storms as Bonnie Rockwaller
- Rider Strong as Brick Flagg
- Diedrich Bader as Lars
- Eddie Deezen as Ned
- Clyde Kusatsu as Nakasumi
- Lauren Tom as Miss Kyoko
- Kevin Michael Richardson as Sumo Ninja / Dr. Gooberman
- Maurice LaMarche as Big Daddy Brotherson
- Tara Strong as Dr. Possible's voice command
- April Winchell as Reporter

== Reception ==
In its premiere night, the film received a 3.6 household rating - about 3.1 million viewers.

== Home media ==
An extended version of the film was released on May 10, 2005. It featured Christy Carlson Romano's music video "Could It Be" and a never-before-seen episode of Kim Possible "Gorilla Fist."

As of November 12, 2019, it is available to stream on Disney+.
