= List of Kim Possible characters =

Fictional character

From left to right: Wade (on monitor screen), James Possible, Ann Possible, Ron Stoppable, Rufus, Kim Possible, Shego, Doctor Drakken, Monkey Fist, Señor Senior Sr., Adrena Lynn, and Señor Senior Jr.

This is a list of characters appearing in the animated series Kim Possible and related media.

== Overview ==
Character	Voiced by	Animation							Live-action	
Character	Voiced by	Seasons					Films			Kim Hushable
Character	Voiced by	1	2	3	Crossover	4	A Sitch in Time	So the Drama	Kim Possible	Kim Hushable
Character	Voiced by	2002–2003	2003–2004	2004–2006	2005	2007	2003	2005	2019	
=== Team Possible ===
Kimberly Ann "Kim" Possible	Christy Carlson Romano (Note: Voiced by Dakota Fanning as a child, and portrayed by Sadie Stanley in live-action.)	Main	Main	Main	Main	Main	Main	Main	Main	Main
Ronald "Ron" Stoppable	Will Friedle (Note: Voiced by Harrison Fahn as a child, and portrayed by Sean Giambrone in live-action.)	Main	Main	Main	Main	Main	Main	Main	Main	Main
Rufus	Nancy Cartwright (Note: Voiced by Michael Dorn as Rufus 3000.) (Note: Voiced by Vincent Martella in Chibiverse.)	Main	Main	Main	Main	Main	Main	Main	Main	Main
Wade	Tahj Mowry (Note: Voiced by Michael Clarke Duncan as an adult, and portrayed by Issac Ryan Brown in live-action.)	Main	Main	Main	Main	Main	Main	Main	Main	Main
Athena	(Note: Portrayed by Ciara Riley Wilson in live-action.)								Main	Main
=== The Possibles ===
Dr. James Timothy Possible	Gary Cole (Note: Portrayed by Matthew Clarke in live-action, Unnamed in dialogue, and credits)	Main	Main	Main	Main	Main	Main	Main	Main	
Dr. Ann Possible	Jean Smart (Note: Portrayed by Alyson Hannigan in live-action, Unnamed in dialog and credits.)	Main	Main	Main	Main	Main	Main	Main	Main	
Jim Possible	Shaun Fleming (2002–2006); Spencer Fox (2007) (Note: Voiced by Freddie Prinze Jr. as an adult, and portrayed by Owen Fielding in live-action.)	Main	Main	Main	Main	Main	Main	Main	Main	
Tim Possible	Shaun Fleming (2002–2006); Spencer Fox (2007) (Note: Voiced by Freddie Prinze Jr. as an adult, and portrayed by Connor Fielding in live-action.)	Main	Main	Main	Main	Main	Main	Main	Main	
Nana Possible	Debbie Reynolds (Note: Portrayed by Connie Ray in live-action.)		Guest			Guest			Main	
=== Main villains ===
Dr. Drakken (né Lipsky)	John DiMaggio (Note: Portrayed by Todd Stashwick in live-action, and by Maxwell Simkins as a teenager.)	Main	Main	Main	Main	Main	Main	Main	Main	Recurring
Shego	Nicole Sullivan (Note: Portrayed by Taylor Ortega in live-action.)	Main	Main	Main	Main	Main	Main	Main	Main	
Monkey Fist (Lord Monty Fiske)	Tom Kane	Recurring	Recurring	Recurring		Recurring	Main			
Duff Killigan	Brian George	Recurring	Recurring	Guest		Recurring	Main			
Eric	Ricky Ullman							Main		

== Team Possible ==
- Kim Possible (voiced by Christy Carlson Romano in the series, Dakota Fanning as a child; portrayed by Sadie Stanley in the live-action film) is a teenage girl who fights crime and saves the world on a regular basis while at the same time dealing with the normal challenges of being a teenager, such as winning cheerleading competitions, turning in her homework on time, and maintaining a love life. She has liked and known Ron Stoppable, her sidekick, since preschool, but has completed missions with Wade, Monique, her brothers, and her mother. In So The Drama and season four, Kim and Ron develop romantic feelings for each other and begin dating during their senior year. She has a fiery and headstrong personality, yet uses her intelligence and sensibility to 'save the day'. Though she struggles with her rivalry with Bonnie and shyness around her crushes, she often acts maturely and as Ron's conscience. She has a good relationship with her family members, despite often being annoyed by her brothers and embarrassed by her parents' antics. Her name is a play on the word "impossible."
- Ron Stoppable (voiced by Will Friedle in the series, Harrison Fahn as a child; portrayed by Sean Giambrone in the live-action film) is a cowardly, clumsy, and accident-prone teenage boy who has been best friends with Kim since preschool. He serves as her sidekick during missions, but has saved the world on his own. He owns a pet naked mole-rat named Rufus who is best friends with him and Kim and often helps them on missions. In interviews, co-creators Bob Schooley and Mark McCorkle summed up Ron's role as comic relief until the finale as "He can't do anything." He is not as popular as Kim at school and is often ridiculed and ignored by his peers. However, he joins the football team during his senior year, having previously served as team mascot, and is given the nickname of "Unstoppable Stoppable". He has an adopted younger sister from Japan named Hana, who has mystical abilities of her own. Early in the series, Ron gains the Mystical Monkey Powers while battling Lord Monkey Fist, using a series of ancient totems. Ron's control over the powers is shown as intermittent at best with Ron's Mystical Monkey Powers usually emerging in short bursts. Ron having these powers grants him the ability to wield the mystical Lotus Blade and according to an ancient prophecy, he is to be the Ultimate Monkey Master.
- Rufus (voiced by Nancy Cartwright) is Ron's pet naked mole-rat, who often accompanies him on missions and whose small size and agility often prove useful. Because of allergies, Ron's father would not allow him to have a pet with hair, so around sixth grade, he bought Rufus from a Smarty Mart. Rufus's future descendant, Rufus 3000, appears in A Sitch in Time, voiced by Michael Dorn. He is capable of speech and refers to himself as Rufus 3000 because he is the 3000th version made of the original "Rufus Prime".
- Wade Load (voiced by Tahj Mowry in the series, portrayed by Issac Ryan Brown in the live-action film) is a 10-year-old genius who is skilled at programming and runs Kim Possible's website. He relays information and missions to her through her "Kimmunicator," supplies her with various gadgets, and arranges her transportation. An alternate future version of Wade appears in A Sitch in Time, voiced by Michael Clarke Duncan.
- Athena (portrayed by Ciara Wilson) is an android who Dr. Drakken created to infiltrate Kim and Ron's lives. While battling Kim, Athena stays behind to turn off Drakken's now-unstable machine. The lair explodes and Athena is presumed killed, but it is revealed that she has survived the explosion. Kim and Ron take her home to be repaired and programmed to be a hero Athena was created for the 2019 live-action film Kim Possible.

== Middleton High students and staff ==
- Bonnie Rockwaller (voiced by Kirsten Storms in the series, portrayed by Erika Tham in the live-action film) is Kim's classmate and rival at Middleton High School. She is concerned with the high school's "food chain", and sees Kim's popularity and position as cheerleading captain as a threat to her position. In addition to hanging out with the popular seniors, she has an on-again, off-again relationship with the football team's star quarterback, Brick Flagg, who she dates for his status. She later dates Hirotaka and then Señor Senior Junior, who is her boyfriend for the remainder of the series. An alternate future version of Bonnie appears in A Sitch in Time, voiced by Kelly Ripa. Despite her stereotypical mean girl attitude, she does not shy away from academics, as she took an interest in medicine when she trained under Kim's mother Anna Possible, who was a Neurosurgeon.
- Steven Barkin (voiced by Patrick Warburton in the series, portrayed by Michael Northey in the live-action film) is a teacher and chaperone at Middleton High. He is the subject of a running gag where he is the substitute teacher for many subjects, even those he is unfamiliar with.
- Monique (voiced by Raven-Symoné) is a close friend of Kim who gives her advice and serves as a counterbalance to Ron's eccentricities. Despite lacking fighting skills, she sometimes assists Kim on her missions and helps design her new uniform. An alternate future version of Monique appears in A Sitch in Time, voiced by Vivica A. Fox.
- Brick Flagg (voiced by Rider Strong) is the star quarterback of the Middleton High School football team. Despite being the stereotypical "dumb jock", he is a nice guy who rarely picks fights with others. Bonnie Rockwaller is his on-again, off-again girlfriend for most of the second and third seasons. His love interests during their off- periods include Kim, Amelia, and Monique, the latter briefly reciprocating his love in So the Drama. However, in "Homecoming Upset", it is revealed he dumped Bonnie before graduating. An alternate future version of Brick makes a cameo appearance in A Sitch in Time as one of Shego's slaves.
- Josh Mankey (voiced by Breckin Meyer in his first appearance, A. J. Trauth thereafter) is Kim's former love interest and crush, who Ron dislikes since his last name is similar to the word monkey and is jealous of because of Kim's crush. He has an easygoing and laid-back personality and is an artist and musician, and therefore is popular among the students. In season three, it is revealed that Josh and Kim separated, and he is seen with Tara for some time.
- Felix Renton (voiced by Jason Marsden) is Ron's friend, an easygoing boy who enjoys video games and basketball despite being paralyzed from the waist down. His mother, a roboticist at the Middleton space center, built an advanced wheelchair for him that is capable of flight.

== Family members ==
=== The Possibles ===
- James Timothy Possible (voiced by Gary Cole in the series, portrayed by Matthew Clarke in the live-action film) is Kim, Jim, and Tim's father, and an astrophysicist and rocket scientist. The fourth season reveals him to be a graduate of the Middleton Institute of Science and Technology (MIST).
- Ann Possible (voiced by Jean Smart in the series, portrayed by Alyson Hannigan in the live-action film) is Kim, Jim, and Tim's mother, who is a caring and understanding mother to Kim. She is a neurosurgeon and is usually referred to as a brain surgeon in the series. She is the subject of a running gag in which when Kim calls her for advice, she is currently performing a surgery.
- Jim and Tim Possible (voiced initially by Shaun Fleming, later by Spencer Fox; portrayed by Owen and Connor Fielding in the live-action film) are Kim's two younger brothers, who often annoy her; she often refers to them as "tweebs" (twin dweebs). They are named after their father. Because of their youth at the beginning of the series, they often do not consider the consequences of their actions, such as being injured after trying to imitate one of Adrena Lynn's extreme stunts. Their catchphrase is in the twinspeak language they invented, with one saying "Hicka-bicka-boo", followed by the response "Hooo-Sha". Throughout the series, they display a talent for inventing and often use Kim's stuff to create their own inventions, and also help her fix and upgrade the beat-up car her dad gave her. Despite their obvious intellect, Kim has trouble seeing them as anything more than annoying goof-offs and believes them incapable of some accomplishments. Alternate future versions of Jim and Tim appear in A Sitch in Time, voiced by Freddie Prinze Jr.
- Nana Possible (voiced by Debbie Reynolds in the series, portrayed by Connie Ray in the live-action film) is Kim, Jim, Tim, and Joss's paternal grandmother and Larry's maternal grandmother. She previously trained in "Pang Lang Quan Kung Fu" in a Shaolin Monastery and participated in the Vietnam War when she was a teenager.
- Larry (voiced by Brian Posehn) is Kim, Jim, and Tim's cousin and Ron's friend. He is an avid computer geek and loves video games, and has a slight crush on Bonnie, who he compares to the Queen in one of his games.
- June (voiced by Mary Jo Catlett) is Kim, Jim, and Tim's aunt and Larry's mother. She loves her son, but seemingly does not understand his interests. When she witnesses villains fighting, she fails to comprehend what is happening.
- Joss Possible (voiced by Tara Strong) is Kim's paternal cousin and the daughter of "Slim" Possible. Initially, she goes overboard with worshipping Kim, causing her to feel uncomfortable around her. However, by the end of Kim's visit to the Lazy C Ranch, Joss shifts her focus onto Ron, having recognized the true value of courage, as he heads into dangerous situations despite his fear.
- "Slim" Possible (voiced by Kevin Michael Richardson) is James Possible's older brother, Joss's father, and Kim, Jim, and Tim's uncle. He owns the Lazy C Ranch in Montana, which has robotic horses instead of normal livestock.

=== The Stoppables ===
- Mr. Stoppable (voiced by Elliott Gould) is Ron's father, who works as an actuary. Because of his allergy to pet fur, Ron was not allowed to have a pet until he bought Rufus.
- Mrs. Stoppable (voiced by Andrea Martin) is Ron's mother, who seems to have a distant relationship with him. Her job is unknown, but it is shown in A Sitch in Time that she had to relocate to Norway to be closer to the home office.
- Hana Stoppable (voiced by Grey DeLisle) is Ron's adoptive baby sister, who originates from Japan and had her adoption brokered by the Yamanouchi clan. At first Ron is resentful of Hana and how his parents sprung her on him as a surprise, before discovering she is a prophesied weapon called the Han. Her mystical and martial arts skills grow until she finally defeats Yono the Destroyer.
- Shaun (voiced by Tara Strong) is Ron's seven-year-old cousin, who often causes trouble for Ron at family events.
- Reuben Stoppable is Ron's cousin, who appears as a bridegroom in the episode "Bad Boy".

=== Other ===
- Miriam Possible and Jonathan Stoppable are Kim and Ron's possible ancestors, who appear in a shared dream sequence. The two met and became friends at the World's Fair, during which Miriam's Electro-Static Illuminator was stolen by the ancestors of Shego and Dr. Drakken, Miss Go and Bartholomew Lipsky.
- Wade's Mother (voiced by Roz Ryan) is Wade's unnamed mother, who appears sporadically throughout the series. In the episode "Mother's Day", Wade has a celebration with his mother in his room, with takeout and a holographic beach.
- Connie and Lonnie Rockwaller (respectively voiced by Jennifer Hale and Grey DeLisle) are Bonnie Rockwaller's two older sisters, who are first alluded to in "Hidden Talent" when Bonnie mentions them having won the Middleton High talent show the previous four years in a row. They make their first physical appearance in "Bonding", where it is implied that Bonnie's attitude may stem from their treatment of her.

== Allies ==
=== Global Justice ===
- Dr. Betty Director (voiced by Felicity Huffman) is the head of the Global Justice Network, a worldwide espionage organization. She stays behind the scenes for the most part, although Kim has other dealings with Global Justice, usually in the form of rides to her destinations and backup on missions. Director's role and appearance are reminiscent of Marvel Comics character Nick Fury.
- Team Impossible are a group of operatives who initially only operate for money, charging money to anyone they save. Wade later convinces them to join Global Justice and operate for non-profit. They consist of Dash (voiced by Gary Dourdan), Crash (voiced by Eric Close), and Burn (voiced by Adam Rodriguez).
- Will Du (voiced by BD Wong) is a top agent at Global Justice. He initially clashes with Kim before working with her to stop Duff Killigan.

=== Yamanouchi ===
Yamanouchi is a secret ninja school, located atop a mountain in Japan. It was founded by Toshimiru, a master of Monkey Kung Fu. He carved the school out of the mountain using a sword called the Lotus Blade. Since its creation in 338 AD, the school has guarded the blade, which can only be used by those who possess Mystical Monkey Power.

- Master Sensei (voiced by George Takei) is a martial artist and the headmaster of the Yamanouchi school. He guides Ron in mastering his Mystical Monkey Powers and becoming the Ultimate Monkey Master.
- Yori (voiced by Keiko Agena) is a ninja who is sent to guide Ron to the Yamanouchi School. Since her introduction, she has appeared as a potential love interest for Ron, piquing his romantic interest at first sight and gradually developing feelings for him.

=== Team Go ===
Team Go are a sibling team who protect Go City and obtained superpowers after a multicolored comet crashed into their tree house when they were young. Shego was originally a member of the team before leaving. They are each themed after a specific color and are named after pronouns, with "go" added at the end. Hego is blue, Mego is purple, the Wego twins are red, and Shego is green.

- Hego (voiced by Christopher McDonald) is the oldest member of Team Go, who possesses superhuman strength. As a civilian, he manages a Bueno Nacho. Hego sincerely believes that despite her actions, Shego is still a good person, only to be proven wrong when she betrays and blasts him. It is such behavior that seems to make Hego the brother Shego is most annoyed by.
- Mego (voiced by Jere Burns) is a member of Team Go who can shrink to the size of a doll. He possesses a large ego and is defensive of his seemingly useless power.
- The Wego twins (voiced by Fred Savage) are twin members of Team Go who can duplicate themselves.

=== Others ===
- Amelia (voiced by Carly Pope, later Tara Strong) is a senior who is implied to be the school's beauty queen, and presumably graduates after season two. She constantly brushes off Ron's attempts at flirting, but welcomes him into her popular circle during the episodes "All the News" and "The New Ron", and accepts money from him in "Ron Millionaire".
- Britina (voiced by Tara Strong) is a teen musician who has her own line of merchandise, including a magazine and dolls. Like most pop singers, she is fodder for tabloids and is notable for her relationships; she dated Oh Boyz singer Nicky Nick, but they have since broken up. Her name is an allusion to Britney Spears and Christina Aguilera.
- Bobo the Chimpanzee is Camp Wannaweep's mascot. He is only seen in flashbacks describing Ron's unpleasant experiences at the camp.
- Doctor Cyrus Bortel (voiced by Enrico Colantoni) is a selfish inventor who developed the Moodulators and Mind Control Chips.
- Doctor Vivian Porter (voiced by Shawnee Smith) is a roboticist who created the android Oliver, among other inventions. James Possible later offers her a job at the Middleton Space Center's robotics lab.
- Elsa Cleeg (voiced by Wendie Malick) is a famous fashion critic with her own television fashion report program, which Monique is a fan of. She is an influential authority on fashion, even influencing Club Banana. She was inspired by the aesthetics of Kim's mission clothes to create the "KimStyle", which became a nationwide clothing sensation, including spin-off clothing lines "KimForHim" and one for pets.
- François (voiced by Rob Paulsen) is a French hairstylist who styles Ron's hair in "The New Ron". He later appears in "Rufus in Show", when he lends Kim and Ron his prize-winning pedigree poodle when they need to infiltrate an exclusive dog show, and in "Two to Tutor" as one of the targets of a string of heists committed by Shego and Señor Senior Junior.
- Hirotaka (voiced by Brian Tochi) is a Japanese student who appears in the episode "Exchange" as a participant in the titular exchange program.
- Linda (voiced by various actresses) is a Middleton High School student with auburn-brown hair who wears a blue sweater. Her name is never mentioned in any of the episodes, but it was shown on a yearbook photo page backdrop in a teaser ad for the series. She had speaking parts in Season One, but was then relegated to appearing only in backgrounds for the remainder of the program's run.
- M.C. Honey (voiced by Sherri Shepherd) is a rapper loosely based on female rappers like Queen Latifah and MC Lyte. She gives Kim a ride in her yacht as thanks for retrieving her demo tape when it was stolen in "Hidden Talent"'. She reappears in "Rappin' Drakken" and "Trading Faces".
- Nakasumi (voiced by Clyde Kusatsu) is an esteemed toy developer, and Miss Kyoko (voiced by Lauren Tom) is his secretary and assistant. He is the victim of theft by Drakken and Shego in "Crush", but Kim recovers what was stolen, and in return, Nakasumi gives her a ride in "A Very Possible Christmas" and So the Drama.
- Ned (voiced by Eddie Deezen) is an assistant manager at Bueno Nacho.
- Oh Boyz are a boy band consisting of Robby, Nicky Nick, Ryan, and Dexter, whose fame suddenly vanished, leaving Ron as their only fan. They are on the verge of breaking up when the Señor Seniors kidnap them to fulfill Junior's dream of becoming a pop star, inadvertently restoring their popularity. The four are respectively voiced by Lance Bass, Joey Fatone, Jason Marsden, and Justin Shenkarow.
- Pain King and Steel Toe (respectively voiced by Bill Goldberg and Test) are the star wrestlers of the GWA (Global Wrestling Association), who are rivals in the ring but friends outside it. They are distinguished by their costumes, which allude to their stage names – Pain King wears a gold coronet and mask, while Steel Toe's right shoe is supposedly made of titanium.
- Prince Wallace III "Wally" (voiced by Rob Paulsen) is the spoiled and arrogant prince of Rodeghan. Kim was charged with protecting him from the Knights of Rodeghan in "Royal Pain" because of his ancestor's tyrannical behavior toward them. Wally runs for class president against Kim and Brick Flagg, inspiring him to convert Rodeghan into a democracy.
- Private Cleotus Dobbs (voiced by Dan Castellaneta) is a private in the Army who was charged with guarding a Neutronalizer Ray. Dr. Drakken kidnaps Dobbs and switches minds with him to steal the Neutronalizer.
- Professor Acari (voiced by Maurice LaMarche) is an insectologist who invented the "roflex", a device that can enlarge insects. He is named for Acariformes, an order of mite.
- Professor Ramesh (voiced by Brian George) is an astronomer and old friend of James Possible.
- Professor Robert Chen (voiced by Gedde Watanabe) is an astronomer and old friend of James Possible and Dr. Drakken.
- Rabbi Katz (voiced by Peter Bonerz) is a rabbi who oversees Ron's bar mitzvah.
- Roachie (vocal effects provided by Frank Welker) is a cockroach who Chester Yapsby enlarges to the size of a small dog using the roflex, an invention he stole from Professor Acari. Ron befriends him despite his fear of insects.
- Tara (voiced by Tara Strong) is a cheerleader and one of Bonnie's sycophants. She has dated numerous characters, including Josh Mankey and Jason Morgan.
- Timothy North (voiced by Adam West) is a former television actor who played the role of the titular character on the TV show The Fearless Ferret. Over the years, North becomes delusional and begins to believe he is the Fearless Ferret. At a Retro-TV convention, he reunites with Rudolph Farnsworth, who played the villain White Stripe and had also become delusional. This brings the two back to reality and reunites them as friends. North's name and persona are based on West's role as Batman in the 1960s series of the same name.
- Zita Flores (voiced by Nika Futterman) is a Hispanic student at Middleton High, who works at a multiplex theater in Middleton and is usually seen in the ticket booth wearing the name tag "Annie" until hers can be made. Ron has a crush on her, and so attends every film showing to chat with her, which evidently piques her interest.

=== Rides ===
Minor characters in Kim's network whom she has helped during past missions and provide transportation to her missions. As of season four, Kim uses rides less because she has her own vehicle, but calls upon them when it is out of service.

- Baxter – In "Mind Games", he lets Kim and Ron ride two of his donkeys into the Grand Canyon in return for Kim performing an emergency delivery for his donkey Buttercup. He is voiced by Dan Castellaneta.
- Bernice – In "Naked Genius", she gives Kim a ride as thanks for saving her town from a leaking dam. She also appears in "Team Impossible", having apparently started working with jets. She is voiced by April Winchell.
- Captain Louis – In "A Very Possible Christmas", he gives Ron a ride to Dr. Drakken's base. The episode reveals that Kim saved his boat from sinking, but that Ron exacerbated the trouble, which he does not remember. He is voiced by John DiMaggio.
- Dallas – In "Attack of the Killer Bebes", he gives Kim a lift to Mount Middleton after she aids him during a car chase. He is voiced by Rob Paulsen.
- Mr. Geminini – He works for Doctor Bortle, and in "The Twin Factor" gives Kim, Ron, and her brothers a ride to Bortle's lab. He has a twin, but his brother is in prison. He is voiced by Dan Castellaneta.
- Gustavo – In "Tick-Tick-Tick", he gives Kim and Ron a ride in his plane as thanks for them saving his village from a flood, which it is hinted Ron caused.
- Heinrich – In "Crush", he gives Kim a ride after she saves his village from an avalanche that Ron accidentally caused which he still holds a grudge on him for. He reappears in "Team Impossible". He is voiced by John DiMaggio.
- Joe – A helicopter pilot who in "Queen Bebe" gives Kim and Ron a ride to the Bebe's hive island off the Gulf Coast of Florida.
- Judd – A camera man who in "Oh Boyz" gives Kim a ride to the Seniors' island. Kim had rescued Judd from a rhino stampede while he was filming a program entitled "Teasing Wild Animals".
- Mr. Magnifico – In "Bonding", he and his circus company give Kim a ride to a top-secret research facility on their train. They did this in return for Kim acting as a substitute acrobat after the original performer twisted her ankle.
- Mr. Morrow - He is voiced by Clancy Brown.
- Mrs. Mahoney – A woman who gave Kim her first ever ride as payment for saving her cat, as seen in A Sitch in Time.
- Mr. Parker – In "Bueno Nacho", he flies Kim to Wisconsin in his crop duster after she saves his business by going organic, allowing her to para-drop onto the world's largest Swiss cheese wheel.
- Ricardo – In "Gorilla Fist", he gives Kim a ride to South America in his plane as thanks for saving his chicken farm from a mudslide.
- Unnamed Marine Colonel – In "Monkey Fist Strikes", he gives Kim a ride to Cambodia in a military transport plane after she tips him off to an incoming assault.

== Main villains ==
=== Dr. Drakken ===
Drew Theodore P. Lipsky or commonly known as Dr. Drakken (voiced by John DiMaggio; portrayed by Todd Stashwick in the live-action film) is a mad scientist and Kim's archenemy. He is a capable inventor, but is clueless at making his inventions work correctly, and his plans are often undone by his own oversights.

Even though Drakken claims to be evil, at times he has shown a good side and helped Kim save the world. He frequently encounters Kim and Ron, and is always surprised to see Kim even though he is unsure why; as well, he never remembers Ron's name. However, in "The Twin Factor," he does remember his name, and Ron forces him to remember it at the end of So the Drama. In "Graduation", he plays a major role in defeating the Lorwardians and receives a UN medal for it, and he and Shego affirm their love for one another.

=== Shego ===
Shego (voiced by Nicole Sullivan; portrayed by Taylor Ortega in the live-action film) is Dr. Drakken's sidekick and Kim's most dangerous enemy. She used to be a superheroine alongside her brothers as part of Team Go, as they were hit by a mysterious rainbow "comet" when they were younger and each gained a color-coded glowing superpower; Shego is green-themed and can generate concussive energy blasts.

Initially, Shego was meant to simply be Drakken's sidekick. However, after hearing Nicole Sullivan's performance as Shego, they started to develop her relationship with Drakken, although it is only explicitly identified as a romantic one in the series finale. Sullivan portrayed Shego as sarcastic and more intelligent than Drakken, which became a major aspect of her character.

=== Monkey Fist ===
Lord Monty Fiske, better known as Monkey Fist (voiced by Tom Kane) is an English nobleman and archaeologist who trained to become a master martial artist and underwent procedures from DNAmy to replace his hands and feet with those of a monkey. He is obsessed with increasing his power through various mystical artifacts and prophecies. He is often accompanied by his highly trained Monkey Ninjas who help him in his schemes.

=== Duff Killigan ===
Duff Killigan (voiced by Brian George) is a Scottish villain and the self-proclaimed "World's Deadliest Golfer", who was banned from every golf course in the world because of his temper. He wields golf clubs and exploding golf balls. Although he debuted as an independent villain, subsequent appearances show him as more of a mercenary, committing robberies to sell stolen objects to others. Killigan resides on a private island dubbed "Killigan's Island" in a reference to Gilligan's Island.

=== The Seniors ===
- Señor Senior, Sr. (voiced by Ricardo Montalbán, later Earl Boen) is a retired Spanish multi-billionaire who takes up villainy as a hobby at Ron's suggestion. Many of his schemes revolve around acquiring power or influence for his son, Junior, and his tactics usually involve clichés of villainy such as evil laughter and elaborate traps. He is often seen reading and referencing The Book of Evil guidebook, and aims to gain control of Europe. He was an action sports icon in his youth, and has shown that he is quite skilled and spry for his age.
- Señor Senior, Jr. (voiced by Néstor Carbonell) is Senior Sr.'s son and accomplice, a spoiled man-child who is more interested in parties and beauty than his father's criminal plans and has demonstrated a soft side on various occasions. He once had a crush on Kim because of the zodiac-like principles of Animology.

=== Professor Dementor ===
Professor Dementor (voiced and portrayed by Patton Oswalt) is a German mad scientist and rival of Dr. Drakken.

=== DNAmy ===
Amy Hall or DNAmy (voiced by Melissa McCarthy) is a geneticist and an avid collector of Cuddle Buddies, which are small stuffed toys similar to Beanie Babies that are hybrids between two animals, with her favorite being the butterfly-otter hybrid Otterfly. In her obsession, she creates mutant animal hybrids which ended up getting her fired and shunned by the scientific community as her splicing experiments were deemed unethical. Amy also provided Monkey Fist with his monkey limbs.

=== Motor Ed ===
Motor Ed (voiced by John DiMaggio) is Dr. Drakken's cousin, who Mrs. Lipsky considers to be the family's "black sheep", and is known for his repetitive use of the words "Dude" and "Seriously!". He has a biker gang motif and is a male chauvinist with an eye for beautiful women.

=== Camille Léon ===
Camille Léon (voiced by Ashley Tisdale) is an heiress and socialite who became a villain after being cut off from her family fortune and gained shapeshifting abilities after having experimental plastic surgery. Her name is a play on the word "chameleon". Unlike other villains, who aim for world domination, Camille commits crimes to fund her lavish lifestyle or out of spite and revenge.

=== Frugal Lucre ===
Frugal Lucre (voiced by Richard Kind) is an employee of a Philadelphia Smarty Mart who was originally named Francis Lurman. In the episode "Low Budget", he threatens to destroy the Internet with a destructive virus unless everyone in the world agrees to pay him a dollar each. He is a cost-conscious and budget-minded villain, and so does not use henchmen or a lair. He conducts his evil plans from his mother's basement and threatens his foes with snapping turtles.

=== Eric ===
Synthodrone #901 (voiced by Raviv Ullman), also known as Eric, is an android created by Dr. Drakken to distract Kim from his plans of world domination. He is later destroyed by Rufus.

== Minor villains ==
- Adrena Lynn (voiced by Rachel Dratch) is a teen actress who specializes in "extreme" death-defying stunts, which are secretly faked. Her name is an allusion to adrenaline.
- Aviarius (voiced by Richard Steven Horvitz) is a bird-themed villain and enemy of Team Go. He wields bird-themed weapons, such as flocks of hummingbird-shaped homing missiles and a gigantic robotic flamingo. He also owned a staff which was capable of stealing the powers of Team Go for the wielder to use for themselves, though it was subsequently destroyed, returning the stolen powers to their original owners.
- Bates (voiced by Jeff Bennett) is Monkey Fist's butler, who is loyal and works hard to please him.
- The Bebes (voiced by Kerri Kenney-Silver) are a trio of robots who were created by Dr. Drakken, but later went rogue. Rufus later sabotages their production line so that their heads will be mounted upside down. In response, the Bebes self-destruct after realizing they are no longer perfect.
- "Big Daddy" Brotherson (voiced by Maurice LaMarche) is an obese information broker. He often plays mind games with his clients, which he expects them to play along with if they want his help.
- Chester Yapsby (voiced by Stephen Root) is a villain who only appears in the episode "Roachie", where he tries to take over Middleton with giant cockroaches. He is thwarted with help from Roachie, one of the giant cockroaches he created and Ron befriended.
- Dr. Fen (voiced by Tom Kenny) is a roboticist and co-worker of Dr. Possible. It is unclear how he obtained this position, but it is implied that he got it by stealing his partner's research.
- Electronique (voiced by Kari Wahlgren) is a villainess who can generate electricity and is skilled in electrical weapons. She has metallic, wire-like hair and wears an outfit with wires and conduits to channel her powers.
- The Embarrassment Ninjas are silent ninjas who Drakken employs to help him embarrass Kim while she is on a date with Josh Mankey.
- The Evil Eye Trio are consultants who advise villains on the appearance of their lairs and costumes. Their cable television show Evil Eye for the Bad Guy is a spoof of Queer Eye.
- Falsetto Jones (voiced by Phil Morris) is a wealthy man who is known for being the only breeder of the rare Lithuanian Wolfhound. He is the prime suspect in many high-profile robberies, but avoids persecution due to a lack of evidence. His nickname is derived from his unusually high voice, which he gained from a "freak helium accident".
- Fukushima (voiced by Dante Basco) is a ninja who comes into conflict with Ron when he attends the Yamanouchi school as part of an exchange program.
- Gil Moss (voiced by Justin Berfield) is a former friend of Ron who was mutated into a fish-like mutant after attending Camp Wannaweep and being exposed to its toxic waters.
- Hank Perkins (voiced by Rob Paulsen) is a temp worker who Duff Killigan hires after Dr. Drakken and Shego are incapacitated by the flu. He returns in "Odds Man In" as a "villainy consultant" to improve Drakken's latest global domination scheme.
- Jack Hench (voiced by Fred Willard) is the head of Hench Co. Industries, who prefers to think of himself as a businessman who caters to an exclusive clientele rather than a villain. However, he is linked to villainy since the clientele consists of people who do have evil schemes.
- Jackie Oakes (voiced by Bill Barretta) is the founder and chairman of the GWA (Global Wrestling Association), who made a fortune bringing his brand of sports entertainment worldwide. He intends to become a wrestler himself, but is not taken seriously because of his small size. Oakes later obtains an ancient Egyptian amulet that gives him superhuman strength. Rufus manages to remove the amulet, allowing Pain King and Steel Toe to throw Oakes out of the ring.
- Malcolm Needius (voiced by Martin Spanjers) is a 'power player' in the online game Everlot, a parody of EverQuest. However, his obsession goes too far and he seeks to dominate the game world as his online avatar – the Wraith Master.
- Nanny Maim (voiced by Jane Carr) is the former head of an English academy for nannies, which went out of business as the practice of using nannies to raise children became less fashionable. Maim develops a machine that turns people into super-strong babies and holds them for ransom.
- Sheldon Director (voiced by Maurice LaMarche) is the fraternal twin brother of Betty Director and the head of WEE (the Worldwide Evil Empire), who has dedicated himself to taking down her group Global Justice. He calls himself Gemini.
- Snowy (voiced by Phil Morris) is a toxic snowman who came to life through a freak blizzard. It is later revealed that news anchor Summer Gale (voiced by Hallie Todd) caused the blizzard using a weather machine to get more airtime, inadvertently creating Snowy since the snow was made from the mutagenic water of Lake Wannaweep. Snowy is destroyed when Kim and Ron cause the sun to come out, melting him.
- Sumo Ninja (voiced by Kevin Michael Richardson) is a ninja who has the size and weight of a sumo wrestler. He usually speaks in a deep, threatening voice. While working for Dr. Drakken, he attempts to kidnap Mr. Nakasumi, but as a result of his battle with Kim and Ron, he is left with a high, squeaky voice for some time.
- The Fashionistas are a group of fashion-obsessed criminals who are surprisingly capable at combat. They consist of Chino (voiced by Charlie Schlatter), Espadrille (voiced by Tara Strong), and Hoodie (voiced by Gwendoline Yeo).
- The Knights of Rodeghan (voiced by Corey Burton and Brian George) are a group of knights who serve Prince Wally of Rodeghan. They believe that the royal lineage will end with him, which is fulfilled when he converts Rodeghan into a democracy.
- The Mathter (voiced by Brian Stepanek) is an enemy of Team Go who became a villain after he was denied funding for his "unethical mathematical experiments". His primary weapon is a "calcu-laser" and he uses math puns in almost every sentence, much to Kim's annoyance.
- Vinnie Wheeler (voiced by Max Casella) is a man who Señor Senior Senior hires as a financial consultant to instill in his son a measure of financial responsibility. He is actually a con man and steals the Seniors' fortune, briefly leaving them destitute.
- Warmonga (voiced by Kerri Kenney-Silver) is a humanoid alien from the planet Lorwardia, a planet of warriors. After intercepting the broadcast of a months-old television commercial, Rappin' Drakken, she arrives on Earth believing that Drakken is the "Great Blue", a legendary leader who will lead Lorwardia's people to glory. Her name is an allusion to the word "warmonger", while Lorwardia is a spoonerism of warlord.
- Warhok (voiced by Ron Perlman) is a hot-tempered member of the Lorwardian Army alongside Warmonga. His name is a pun on the phrase "war hawk".
- Rudolph Farnsworth (voiced by John C. McGinley) is an actor who starred in the series Fearless Ferret as the villain White Stripe and believes it to be reality. When Ron dons the Fearless Ferret costume, Farnsworth comes out of hiding to battle him. He eventually realizes that the White Stripe is not real and reconciles with Timothy North, who played the Fearless Ferret.
- Yono the Destroyer (voiced by Clancy Brown) is an evil monkey-like entity who Monkey Fist frees in a bid at world domination. Yono petrifies Kim, Rufus, and Master Sensei before Hana defeats him, returning everyone he returned to normal.
- Zorpox the Conqueror (voiced by Will Friedle) is a villainous persona that Ron assumes after being affected by Dr. Drakken's Attitudinator. He is based on the villain of the same name from an in-universe comic book.
