= The Goldbergs season 5 =

The Goldbergs
- Season 5
- DVD cover
- Starring: Wendi McLendon-Covey; Sean Giambrone; Troy Gentile; Hayley Orrantia; George Segal; Jeff Garlin; Sam Lerner
- No. of episodes: 22

Release
- Original network: ABC
- Original release: September 27, 2017 – May 16, 2018

Season chronology
- ← Previous; Season 4 Next → Season 6

The fifth season of the American television comedy series The Goldbergs premiered on ABC on September 27, 2017, and concluded on May 16, 2018. The season is produced by Adam F. Goldberg Productions, Happy Madison Productions, Doug Robinson Productions, and Sony Pictures Television, and the executive producers are Adam F. Goldberg, Doug Robinson, and Seth Gordon.

The show explores the daily lives of the Goldberg family, a family living in Jenkintown, Pennsylvania in the 1980s. Beverly Goldberg (Wendi McLendon-Covey), the overprotective matriarch of the Goldbergs is married to Murray Goldberg (Jeff Garlin). They are the parents of three children, Erica (Hayley Orrantia), Barry (Troy Gentile), and Adam (Sean Giambrone). AJ Michalka was demoted to recurring for this season, while Sam Lerner was promoted to a regular cast member.

ABC renewed The Goldbergs for its fifth and sixth seasons in May 2017.

== Plot ==
Erica and Lainey have moved on to college, Barry is now a senior at William Penn and trying to get through life without Lainey, Adam is still with Jackie, and Beverly goes through a "Bevolution" as she comes to grips with her children all being gone from the house in a few years. Erica's new roommate and friend is also named Erica, and the two, along with Lainey, decide to drop out of college to pursue music careers instead. Lainey returns to town and reunites with Barry, and the season ends with the two declaring their engagement at his senior prom.

== Cast ==
=== Main cast ===
- Wendi McLendon-Covey as Beverly Goldberg
- Sean Giambrone as Adam Goldberg
- Troy Gentile as Barry Goldberg
- Hayley Orrantia as Erica Goldberg
- Sam Lerner as Geoff Schwartz
- George Segal as Albert "Pops" Solomon
- Jeff Garlin as Murray Goldberg

=== Recurring cast ===
- AJ Michalka as Lainey Lewis
- Tim Meadows as Mr. Glascott
- Stephen Tobolowsky as Principal Ball
- Bryan Callen as Mr. Mellor
- Jennifer Irwin as Virginia Kremp
- Stephanie Courtney as Essie Karp
- Mindy Sterling as Linda Schwartz
- Alison Rich as Erica "Valley Erica" Coolidge
- Kenny Ridwan as Dave Kim
- Stephanie Katherine Grant as Emmy Mirsky
- Rowan Blanchard as Jackie Geary
- Sean Marquette as Johnny Atkins
- Quincy Fouse as Taz Money
- Matt Bush as Andy Cogan
- Noah Munck as "Naked Rob" Smith
- Shayne Topp as Matt Bradley
- Niko Guardado as Ruben Amaro Jr.
- Karan Soni as Srinivas Bollimpalli (a.k.a. Srini the R.A.)
- Bill Goldberg as Coach Nick Mellor

== Episodes ==
No. overall	No. in season	Title	Directed by	Written by	Original release date	Prod. code	U.S. viewers (millions)
96	1	"Weird Science"	David Katzenberg	Chris Bishop	September 27, 2017	501	6.20
Erica is off to college at D.C. School of Arts, but she has one problem: having to say goodbye to her mom a thousand times before she leaves. In order to delay the parting, Beverly, along with Murray, helps move Erica into her dorm, and meets Erica's roommate, a valley girl also named Erica (Alison Rich). Bev decorates Erica's room and stays the night, leading to her daughter's humiliation around campus. After Beverly finally leaves, Valley Erica helps Erica realize she is lucky to have a mom that is always there for her. Meanwhile, Barry is back to school for his senior year and missing Lainey, so he needs a distraction: bullying Adam. After watching Weird Science, Adam gets the idea to make Barry the perfect girlfriend, but Barry doesn't think he can do it. With the help of science teacher Mr. Connelly (Ilan Mitchell-Smith) and girlfriend Jackie, Adam, Pops and Barry perform the Barbie doll experiment from the film. Even though he knew it was fake, Barry just wanted to prove to himself that Lainey wasn't a fluke. He starts looking after Adam's well-being at school, which some girls find attractive. Featured Songs: "Weird Science" by Oingo Boingo, "Tenderness" by General Public Guest Starring: Alex Jennings as Carla, Ron Funches as Froy, Ilan Mitchell-Smith as Mr. Connelly Notes: The date at the beginning of the episode is announced as "August 27th" instead of the expected "September 27th".; The episode is dedicated to "the time [Adam's] mom slept over in college".; First episode with Sam Lerner promoted to starring cast.; First appearance of Karan Soni as Erica's college resident advisor Srinivas Bollimpalli. He previously appeared in a guest starring role as Randy Mescunda in season 3.; First appearance of Allison Rich as Erica's college roommate Erica "Valley Erica" Coolidge. She would go on to become a series regular before transitioning to a staff writer and story editor.; First of eight season guest starring/co-starring appearances of Alex Jennings as classmate Carla Mann. Her first two are credited as "guest starring".
97	2	"Hogan Is My Grandfather"	Lew Schneider	Marc Firek	October 4, 2017	502	5.79
Adam's hard-ass history teacher, "Doc" (Kevin Heffernan), agrees to let him make a movie about World War II instead of writing a term paper. Because Pops is a veteran, Adam decides to interview him, but he finds all of his grandfather's war stories boring. Pops spices it up by telling fictional far-fetched tales that actually came from Hogan's Heroes episodes. Doc discovers Pops' stories are plagiarized from the show and gives Adam an 'F'. Adam throws a piece of chalk at him in disgust, earning him a trip to the principal's office. Realizing his mistake, Pops goes to Doc and explains the real reason behind the plagiarized film, and in turn Doc gives Adam a second chance to make the film, with successful results. Meanwhile, Valley Erica makes Erica realize that she can't take care of herself while away at college, resulting in Erica asking Beverly about her "mothering" techniques. This results in Beverly worrying about teaching Erica and Barry basic life skills in fear that they'll never need her anymore, so she tricks them into leaning on her. Later, with Murray's help, they go behind Bev's back and ask the single Coach Mellor for advice, and he trains them in life skills. Featured Songs: "Never Surrender" by Stan Bush, "Here I Go Again" by Whitesnake Guest Starring: Kevin Heffernan as Doc, Jonathan Schmock as Amdee Zukkunda Notes: The episode is dedicated to "Pops the star of [Adam's] first documentary".; First of two guest starring appearances by Jonathan Schmock. He also appears in one episode in season 6.; The "Amdee Zukkunda" character continues the tradition of writer Andy Secunda incorporating his name into an episode.
98	3	"Goldberg on The Goldbergs"	David Katzenberg	David Guarascio	October 11, 2017	503	5.66
After Barry breaks Adam's glasses during gym class, Beverly complains to Coach Mellor about pitting big brother against little brother. Rick Mellor reveals a troubled childhood in which his big brother Nick always picked on him. Beverly visits Nick (Bill Goldberg), now the defensive coordinator for the Villanova University football team, and tries to get him to reconcile the issues with Rick for the sake of her own two sons. Elsewhere, Erica worries about the huge phone bill she's racked up by calling Geoff Schwartz every night from her dorm room. She's shocked when Murray tells her not to worry about it, but Murray has an ulterior motive—keeping his daughter in her room every night and away from the trappings of college life. Featured Song: "Only You" by Yaz Notes: The episode is dedicated to Adam's "lifelong best bud Barry".
99	4	"Revenge o' the Nerds"	David Katzenberg	Jennifer Irwin	October 18, 2017	506	5.62
Erica is failing her film appreciation class, and her only hope for a passing grade is to write a term paper on a movie in one night. Erica has booked a musical performance that evening, so she calls Adam and invites him to D.C. for a visit. Adam brings Dave Kim, Chad Kremp and Sergei along, hoping for a Revenge of the Nerds college experience, but he soon learns that Erica was just using him to get the paper written. After Erica explains to Adam that college is nothing like the movie depictions, she and the guys work together to help her save her show and pass her class. Elsewhere, Beverly writes a resume and ponders the next chapter of her life—a "Bevolution"—which scares Murray because she won't be around to cook and clean as much. He suggests she just change her appearance rather than make a life change, so Bev gets a permanent hairdo. Although it looks horrible on her, Murray insists she looks great, but Bev soon catches on to his scheme. Meanwhile, Barry tries to get a home perm, but it does nothing to change the appearance of his already curly hair. Soon, all members of the JTP try perms, making each one look ridiculous. Featured Song: "Come Sail Away" (cover version) by Hayley Orrantia Absent: George Segal as Pops Notes: The episode is dedicated to Adam's "mom's giant 1980s home perm".; First of three season co-star appearances of Jackie Radinsky as Sergei Tarbokomous.; First of three season co-star appearances of Celesta DeAstis as Mitzi.
100	5	"Jackie Likes Star Trek"	Lea Thompson	Andrew Secunda	October 25, 2017	505	5.49
As they decide on Halloween costumes, Adam and Jackie have a major argument when Adam wants her to go as Princess Leia to his Han Solo. It turns out that Jackie does not like Star Wars, but is a big fan of Star Trek instead, and would like Adam to dress as Mr. Spock to her Lt. Uhura. With Adam worried about losing his girlfriend, Murray tries to teach him his technique of quietly acquiescing whenever Beverly wants to be in charge. Adam tries but Jackie sees right through it, and suggests that she and Adam should not be girlfriend and boyfriend. Adam later returns to apologize and profess his love for Jackie, no matter what her sci-fi preference is. Meanwhile, the JTP are playing with an Ouija board, which Barry uses to see if he and Lainey are destined to be together forever. Lainey is visiting Erica, and surprises Barry by showing up at the Goldberg's door on Halloween night. It turns out she has missed him greatly. The two vow that they will make the long-distance thing work, but later come to a realization that they are probably fooling themselves. Erica and Geoff have a similar discussion, insisting that they can make it work because they're only three hours apart and not twelve like Lainey and Barry. Featured Song: "Up Where We Belong" by Joe Cocker and Jennifer Warnes Notes: The date at the beginning of the episode is announced as "Halloween" instead of "October 25th".; The episode is dedicated to "our cast and crew for 100 amazing episodes".
101	6	"Girl Talk"	Jay Chandrasekhar	Steve Basilone	November 1, 2017	504	4.99
Trying to move on from Lainey, Barry sets his sights on Jamie Weisman (Lily Donoghue), but gets shot down. He and the JTP invade Erica's bedroom to try to find clues about how to understand girls, despite Erica explicitly telling them over the phone to stay out. Beverly offers to help, which is met with resistance from Barry, but after Bev helps Naked Rob meet a girl, Barry starts to see Bev as more than just a mom. Acting on mom's advice to just converse and be himself, Barry lands a study date with Jamie. Mr. Glascott warns Bev that Jamie is a "bleacher person" causing Bev to try and break up the couple, but she later learns that Jamie is a straight-A student and helps Barry look cool in front of Jamie. Elsewhere, Murray's Ottoman Empire is facing tough competition from the Formica King (Richard Kind), who is known for his outrageous local commercials. Murray asks Adam to make him a straightforward sales pitch commercial, but Marvin jumps in and adds ridiculous elements without telling Murray. Murray fires Marvin, but later sees that his commercial was surprisingly effective, as Ottoman Empire experiences an increase in customers. After a brief time where Marvin works for the Formica King, Murray hires him back. Featured Song: "Everybody Wants to Rule the World" by Tears for Fears Notes: The episode is dedicated to "the greatest 80s commercials".; First of two season co-star appearances of Ben Zelevansky as Dale.; First of two co-star appearances by Morgan McVey. She also appears in one episode in season 6.
102	7	"A Wall Street Thanksgiving"	Lew Schneider	Lauren Bans	November 15, 2017	507	5.63
The "Bevolution" continues, as Beverly decides that she will not go overboard on Thanksgiving this year and instead invites neighbors and friends for a pot luck meal. Bev also refuses to swoop in and help Erica when the latter reveals she got a high-interest credit card at college and has run up $3,000 in debt. Erica then goes to a shady credit card booth, gets a card in Beverly's name, and immediately withdraws a cash advance. Marvin arrives in a decked-out gold Cadillac, announcing he has made a bunch of money in the stock market. He ropes the JTP into giving him their money with promises to make them all rich. Barry is excited when Marvin later announces a stock he purchased with the investment has quadrupled, only to be let down when he learns that Murray ordered Marvin to give back Barry's $1,000 before the purchase. This results in Barry scolding Murray for his old school thinking, saying he never wants to be middle class like him. Marvin soon announces he lost the JTP's money (plus his own and Erica's cash advance) buying Atari stock, which has tanked due to disappointing sales of its E.T. video game. Coincidentally, Adam has been playing the game and hates it. Barry later sees Murray giving Marvin some money to get back on his feet, and realizes his dad's responsible ways aren't so bad. Geoff offers his life savings to Erica to get her out of debt, but she refuses, saying she needs to be responsible for her own mistakes. Featured Song: "Rocket Man (I Think It's Going to Be a Long, Long Time)" by Elton John Notes: The date at the beginning of the episode is announced as "Thanksgiving" instead of "November 15th".; The episode is dedicated to "the greatest video game console ever".; Director Lew Schneider makes a cameo appearance as the news anchor.
103	8	"The Circle of Driving Again"	Lew Schneider	Alex Barnow	November 29, 2017	508	5.63
Murray decides it's time for Adam to learn to drive, but there is one problem: Adam is too afraid and doesn't want to learn yet. Meanwhile, Erica is despondent over having no friends and no fun at college, which is only made worse when Barry visits and seems to fit right in on campus. Featured Song: "Pour Some Sugar On Me" by Def Leppard, covered by Hayley Orrantia Absent: Sam Lerner as Geoff Schwartz Notes: The episode is dedicated to "rock n' roll toga parties".; Continuing the tradition of writer Andy Secunda incorporating his name into an episode, Garrett Bales co-stars as "Van D. Schmikunda".
104	9	"Parents Just Don't Understand"	David Katzenberg	Dan Levy	December 6, 2017	509	5.43
Trying to make a music video in the vein of "Parents Just Don't Understand" by DJ Jazzy Jeff & The Fresh Prince, Adam and Barry create a video called "Dads Just Don't Care" in an attempt to make fun of Murray. However, Murray later finds out about the video and is upset that the boys think he is a bad father. After Murray scolds Adam and Barry, the boys make an unsuccessful attempt to reconcile with Murray by making another rap video, but they later win Murray's forgiveness with a heartfelt apology. Meanwhile, Erica is tired of Beverly calling all the time to check up on her, and starts refusing to answer her phone, making mom fear the worst. Erica then rebels against her mama's girl image by hosting a wild party with her roommate. Beverly arrives just as the party has gone out of control, helping the two Ericas recover and do damage control. Featured Songs: "Parents Just Don't Understand" by DJ Jazzy Jeff & The Fresh Prince, "Girls Just Want to Have Fun" by Cyndi Lauper Absent: George Segal as Pops Notes: The episode is dedicated to "all the moms who stay up at night worrying", followed by a sample of actual answering machine messages from Beverly Goldberg, who is credited with a co-starring appearance as "smother calling over and over".
105	10	"We Didn't Start the Fire"	Jay Chandrasekhar	Daisy Gardner	December 13, 2017	510	6.10
As Adam rehearses his holiday talent show song, Billy Joel's "We Didn't Start the Fire", in front of Jackie, Barry ponders why Adam has a girlfriend and he doesn't, and that Adam's popularity is growing while his isn't. Barry steals Adam's song, posting hundreds of flyers around the school promoting an appearance by "Barry Joel" at the show, but it soon becomes clear that Barry doesn't know the song's lyrics like Adam does. Barry goes to Adam's mentor, Pops, who tries to get Barry to do the Abbott & Costello "Who's on First?" comedy routine instead. When this proves futile, Adam approaches Barry with a way they can combine both of their strengths to do the Billy Joel song together. Elsewhere, Lou Schwartz and Beverly, each sensing a possible marriage between Erica and Geoff, start to compete over who will host Hanukkah celebrations for the combined families. Featured Song: "We Didn't Start the Fire" by Billy Joel Notes: The episode is dedicated to "the real Linda and Lou Schwartz".
106	11	"The Goldberg Girls"	Lea Thompson	Marc Firek	January 3, 2018	511	5.90
Beverly becomes concerned about who she will spend time with after her kids flee the nest. Inspired by The Golden Girls and Barry's JTP, she tries to form a friend group with Virginia Kremp, Linda Schwartz and Essie Karp. Her efforts fall flat as the other three are planning the school's ski trip and say they are all still too busy with their children. But when a snowstorm cancels the ski trip, Beverly swoops in with a plan to save the day. Meanwhile, Erica has grown tired of Geoff's daily romantic gestures, telling him she just wanted to spend her winter break relaxing. When a disappointed Geoff leaves, Erica becomes concerned that she is turning into her gruff, unromantic father. Taking a tip from Adam, Jackie, and some of their favorite 1980s romantic comedies, Erica drives Murray's lawnmower to Geoff's to profess her love, but it backfires when she runs into Lou's car. In the end, Erica tells Geoff she really does love him, even if she struggles to find ways to show it. The real-life Beverly Goldberg, Virginia Kremp, Essie Karp and Linda Schwartz make guest appearances as a group of older friends that the Beverly character longs to be like. Adam calls Erica, Lainey. Featured Song: "Thank You for Being a Friend" by Susanna Hoffs Notes: The episode is dedicated to "the real Goldberg Girls", followed by commentary from the real-life Beverly Goldberg, Virginia Kremp, Essie Karp and Linda Schwartz.; First of seven season co-star appearances of Nate Hartley as classmate Dan Morse.; Rubén Amaro Jr. makes a co-star appearance as Rubén Amaro Sr.
107	12	"Dinner with the Goldbergs"	Joanna Kerns	Andrew Secunda	January 10, 2018	512	6.05
Geoff surprises Erica by inviting her entire family out to join them for her birthday dinner at Beefsteak Charlie's. Erica is not pleased with this, because her family members are horrible restaurant patrons; Murray takes too long to decide what he wants, Beverly is way too specific about the details of her order and asks for ridiculous substitutions, Barry always orders some unusual dish that he ends up hating, Adam rebels against having to order off the kids' menu but cannot finish an adult-sized meal, and Pops always chats up patrons at nearby tables. Further, the family frequently complains about their entrees and returns them, but still wants the returned food packed up to take home. After the debacle, Geoff completely loses it and loudly berates the Goldbergs in front of the whole restaurant, which is what Erica feared would happen. Featured Song: "Everytime You Go Away" by Paul Young Notes: No date is announced at the beginning of the episode.; The episode is dedicated to "dinner with [Adam's] loud wonderful family".; Producer Annie Mebane makes a cameo appearance in the episode as "Kelly-Anne E. Mebbins".
108	13	"The Hooters"	Lew Schneider	Brian Hennelly	January 17, 2018	513	6.52
Erica rebels against her high school ways and tries to become a more cultured college student, even refusing to see Philadelphia-based band The Hooters with Geoff when he gets tickets. Geoff reluctantly decides to take Barry. Later, Geoff and Beverly show up at the avant-garde music event that Erica is attending with Valley Erica, partly to show support but mainly to convince Erica that she's being a pretentious ass. Erica shuns both of them. However, only a few minutes into the bagpipe-and-gong band's show, she realizes the error of her ways and runs to catch Geoff before he leaves. Meanwhile, Adam begins a wood shop class at school, only to learn that, like sports, it's another thing he's terrible at doing. After Adam decides he wants to take up comedy, he tries to be funny in the shop class, but after he accidentally causes his teacher (Clancy Brown) to have an accident that nearly injures him, Murray grounds him and tells Adam he isn't funny and needs to starting thinking about getting a real job. This causes Adam to completely lose his sense of humor, to the point that he's the only student who doesn't laugh when his shop teacher has a hilarious accident in class. When Murray finds out, an angry Adam lashes out at him, stating that he is the reason why he no longer has a sense of humor. Realizing the error of his actions, Murray confesses to Adam he was wrong to tell him not to pursue his dreams. Featured Song: "And We Danced" by The Hooters Guest Starring: The Hooters Notes: The episode is dedicated to "all the dads who let their kids dream".
–	–	"The Goldbergs: 1990-Something"	Jay Chandrasekhar	Teleplay by : Marc Firek; Story by : Adam F. Goldberg & Marc Firek	January 24, 2018	SPE	6.09
In what is described as the pilot for a spinoff set in the 1990s and featuring characters from William Penn Academy, Mr. Glascott replaces Mr. Ball as the school principal and hires his sister, a single mother with two teenage daughters, to serve as his new secretary, while the girls get to attend the school for free. Mr. Glascott and Coach Mellor disagree on the best way to teach the children. This episode served as a backdoor pilot for the spin-off series Schooled. Featured Song: "I Want It That Way" by Backstreet Boys
109	14	"Hail Barry"	Melissa Joan Hart	David Guarascio	February 28, 2018	514	5.44
Inspired by cable TV channels like QVC, Beverly wants to take the next step in her Bevolution and hawk her "Bev-Wear". With an unusually supportive Murray encouraging her, Bev creates a number of gaudy, bedazzled jean jackets, but is later depressed after QVC rejects them. Murray insists he can sell them at the furniture store and later brings Bev a wad of cash. But Bev soon learns the truth when a rep from the Goodwill store returns the jackets to the house. With Bev tied up starting Bev-Wear, Barry tries out for the William Penn football team, something his mom would never allow if she was her usual smothering self. Despite his attempts to impress Coach Mellor and Assistant Coach Fast (guest star Mike Quick), Barry is terrible and relegated to bench duty. Encouraged by Adam, Barry still finds a way to help the team, getting them fired up for a game with his rewrite of the Chicago Bears' "Super Bowl Shuffle". Featured Song: "We are the Champions" by Queen Notes: The episode is dedicated to "Bev-Wear (yes, it's all true)", followed by an interview between Wendi McLendon-Covey and Beverly Goldberg.; Prior to the end credits, Adam offers "Congratulations to the world champion Philadelphia Eagles" (who had just won Super Bowl LII earlier that month), followed by a "JTP Bowl" between the show's JTP and the real-life JTP, with Barry Goldberg, Geoff Schwartz, Rob Smith, Andy Cogan and Matt Bradley making cameo appearances. "Voice of the Eagles" Merrill Reese (who made a co-starring appearance as Mr. Meryll) announced the game, Mike Quick (who made a guest starring appearance as Ike Fast) is the game's two-way quarterback, and Philadelphia Eagles president Don Smolenski and general manager Howie Roseman present a trophy to the winners, the real-life JTP. The segment wraps up with "#FlyEaglesFly".; The real-life Drew Kremp also makes a cameo appearance in this episode.
110	15	"Adam Spielberg"	David Katzenberg	Teleplay by : Steve Basilone; Story by : Adam F. Goldberg	March 7, 2018	515	5.58
Adam decides to make his own Indiana Jones film with Jackie and Erica's help, and despite his insistence that she does not interfere, Beverly enlists Johnny, Carla, Dan, Taz Money and the JTP to assist with the production. The filming is plagued with issues, leading Adam to have a nervous breakdown and abandon his dream of directing. Beverly helps him see that the part of the process he most enjoyed was the scriptwriting, and he decides to pursue writing as a career, while the production resumes with Johnny as director. Meanwhile Barry claims to have found the best Philadelphia cheesesteak, recounting an anecdote in which he got lost and stumbled upon a diner in Jersey, which he has not been able to find again since. Learning the location of the diner from Mellor, Barry sets out with Murray, but during the trip they get lost for hours, pick a cheesesteak that proves far too spicy, and get locked out of the closed diner with their keys still inside. Trying to steal a less spicy cheesesteak from a man at a bus station, Barry is injured while fleeing. Murray consoles him at the hospital, and they return the next day to buy more cheesesteaks, which are just as magnificent as Barry alleged. Featured Song: "The Raiders March" by John Williams Notes: The episode is dedicated to Adam's "first and last time directing".
111	16	"The Scrunchie Rule"	David Katzenberg	Chris Bishop	March 21, 2018	517	5.73
Erica and her roommate 'Valley Erica' begin to irritate each other, which escalates to the point where Valley Erica claims their entire room in order to spend time with a boyfriend. Erica invites Barry to stay with her so he can annoy Valley Erica, only for them to form an unexpected romance. Erica and Barry invite further guests in their continued war of attrition: Lainey, Geoff and the rest of the JTP, and Johnny and Carla. Geoff tries to force the Ericas to work out their differences, only for Erica to offend her namesake by claiming they are strangers who were randomly paired together rather than actual friends. The Ericas eventually make amends and throw a party for their many guests and other college friends. Meanwhile Beverly struggles to cope with an empty house (as Adam is staying with Dave Kim), and takes it upon herself to look after Rick Mellor, who was accidentally injured by Adam, as well as his brother Nick, whose wife kicked him out. Murray gets Adam to return to satisfy Beverly and to bring her to her senses, whereupon she ejects the Mellors. Murray subsequently makes more of an effort to spend time with Beverly in their children's absence. Featured Song: "Your Love (The Outfield song)" by The Outfield Notes: The episode is dedicated to "the real Coach Mellor", followed by commentary from the real-life Rick Mellor.
112	17	"Colors"	Jay Chandrasekhar	Annie Mebane	March 28, 2018	516	5.49
After Beverly's friends make her realize Barry emotionally manipulates her so he and the JTP can have the run of the Goldberg house, a turf war breaks out between the JTP and the 'Frentas'. The Frentas are winning until they start fighting among themselves after the other mothers disrespect Barry, offending Beverly. Barry persuades Beverly to make amends with the Frendas, pointing out they only called him out because they care about her. Unable to attend rehearsals as Murray refuses to drive him, Adam is left out when the rest of the theatre students are allowed to take part in the local performance of Joseph and the Amazing Technicolor Dreamcoat. Forming an unexpected bond with Mellor over Cats, Adam hopes to get Murray to like theatre, and thus tricks his father into attending a musical by claiming to have bought hockey tickets, but when a deceived Murray expresses genuine affection, Adam is forced to get actual hockey tickets, though Mellor helps him out. Adam unexpectedly enjoys the game and subsequently persuades Murray to see Joseph with him, but Murray loses interest and falls asleep. To make amends, Murray persuades Cinoman to put on a production of Joseph at the school, so Adam can be involved. Featured Songs: "Colors" by Ice-T, "Any Dream Will Do" from Joseph and the Amazing Technicolor Dreamcoat, covered by Ana Gasteyer Notes: The episode is dedicated to Adam's "brother's gang The JTP", followed by commentary from the real-life Barry Goldberg, Geoff Schwartz, Rob Smith, Andy Cogan and Matt Bradley.
113	18	"MTV Spring Break"	Jay Chandrasekhar	Matt Mira	April 4, 2018	520	5.37
Barry, Erica, Johnny and Carla go to Florida for spring break. Barry and Erica stay at Al's condo but soon become disappointed and bored by the lack of spring break fun there, and they begin breaking rules and trying to have fun. Al reports them to the police for causing a disturbance, and they are furious, reminding him that the old Al would have been involved in the anarchy with them. They eventually reconcile and join the beach party. Beverly becomes obsessed with having a fur coat, so Murray buys her one, to her elation. Adam borrows it to film fake Bigfoot footage, but Geoff gets scared at the sight of the costumed Dave Kim and throws a smoothie at him, ruining the coat. Adam's efforts to fix the mess only make the coat worse, and he decides to own up to his failure so Beverly would see him as an adult. This backfires and provokes a huge rant from Beverly and Murray, leaving him furious that they do not appreciate his honesty. Adam uses this as leverage to rebel against his parents' authority, so they search for leverage against him, only to accidentally wreck his room. They claim the house was robbed, but he quickly figures out the truth. As they try to make amends with Adam, they discover that he has been gradually stealing money from Murray to buy a DeLorean. Despite being initially angry with Adam for his deceit, they ultimately use the stolen money to repair the damages done to his room, with Beverly openly admitting to Adam that, despite being the parents in the household, she and Murray don't always act like real adults. Featured Song: "No Sleep Till Brooklyn" by Beastie Boys Notes: The date at the beginning of the episode is announced as "spring break" instead of "April 4th".; The episode is dedicated to Adam's "brother the knish thief (yes, it's all true)", followed by an interview between Hayley Orrantia and Eric Goldberg.
114	19	"Flashy Little Flashdancer"	Jason Blount	Erik Weiner	April 11, 2018	521	5.22
The Frentas begin taking a dance class and Beverly invites her reluctant family to a performance by them, but when she then attempts to convince them to attend with a demonstration, they laugh hysterically at her, leaving her fearing that her Bevolution has been in vain. She later demoralises the other Frentas, all of them becoming convinced that they will never again be anything more than mothers, and Murray notices Beverly's emotional state and forces Erica and Barry to make it up to her. They quickly make amends, but Beverly is still upset that Murray ridiculed her too. He decides to apologize by dancing, but ends up injuring himself, though he makes it up to Beverly afterwards with a real apology, persuading her to get the Frentas to perform. Meanwhile Adam feels neglected when Emmy begins dating popular student Brian McMahon, feeling this will elevate her to a higher social status and leave him behind. He tries to set her up with less popular romantic prospects (Dave Kim, Dan and Sergei), and later gatecrashes a party to berate Emmy, inadvertently leading Brian to break up with her. A furious Emmy accuses Adam of being a hypocrite, pointing out that she always acted as a third wheel during his relationships with Dana and Jackie, after which Johnny Atkins ejects him from the party for being a bad friend. Adam earns Emmy's forgiveness by persuading Brian to get back together with her. Featured Song: "Flashdance... What a Feeling" by Irene Cara Guest Starring: Ricardo Hurtado as Brian McMahon Notes: The episode is dedicated to "life long friendships", followed by an interview between Sean Giambrone and the real-life Emmy Mirsky.; This is the final appearance of Jackie Radinsky as Sergei Tarbokomous.
115	20	"The Opportunity of a Lifetime"	Anton Cropper	Alex Barnow	May 2, 2018	518	4.79
Adam wins a radio contest in which a lucky listener gets to throw out the first pitch at a Philadelphia Phillies game. Adam then works out a deal to allow Barry to throw the pitch. Barry sees it as an opportunity to impress the Phillies and get a huge signing bonus to join the team, and he also convinces Murray that this is a chance of a lifetime. For a change, Beverly has to be the one to squelch a child's dream, as she doesn't want Barry to embarrass himself in front of 60,000 fans. When he practices with Murray, it becomes clear that Barry can't throw. He still goes through with the opening pitch, standing in front of the mound and lobbing a good toss to home plate. Elsewhere, Lainey is visiting Erica, and both complain about their first year in college. They discuss their passion for music and possibly playing together, also getting Valley Erica to join on drums. They quickly write a song, but somehow do not recognize its similarity to Joan Jett's "I Love Rock 'n' Roll". Valley Erica gets the band into CBGB in New York, having a relative with a connection to the establishment, but when they play their song they are quickly ushered off stage because it's a Joan Jett ripoff. Despite the disappointment, the Ericas and Lainey all decide they want to quit school and pursue music full-time. Featured Song: "I Love Rock 'n' Roll" by Joan Jett, covered by Hayley Orrantia, AJ Michalka and Alison Rich Notes: The episode is dedicated to "the opportunity of a lifetime", followed by real-life Barry Goldberg throwing out the first pitch to Mike Schmidt at Citizens Bank Park, which took place on "Goldbergs Night" on September 15, 2017. Instead of recreating Veterans Stadium for the show, Troy Gentile was also filmed throwing out a first pitch the same night.; Philadelphia sports media legend Angelo Cataldi makes a cameo appearance as the radio show host.; Eric B. makes a cameo appearance as the club manager, and his former producer Uncle Louie also makes a cameo appearance.
116	21	"Spaceballs"	Lew Schneider	Aaron Kaczander	May 9, 2018	519	4.74
Adam tries to start a Mel Brooks club after he sees the movie "Spaceballs" and Jackie mistakes his club advertisement for political satire and puts it in the school paper. Meanwhile, when Beverly and Pops come up for parents weekend at school, Erica plans to tell them she's quitting college, but Murray surprises them and tags along. Featured Song: "Goldbergs Theme Song" by Hayley Orrantia Notes: The episode is dedicated to "President Skroob".; During the end credits, a dream sequence features a cameo by Rick Moranis providing the voice of Dark Helmet.; This is the final appearance of Rowan Blanchard as Jackie Geary. Starting with season 6, she is played by Alexis G. Zall.; Only season co-star appearance of Sam Kindseth as David Sirota.
117	22	"Let's Val Kilmer This Car"	Lew Schneider	Matthew Edsall & Adam Olsen & Hans Rodionoff	May 16, 2018	522	5.09
Barry is hell-bent on pulling off a legendary prank, with the ulterior motive of getting suspended so he doesn't have to go to senior prom alone. At home, Murray insists that if Erica won't stay in college, she must get a real job and pay rent, but Erica is sure she can make money with her music. Beverly secretly slips Principal Ball a wad of money to hire Erica's band for the prom. With Adam's help, Barry disassembles Principal Ball's Suzuki Samurai (which ends up looking more like vandilism than a harmless prank) causing Ball to declare prom cancelled until someone confesses. Erica, Valley Erica and Lainey are dejected as a result. Erica learns that Beverly set up her gig and wants her to just pay her directly causing her to lash out for her daughter to get a real job. Barry ultimately confesses to Ball, but he wants Barry to stay silent because he was able to get a new Pontiac Fiero with the insurance money from his damaged Suzuki. Ball, however, does secretly ban Barry from attending prom as punishment. The girls contemplate on how they can't stay with any of their families. Lainey learns from Adam that Barry confessed, and that he did it so that she and the band would still get to play at prom. Erica makes up with her parents and announces that while they will still play prom, she declares she will find a real job to pay rent. As prom night proceeds, Barry is sitting alone on the football field, dejected that he can't get credit for his prank. Lainey stops to talk with him. Proclaiming that he can't imagine life without her, Barry impulsively asks Lainey to marry him, and she accepts. The two run into the prom, and Lainey heads to the stage as Barry shouts, "We're getting married!", much to the shock of Bev and Murray. Featured Song: "More Than a Feeling" by Boston, covered by Hayley Orrantia Notes: The episode is dedicated to Adam's "real family", followed by a montage of Adam's home video clips played side-by-side with the show's re-enactments of them.

== Ratings ==
Viewership and ratings per episode of The Goldbergs: 1990-Something
No.	Title	Air date	Rating/share (18–49)	Viewers (millions)	DVR (18–49)	DVR viewers (millions)	Total (18–49)	Total viewers (millions)
1	"Weird Science"	September 27, 2017	1.8/7	6.20	0.8	TBD	2.6	—N/a
2	"Hogan Is My Grandfather"	October 4, 2017	1.6/6	5.79	0.7	—N/a	2.3	—N/a
3	"Goldberg on the Goldbergs"	October 11, 2017	1.5/6	5.66	—N/a	—N/a	—N/a	—N/a
4	"Revenge O' the Nerds"	October 18, 2017	1.5/6	5.62	—N/a	—N/a	—N/a	—N/a
5	"Jackie Likes Star Trek"	October 25, 2017	1.4/5	5.49	—N/a	—N/a	—N/a	—N/a
6	"Girl Talk"	November 1, 2017	1.3/5	4.99	—N/a	—N/a	—N/a	—N/a
7	"A Wall Street Thanksgiving"	November 15, 2017	1.5/6	5.63	—N/a	—N/a	—N/a	—N/a
8	"The Circle of Driving Again"	November 29, 2017	1.4/5	5.63	—N/a	—N/a	—N/a	—N/a
9	"Parents Just Don't Understand"	December 6, 2017	1.5/6	5.43	—N/a	—N/a	—N/a	—N/a
10	"We Didn't Start the Fire"	December 13, 2017	1.6/6	6.08	—N/a	—N/a	—N/a	—N/a
11	"The Goldberg Girls"	January 3, 2018	1.5/6	5.90	—N/a	—N/a	—N/a	—N/a
12	"Dinner with the Goldbergs"	January 10, 2018	1.5/6	6.05	—N/a	—N/a	—N/a	—N/a
13	"The Hooters"	January 17, 2018	1.7/7	6.52	—N/a	—N/a	—N/a	—N/a
14	"Hail Barry"	February 28, 2018	1.3/5	5.44	—N/a	—N/a	—N/a	—N/a
15	"Adam Spielberg"	March 7, 2018	1.5/6	5.58	—N/a	—N/a	—N/a	—N/a
16	"The Scrunchie Rule"	March 21, 2018	1.6/6	5.73	0.6	—N/a	2.2	—N/a
17	"Colors"	March 28, 2018	1.4/6	5.49	—N/a	—N/a	—N/a	—N/a
18	"MTV Spring Break"	April 4, 2018	1.4/6	5.37	—N/a	—N/a	—N/a	—N/a
19	"Flashy Little Flashdancer"	April 11, 2018	1.3/5	5.22	0.6	—N/a	1.9	—N/a
20	"The Opportunity of a Lifetime"	May 2, 2018	1.2/5	4.79	TBD	TBD	TBD	TBD
21	"Spaceballs"	May 9, 2018	1.2/6	4.74	TBD	TBD	TBD	TBD
22	"Let's Val Kilmer This Car"	May 16, 2018	1.2/6	5.09	TBD	TBD	TBD	TBD
