= The Goldbergs (2013 TV series) =

American period television sitcom (2013–2023)

- Genre: Sitcom
- Created by: Adam F. Goldberg
- Based on: Goldberg family
- Showrunners: Adam F. Goldberg; Alex Barnow; Chris Bishop
- Starring: Wendi McLendon-Covey; Sean Giambrone; Troy Gentile; Hayley Orrantia; George Segal; Jeff Garlin; AJ Michalka; Sam Lerner
- Narrated by: Patton Oswalt
- Theme music composer: I Fight Dragons
- Opening theme: "Rewind" by I Fight Dragons
- Composer: Michael Wandmacher
- Country of origin: United States
- Original language: English
- No. of seasons: 10
- No. of episodes: 229 (list of episodes)

Production
- Executive producers: Adam F. Goldberg; Doug Robinson; Seth Gordon; Alex Barnow; Marc Firek; David Guarascio; Mike Sikowitz; David Katzenberg; Annette Sahakian Davis; Chris Bishop; Lew Schneider; Andrew Secunda; Annie Mebane; Wendi McLendon-Covey; Bill Callahan
- Producer: Dan Levy
- Production locations: Sony Pictures Studios, Culver City, California
- Cinematography: Joseph E. Gallagher; Jason Blount
- Editors: Jonathan Corn; Joe Victo; Alex Smit; Eli Coleman
- Camera setup: Single-camera
- Running time: 22 minutes
- Production companies: Adam F. Goldberg Productions (seasons 1–8); Happy Madison Productions; Exhibit A (season 2, episode 1); Doug Robinson Productions (seasons 5–10); Swinging Cricket Productions (season 9, episodes 1 and 3); Old European Elegance (season 9, episode 2); Script L. Shannon, Inc. (season 9, episode 4–season 10); This Episode is Entirely a Work of Fiction, LLC (season 10); Sony Pictures Television Studios (Note: Credited as Sony Pictures Television in seasons 1–6.)

Original release
- Network: ABC
- Release: September 24, 2013 – May 3, 2023

Related
- Schooled

The Goldbergs is an American television sitcom that aired on the ABC network from September 24, 2013, to May 3, 2023. The series was created by Adam F. Goldberg and starred Jeff Garlin, Wendi McLendon-Covey, Sean Giambrone, Troy Gentile, and Hayley Orrantia. The show is produced by Adam F. Goldberg, Seth Gordon and Doug Robinson. It is based on Goldberg's childhood and family in the 1980s, with a childhood version of himself. On April 19, 2022, the series was renewed for a tenth season, which premiered on September 21, 2022. On February 23, 2023, it was announced that the tenth season would be its final season. The series finale aired on May 3, 2023. The series received mostly positive reviews from critics.

== Premise ==
Promotional poster used for the series' first season

The Goldbergs is set in a non-chronological representation of the 1980s in the Philadelphia suburb of Jenkintown, Pennsylvania, and shows the reality of the 1980s through a preadolescent's and, later in the series, teenager's eyes. The show is loosely based on the showrunner's childhood, during which he regularly videotaped events. Many of these videos are reenacted for series episodes, with the original version then shown before the end credits.

The series stars Jeff Garlin as the father, Murray, and Wendi McLendon-Covey as the mother, Beverly. Their two older children are Erica (Hayley Orrantia) and Barry (Troy Gentile). The youngest child, Adam (Sean Giambrone), documents his family life with his video camera. Beverly's father, Albert "Pops" Solomon (George Segal), is frequently around to provide advice or to help out his grandchildren (often behind his daughter's back).

The present-day Adult Adam (Patton Oswalt) narrates every episode as taking place in "1980-something". The show's episodes are frequently built around the era's pop culture in a non-chronological order, and each season contains references from throughout the decade.

Many references to real-life Philadelphia-area businesses are made, including the Wawa convenience store chain, Gimbels department store, Willow Grove Park Mall, and Kremp's Florist of Willow Grove, Pennsylvania. Additionally, several 1980s cultural icons guest star as themselves on the show and a number of figures from Goldberg's actual life guest star as fictional characters or their own parents.

The series is an example of 1980s nostalgia.

== Cast and characters ==
Character	Portrayed by	Seasons									
Character	Portrayed by	1	2	3	4	5	6	7	8	9	10
Beverly Goldberg	Wendi McLendon-Covey	Main	Main	Main	Main	Main	Main	Main	Main	Main	Main
Adam Goldberg	Sean Giambrone	Main	Main	Main	Main	Main	Main	Main	Main	Main	Main
Barry Goldberg	Troy Gentile	Main	Main	Main	Main	Main	Main	Main	Main	Main	Main
Erica Goldberg	Hayley Orrantia	Main	Main	Main	Main	Main	Main	Main	Main	Main	Main
Albert Solomon	George Segal	Main (Note: Although George Segal appears as a series regular from season 1 episode 1 through season 8 episode 16, he is still credited through the season finale.)	Main	Main	Main	Main	Main	Main	Main		
Murray Goldberg	Jeff Garlin	Main	Main	Main	Main	Main	Main	Main	Main	Main	
Lainey Lewis	AJ Michalka	Recurring	Recurring	Main	Main	Recurring	Recurring	Guest	Guest	Guest	Guest
Geoff Schwartz	Sam Lerner		Recurring	Recurring	Recurring	Main	Main	Main	Main	Main	Main

=== Main cast ===
- Wendi McLendon-Covey as Beverly Goldberg (née Solomon), the overprotective matriarch of the Goldbergs. She is often called their "smother" by the children. As such, Beverly frequently injects herself into their lives, often to their embarrassment. At the same time, however, she is extremely supportive and encouraging of the children's endeavors, being supremely confident in their abilities.
- Sean Giambrone as Adam Goldberg, the jovial, good-natured youngest child of the Goldbergs. An aspiring filmmaker, he frequently films his family's activities on a VHS camcorder. Adam often ends up having to use his middle initial to distinguish himself from another Adam Goldberg who attends the same school. Unlike Barry and Erica, he is depicted as being a stereotypical nerd, having an array of geeky hobbies and passions, such as an obsession with Star Wars.
  - Patton Oswalt as adult Adam Goldberg, who narrates the show from the present day.
- Troy Gentile as Barry Norman Goldberg, the short-tempered, somewhat naïve middle child of the Goldbergs. Though untalented in many ways, he remains highly self-assured while attempting to make himself popular in school. Barry has a competitive streak, insisting on "dominating" everything he does, especially sports. He is an avid fan and player of basketball and ice hockey (often wearing his favorite Philadelphia Flyers jersey), and made the school wrestling team. He also listens to rap music (giving himself the rap name "Big Tasty"), and is the leader of a crew called the Jenkintown Posse (abbreviated "JTP", which fellow members repeat whenever the initials are spoken). In the fifth-season finale, Barry proposes to Lainey and she accepts, but they do not go through with a wedding. He graduates from high school in the sixth-season finale and heads to college in season 7 along with his sister Erica, where he begins studying to become a doctor. He develops an affection for Geoff Schwartz's sister Joanne, and begins dating her in season 9. Barry is based on Adam's real-life brother of the same name.
- Hayley Orrantia as Erica Dorothy Schwartz (née Goldberg), the intelligent and musically gifted but rebellious, somewhat sour oldest child of the Goldbergs. The early seasons of the series have Erica as the love interest of Geoff Schwartz, and although she rejects his initial attempts to make her fall in love with him, they become a couple midway through season 4 and get married in season 9. In the fifth season, Erica leaves for college at D.C. School of the Arts, only to drop out at the end of the season to start a band with Lainey and Valley Erica. After her music aspirations end up going nowhere, she decides to head back to college to get her life back on track. At the end of Season 9, Erica reveals that she is pregnant. Her child, a daughter named Muriel Allison Goldberg Schwartz, is born early in season 10. "Erica" is based on Adam's real-life brother, Eric Goldberg.
- George Segal as Albert "Pops" Solomon (seasons 1–8), Beverly's laid-back widowed father and a World War II Veteran. Though an elderly man with a number of comic eccentricities, he acts much younger than his age and often gives sage advice to his grandchildren. Adam considers him his best friend and they often go on side adventures together. He once owned a successful furniture store called Ottoman Empire that allowed him to retire comfortably, and he now lets his son-in-law Murray run the business. The final episode featuring his character was "Couple Off," the 16th episode of the show's 22-episode 8th season. Following Segal's death in March 2021, the season 9 premiere, "The Goldbergs' Excellent Adventure," was dedicated to his memory.
- Jeff Garlin as Murray Moshe Goldberg (seasons 1–9), the sour, somewhat asocial patriarch of the Goldbergs. Unlike Beverly, he is realistic about his children's abilities and believes she smothers them too much. Despite his apathetic tendencies at home, Murray values hard work and has held various full-time positions since his teenage years. He does not always show affection for his children, frequently calling them "morons" when they make mistakes or behave in immature ways, yet he truly cares about them and wants them to learn how to fend for themselves. Murray runs Pops's furniture business, loves sports, and is often seen lounging in front of the family TV in his underpants. Despite Garlin's departure from the cast in December 2021, during which Season 9 had yet to wrap production, Murray remained on the show via the use of outtakes, CGI and stand-ins, before it was announced that the character would die the next season. He later died off-screen in the season 10 premiere "If You Build It."
- AJ Michalka as Lainey Lewis (seasons 3–4; recurring seasons 1–2 & 5–6, guest seasons 7–10), Erica's best friend whom Barry has had a lifelong crush on. Lainey is being raised by a single father, Bill, given that her alcoholic mother left them a few years prior to the series. To the surprise of many, Lainey kisses Barry at a party in the first-season finale, the two slowly grow closer together in season two and eventually become an unlikely couple. Following the fourth season, she has gone to attend fashion school in Savannah, Georgia and ended her relationship with Barry. In season 5, she returns to Jenkintown after dropping out along with Erica to start a band. In the final seconds of the season finale, she and Barry agree to wed. In the sixth season, Lainey not only ends the engagement but leaves for L.A. to pursue her dreams alone, but not before promising Barry that when they were ready, they'd be together. Lainey appeared as a main character in the spin-off series, Schooled, which revealed she returned to Jenkintown in the 1990s and became the music teacher at William Penn Academy.
- Sam Lerner as Geoff "Madman" Schwartz (seasons 5–10; recurring seasons 2–4), one of Barry's best friends, and a member of the "JTP". His nickname "Madman" is a form of ironic humor, given how good-natured and well-behaved he is, especially compared to Barry. Geoff is known for being infatuated with Erica and makes many futile attempts to win her affections. At the end of the third season, he begins dating Evelyn Silver just as Erica realizes she reciprocates Geoff's feelings. He later breaks up with Evey to be with Erica. Geoff takes a gap year as Erica prepares to return to college at the start of season 7. However, after months of following the Grateful Dead and starting a failed business venture, he decides to enroll in college full-time and moves into Erica's dorm room. Erica insists they break up in season 8 when she realizes how Geoff's extreme devotion to her has him putting his own dreams on hold. She urges him to find out who he is without her, but the break-up only lasts for a short time. They get back together near the end of the season, and ultimately get married in season 9.

=== Recurring cast ===
==== Extended family ====
- Judd Hirsch as Ben "Pop Pop" Goldberg (seasons 3, 7–10, guest season 4), Murray's cantankerous, opinionated father, whom Murray views as a rival.
  - Pop Pop first appeared in one season 2 episode, and was portrayed by Paul Sorvino where he is portrayed similar to Murray (though far worse) and patriotic such as believing E.T. should have been dissected for military purposes and Elliot should be arrested after Adam tried and failed to make him cry from watching the movie.
- Dan Fogler as Marvin Goldberg (seasons 1–7, 10), Murray's carefree, unreliable younger brother who is frequently involved in bizarre get-rich-quick schemes that always end up failing
- Lucky, the Goldbergs' pet dog introduced in season 3. While the family originally got the dog based on Barry's insistence for one, Lucky develops a bond with Murray.

==== Friends and classmates ====
- Natalie Alyn Lind as Dana Caldwell (season 1–3, 7; guest season 4 & season 10), Adam's classmate who becomes his girlfriend. In the season 2 finale, it is revealed Dana may be moving to Seattle. The season 3 premiere confirms she is now living in Seattle. Adam and Dana continue a long-distance relationship, but it ends when the two realize how different they have become. Dana returns to Jenkintown in season 7 after her grandmother in Seattle passes away, but makes it clear to Adam that she just wants to be friends. The real-life counterpart for "Dana" is named Amanda Caldwell. The first name was changed due to early legal concerns about the show's autobiographical nature.
- Kenny Ridwan as Dave Kim (seasons 1–9; guest season 10), an awkward classmate and friend of Adam's, who is always addressed by his full name, even by his own mother. He is known for his "bowl" haircut and thick glasses, as well as constantly wearing turtlenecks. He shockingly dates troublemaker Carla Mann for a brief time in season 6.
- Stephanie Katherine Grant as Emmy "Muscles" Mirsky (seasons 1–9), a girl in the neighborhood with whom Adam likes to spend time. Because they grew up together, she and Adam treat each other as best friends rather than as potential love interests, and she behaves like "one of the guys" in the company of Adam and friends. In her sophomore year of high school, she wants Adam's help with meeting a boy she's interested in dating, and Adam initially has trouble seeing her that way.
- Rowan Blanchard (seasons 4–5), Alexis G. Zall (season 6; guest season 10) as Jackie Geary, Adam's girlfriend who shares his love of science fiction. Jackie graduates from high school in Season 6, and does not make an appearance (although she does get mentioned once) throughout the rest of the series.
- Sam Kindseth as David Sirota (season 2, guest 5–6), Adam's goofy friend and classmate. In the present, he is an American political commentator and radio host.
- Nate Hartley as Dan (seasons 2–7), a nerdy punching bag, who is a member of the school band and drama club
- Jacob Hopkins as Chad Kremp (seasons 1–3, 6–7; guest seasons 4–5, 8), Virginia's youngest son and Adam's closest friend. In real life, Chad becomes the owner of his family's flower shop, Kremp's Florist.
- Tyler Stokes as Drew Kremp (season 1; guest seasons 3, 8), Chad's older brother and Erica's ex-boyfriend
- Jackson Odell as Ari Caldwell (seasons 1–2), a popular student, a friend of Lexie Bloom and Erica, and Dana's older brother
- Cooper Roth (season 1) and Zayne Emory (season 2–9) as J. C. Spink, a bully who torments Adam but becomes his friend in later seasons. The original film producer who inspired the character portrays a school bus driver.
- Virginia Gardner as Lexie Bloom (season 1; mentioned season 4), a popular classmate of Barry's who he has a crush on for the first season
- Joey Luthman as Roger McFadden (season 1), a nerdy classmate of Barry's
- Mason Cook as Tyler Stansfield (season 1; guest seasons 2–3), a puny but fierce classmate of Adam.
- Allie Grant as Evelyn "Evey" Silver (seasons 2–4; guest season 5), a girl Beverly tries to set up Barry with; she ends up briefly dating Geoff Schwartz
- Niko Guardado as Rubén Amaro, Jr. (seasons 3–6), a popular student and champion athlete always addressed by his full name. In adulthood, he becomes a major league baseball player and the General Manager of the Philadelphia Phillies.
- Charlie DePew as Anthony Balsamo (season 2; guest season 3), a popular, good-looking student and Lainey's ex-boyfriend.
- Sean Marquette as Johnny Atkins (season 3–10), a ponytailed, saxophone-playing troublemaker. Much like Barry Goldberg, he has a delusionally high opinion of himself. He is always seen wearing a Rush tour t-shirt. In addition to the saxophone, he also plays the drums. Erica dated him briefly. In season 7, Adam mentions that Johnny is starting his "third senior year". He is out of high school in season 8 and working at a roller rink. In the spin-off series Schooled, Johnny is shown to be working at William Penn as a custodian.
- Noah Munck as 'Naked' Rob Smith (season 2–10), one of Barry's best friends and member of the "JTP" who goes shirtless at any opportunity
- Matt Bush as Andy Cogan (season 2–10), one of Barry's best friends and a member of the "JTP" who is frequently teased for his short stature
- Alex Jennings as Carla Mann (season 3–10), a popular student and friend of Erica and Lainey who is a bit of a troublemaker. She was an on-off girlfriend of Johnny Atkins and started dating Dave Kim late in season 6. She is out of high school in season 8 and working at a roller rink. She is shown working as a pharmaceutical sales representative in the spinoff series.
- Quincy Fouse as Taz Money (seasons 3–5), a popular friend of Adam
- Nathan Gamble as Garry Ball (seasons 2–3), the Principal's rebellious son and Adam's only cool friend
- Shayne Topp as Matt Bradley (season 4–10), a punk rocker-turned-Deadhead who becomes the newest member of the "JTP", over Barry's initial objections. Adult Adam's voice-over later confides that Matt would become Barry's closest friend after high school.
- Alison Rich as Erica "Valley Erica" Coolidge (season 5–6; guest seasons 7 & 9), Erica's Valley girl roommate at college. She dropped out of college with Erica and Lainey to play drums in their band and lived with the Goldbergs in season 6.
- Kelli Berglund (seasons 7, 9), Carrie Wampler (season 8) as Lauren ("Ren"), Erica's college friend who later dates Barry (Wampler took over as Ren in season 8 due to project commitments that prevented Berglund from continuing in the role). Early in season 8, Ren breaks up with Barry after realizing she still has feelings for her previous boyfriend.
- Matt Cornett as Andrew Gallery (season 7), the most popular guy in school.
- Sadie Stanley as Brea Bee (season 7–9; guest season 10), one of the most popular girls in school who later becomes Adam's girlfriend after the two are partnered for a lab assignment and discover they have a lot of mutual interests. It is revealed in season 8 that Brea lives with her divorced mother and her family struggles financially.
- Beth Triffon as Joanne Schwartz (season 8–10), Geoff's older sister who begins dating Barry.
- Theodore Barnes as Brian Walls (season 7-10), a popular student.

==== William Penn faculty ====
- Stephen Tobolowsky as Principal Earl Ball (season 2–10), the principal of the Goldberg children's high school. Beverly frequently confronts him when she believes one of her children has been wronged during classes or school activities. In the spin-off series, Ball eventually receives a promotion to superintendent of the school district and is succeeded as principal of William Penn Academy by Mr. Glascott.
- Tim Meadows as Jonathan "Andre" Glascott (season 1–10), a disenchanted teacher who also delivers pizza and gives guitar lessons for extra money. He serves as the school's hapless guidance counselor. Glascott appears as a main protagonist of the spin-off series, which reveals he succeeded Earl Ball as principal. In that series, he reveals that he went by the name "Andre" early in his career because his master's diploma mistakenly has the first name of his college program's only other black graduate student, Andre Jones.
- Bryan Callen as Rick Mellor (seasons 1–6; guest season 7), the high school's no-nonsense gym teacher and coach. He has a habit of giving nicknames to the Goldberg kids as he constantly addresses Erica as "Girl Goldberg" and Adam as "Goldfarb". In the sixth season, Mellor left William Penn to train wrestlers, but not before making peace with Adam and leaving his position to his brother Nick. This was done so Bryan Callen could reprise his role in the spin-off series, which reveals he returned to his old job.
- Michaela Watkins as Ms. Taraborelli (season 2), a socially awkward Spanish and sex education teacher
- Dan Bakkedahl as Dale Woodburn (seasons 2, 7–9), Adam's depressed science and history teacher (there is a long gap between the character's appearances, due to Bakkedahl's commitments to the series Life in Pieces). In his later appearances, Mr. Woodburn has taken a role as a sidekick to Principal Ball.
- Ana Gasteyer as Susan Cinoman (season 2–9), a music and drama teacher at the Goldberg children's high school and brief love interest of Rick Mellor. She is shown to still be teaching at William Penn in the spinoff series.
- Bill Goldberg as Nick Mellor (season 5–9), Coach Mellor's brutish brother. Although he initially appears as the defensive coordinator of the Villanova University football team, he later takes over his brother's role as the William Penn gym teacher when Rick leaves to train wrestlers.
- Clancy Brown as Mr. Crosby (seasons 5–6), Adam's unenthusiastic shop teacher
- Steve Guttenberg as Dr. Katman (seasons 6–7; guest season 8, 10), a science teacher
- Anthony Michael Hall as Mr. Perott (season 7–10), Adam's new motorcycle-riding guidance counselor who's seen as one of the coolest teachers in school
  - Hall also appeared in the season 7 premiere as a Disneyland security guard who greets the Goldbergs when they arrive before the park opens (while a nod to Hall's character name in the film National Lampoon's Vacation, it is not a reprisal of Rusty, but rather the security guard that was played by John Candy)

==== Other ====
- Louis Gregory as Uncle Louie (guest seasons 5–6), Valley Erica's Uncle
- Cedric Yarbrough as Vic (seasons 1–2, 7–9; guest seasons 3, 10), Murray's friend and co-worker from Canada
- Troy Winbush as Puchinski (season 1; guest seasons 2–3, 5–10), a police officer who sometimes runs afoul of the Goldbergs' craziness, and often sympathises with Beverly
- Ben Zelevansky as Dale (season 1; guest seasons 5–6), the manager of the arcade frequented by Adam, Barry, and Pops
- Kathryn Leigh Scott as Miriam Ferguson (season 1), one of Pops' lovers
- Jennifer Irwin as Virginia "Ginzy" Kremp (seasons 1–10), Chad's mother, neighbor to the Goldbergs
- Barbara Alyn Woods as Mrs. Caldwell (season 1), Dana, Ari and Dougie's mother. Woods is the real-life mother of Natalie Alyn Lind, who portrays Dana.
- Dustin Ybarra as Nitrous (season 1; guest season 3), a university student who occasionally interacts with Beverly. Usually, Beverly has to make a demand of Nitrous, which he will agree to, but only after trying to coerce her into showing him her breasts or giving him $1 million.
- Suzy Nakamura as Mrs. Kim (season 2; guest season 6), Dave Kim's mother and the owner of a Chinese restaurant frequented by the Goldbergs
- Rob Huebel as John Calabasas (seasons 6–7; guest seasons 2–5, 8, 10), an opportunistic businessman with several careers who usually offers "too good to be true" opportunities to one of the Goldbergs
- David Koechner as Bill Lewis (seasons 2–10), Lainey's father who is raising her as a single parent. To Murray's dismay, Bill is a major fan of the Dallas Cowboys, starting a rivalry between the two. Bill and Murray eventually become good friends as they discover that outside of football, they have a lot in common.
- Jessica St. Clair as Dolores (seasons 7–8), the wife of Bill Lewis and Lainey's step-mother
- Christopher Avila as Raji Mitra (season 3), an intelligent student Beverly hires to tutor Lainey
- J. C. Spink as Joe the Bus Driver (guest seasons 1–2)
- Ken Lerner as Lou Schwartz (seasons 5–10), Geoff's father. Lerner is the real-life father of Sam Lerner, who portrays Geoff.
- Mindy Sterling as Linda Schwartz (seasons 5–10), Geoff's mother
- Stephanie Courtney as Essie Karp (seasons 5–10), a friend of Beverly's who is also good friends with Linda Schwartz and Ginzy Kremp
- Brec Bassinger as Zoe McIntosh (guest seasons 1, 4), a diner waitress whom Adam has a brief crush on
- Richard Kind as Michael "Formica Mike" Mikowitz (seasons 8–9; guest seasons 5–7, 10), Murray's rival in the furniture business. Towards the end of Season 7, Mike offers to buy the Ottoman Empire from Murray, but the two instead agree to a merger and become business partners.
- Erinn Hayes as Jane Bales (seasons 8–10), Beverly's more successful, callous rival
  - Jane first appeared in two episodes of season 7 and was portrayed by Leslie Grossman
- Zach Callison as Brian Corbett (seasons 3–8), a stereotypical jock and J.C. Spink's close friend.

=== Guest cast ===
- Tom Cavanagh as Charles Kremp, Chad's father (season 1, episode 8)
- Martin Starr as Andre, the local video store clerk who bans Murray after an excessively late rental (season 1)
- Tanner Buchanan as Evan Turner (special participation; 2 episodes)
- Thomas Lennon as Taun-Taun Todd, a Star Wars fan that Erica and Adam meet while waiting in line to see Return of the Jedi (season 1, episode 22)
- David Spade as Gus, a sketchy manufacturer of fake IDs (season 2, episode 1)
- Charlie Sheen as the man in the police station, reprising his role from Ferris Bueller's Day Off (season 2, episode 14)
- Nick Swardson as Rick, a sketchy black market toy dealer (season 2, episode 15)
- Chuck Norris as himself (voice only), who is heard from offscreen reading a letter to Barry (season 3)
- "Weird Al" Yankovic as himself (season 3, episode 15)
- Chad Coleman as Leon, a manager of Spencer's Gifts store (season 4)
- Martin Kove as Master John, a kind sensei who is the opposite of his role as Cobra Kai dojo sensei John Kreese (season 4)
- Ilan Mitchell-Smith as Mr. Connelly, the science teacher in the fifth-season premiere episode "Weird Science". Mitchell-Smith portrayed Wyatt Donnelly in the film Weird Science.
- Mike Quick as Coach Fast, an assistant football coach at William Penn (season 5)
- Rick Moranis as Dark Helmet (voice only), reprising his role from Spaceballs (season 5)
- Rick Springfield as Gary, the owner of Gary-oke's Karaoke Bar where Erica works (season 6, episode 3)
- Robert Englund as Freddy Krueger, reprising his iconic role from A Nightmare on Elm Street (season 6)
- Jon Lovitz as Jimmie Moore, reprising his role from The Wedding Singer (season 6)
- Christie Brinkley reprising her role as the flirty woman in the car from National Lampoon's Vacation (season 7, episode 1)
- Kirstie Alley as Janice Bartlett
- Rhea Perlman as Margot Letien
- John Ratzenberger as Digby Yates
- George Wendt as Ned Frank
- Tim Matheson and James Widdoes as Eric Stratton and Robert Hoover (season 7), reprising their Animal House characters who are now Delta House recruiters on the campus where Barry and Erica attend college
- Haley Pullos as Jazzy Skye, a teenage neighbor who lives across The Goldbergs (season 3 episode 6)
- Hulk Hogan as himself (season 7, episode 7)
- Tommy Lee as Professor Lee (season 7, episode 14)
- Miranda Cosgrove as Elana Reed (season 7, episode 14)
- Michael Hitchcock as Lon MacDowell (season 7, episode 19)
- Lea Thompson as Fran Mikowitz, Formica Mike's wife (season 7, episode 20 and season 9, episode 10)
- John Oates as John, a janitor who cleans up the TV studio right after Barry and Adam made a futile attempt at impersonating Hall & Oates for a telethon (season 7, episode 21)
- David Leisure as Captain Roger (season 8, episode 1)
- Richard Marx as himself (season 9, episode 15)
- David Hasselhoff as himself (season 10, episode 2)

=== Cameos from real-life counterparts ===
- Chad Kremp as a deli worker (season 1, episode 8), and as Charles Kremp (seasons 4–10)
- J. C. Spink as Joe the Bus Driver (season 1, episode 18)
- "Handsome" Ben Bauman and "Regular" Amy Gross as Double Dare producers (season 3, episode 13)
- Michael C. Levy and Michael Z. Levy as computer technicians (season 4, episode 4)
- Brea Bee as Mrs. Vanica (season 4, episode 14) and as Brea's mother Vicki Bee (season 8, episode 5 and season 9, episode 7)
- R. D. Robb as Paul Sirochman, a photographer (season 4, episode 15; season 6, episode 22; season 7, episode 10)
- Jackie Geary as Lynn Geary (season 4, episode 19; season 5, episode 21; season 6, episode 5)
- Beverly Goldberg, Essie Karp, Virginia Kremp, and Linda Schwartz as a group of elderly friends that Beverly longs to be like (season 5, episode 11)
- Rubén Amaro Jr. as Rubén Amaro Sr. (season 5, episode 11; season 6, episode 6)
- The real-life members of JTP (Barry Goldberg, Matt Bradley, Andy Cogan, Geoff Schwartz, and Rob Smith) all appear at the end of the episodes "Hail Barry" (season 5, episode 14) and "Colors" (season 5, episode 17)
- Eric Goldberg (credited as "My Brother") at the end of "MTV Spring Break" (season 5, episode 18) and (credited as "The Real Eric Goldberg") in "Eight-Bit Goldbergs" (season 6, episode 19)
- Emmy Mirsky (credited under her married name Emily McCoy) as Serry Mirsky, Emmy's mother in "Flashy Little Flashdancer" (season 5, episode 19) and "Hersheypark" (season 6, episode 4)
- Dave Kim appears as himself at the end of "Dave Kim's Party" (season 7, episode 15)

== Episodes ==
Season	Episodes	Originally released		Rank	Viewers (in millions)
Season	Episodes	First released	Last released	Rank	Viewers (in millions)
1	23	September 24, 2013	May 13, 2014	76	6.20
2	24	September 24, 2014	May 13, 2015	57	8.37
3	24	September 23, 2015	May 18, 2016	57	7.62
4	24	September 21, 2016	May 17, 2017	54	6.97
5	22	September 27, 2017	May 16, 2018	66	6.26
6	23	September 26, 2018	May 8, 2019	74	5.74
7	23	September 25, 2019	May 13, 2020	67	5.31
8	22	October 21, 2020	May 19, 2021	69	4.37
9	22	September 22, 2021	May 18, 2022	64	3.92
10	22	September 21, 2022	May 3, 2023	74	3.12

== Production ==
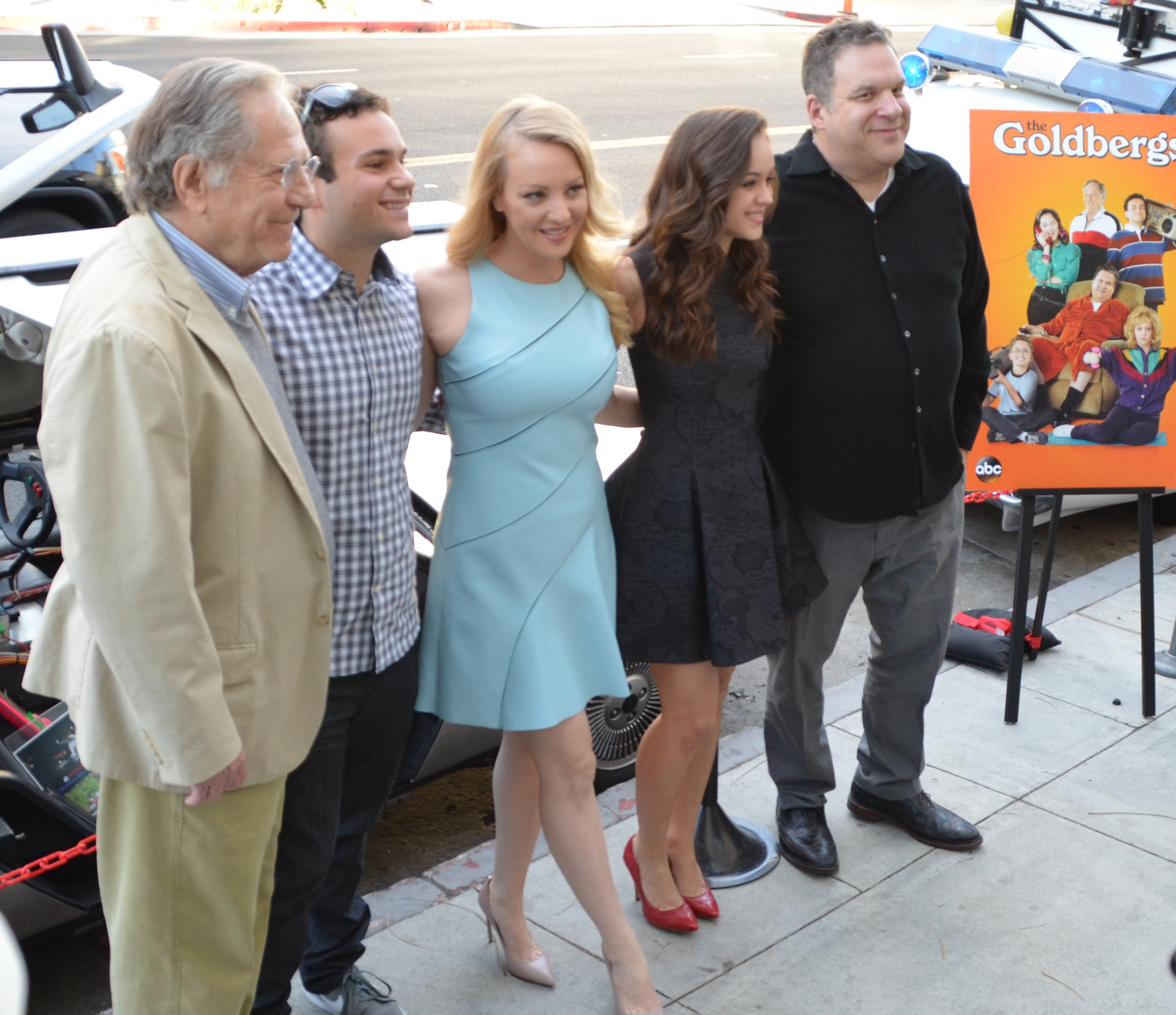
From left to right: Segal, Gentile, McLendon-Covey, Orrantia, and Garlin

=== Casting ===
The project originally received a script commitment from Fox in August 2011. After Adam Goldberg's previous show, Breaking In, was canceled, he did not want to wait for another pilot season to arrive and moved it to ABC, who agreed to produce it immediately. When the project first landed at ABC, the title of the show was to be How the F--- Am I Normal?, before being revised to How the Hell Am I Normal? in early 2013. The final title of the show was first announced by ABC in April 2013.

On January 11, 2013, Wendi McLendon-Covey was cast as the pilot's lead; later, Jeff Garlin and George Segal joined the cast.

George Segal died during the airing of season 8. The April 7, 2021, episode, "Couple Off", which was Segal's last, ended with a 48-second video tribute to the actor, who had died fifteen days earlier due to complications from bypass surgery.

In December 2021, during the airing of season 9, it was announced that Garlin would not return to the show after multiple misconduct allegations and HR investigations. His departure was announced as a mutual decision. For the remainder of the season his character continued to appear on the show, portrayed via the use of outtakes, a stand-in, and CGI. In August 2022, it was revealed that his character was killed off off-screen, prior to the events of the 10th season.

=== Filming ===
The pilot episode was directed by Seth Gordon. On May 10, 2013, ABC picked up the show to series to air in the 2013–14 American television season. It was later picked up for a full season order on November 1, 2013. The show is filmed on a series of stages at Sony Pictures Studios. In March 2020, Sony suspended production due to the COVID-19 pandemic. Sony ultimately resumed production in August 2020. Production was again suspended briefly during January 2021 due to the pandemic.

=== Music ===
The show's theme song, "Rewind", was written at Goldberg's request by I Fight Dragons, his favorite band, specifically for the show. A soundtrack, featuring songs performed on the show by the cast members, was released on December 6, 2017.

== Reception ==
=== Critical reception ===
The Goldbergs first season received mixed reviews, averaging a score of 52% on Metacritic based on reviews from 26 critics. On Rotten Tomatoes, season 1 has an approval rating of 55% based on reviews from 42 critics.

Tim Goodman of The Hollywood Reporter called it "one of the rare freshman comedies to deliver", giving credit to the show's "outstanding writing" and "strong cast". David Wiegand of the San Francisco Chronicle wrote, "you'll immediately like everyone in the family and the jokes derive from credible situations".

Hank Stuever of The Washington Post said the show was "obnoxiously loud". David Hinckley of The New York Daily News said the show is "just awful". Tierney Bricker of E! News gave a more positive review, saying that the show is "like Modern Family mixed with A Christmas Story".

The Goldbergs was included in TV Guide's 2013 Top Twenty "Best Shows of the Year", along with The Hollywood Reporter and Today. In addition, SpoilerTV awarded The Goldbergs with the honor of Best Comedy of 2013–2014.

The second season had a Rotten Tomatoes score of 100% based on reviews from 5 critics. The show continued to be well-received, with Marc Snetiker of Entertainment Weekly calling the season two premiere "the best of any family comedy on TV in the way it eschews dysfunction for its more appropriate, real-world term: love".

After the series was renewed for season 3, ABC network chief Paul Lee stated that both he and ABC believed that the show will be around for "a long time".

=== Nielsen ratings ===
Season	Timeslot (ET)	# Ep.	Premiered			Ended			TV Season	Rank	Viewers (in millions)	Nielsen Rating (18–49)
Season	Timeslot (ET)	# Ep.	Date	Premiere Viewers (in millions)	Premiere 18–49 rating/share	Date	Finale Viewers (in millions)	Finale 18–49 rating/share	TV Season	Rank	Viewers (in millions)	Nielsen Rating (18–49)
1	Tuesday 9:00 pm	23	September 24, 2013	8.94	3.1/8	May 13, 2014	4.26	1.5/5	2013–2014	#76	6.20	N/A
2	Wednesday 8:30 pm	24	September 24, 2014	7.31	2.4/6	May 13, 2015	6.70	2.0/7	2014–2015	#57	8.34	2.8
3	Wednesday 8:30 pm	24	September 23, 2015	7.62	2.4/8	May 18, 2016	6.39	1.9/7	2015–2016	#57	7.62	2.5
4	Wednesday 8:00 pm	24	September 21, 2016	6.90	2.0/8	May 17, 2017	5.27	1.4/6	2016–2017	#54	6.97	2.1
5	Wednesday 8:00 pm	22	September 27, 2017	6.20	1.8/7	May 16, 2018	5.09	1.2/6	2017–2018	#66	6.26	1.8
6	Wednesday 8:00 pm	23	September 26, 2018	5.15	1.4/7	May 8, 2019	4.65	1.1/6	2018–2019	#63	6.38	1.7
7	Wednesday 8:00 pm	23	September 25, 2019	4.44	1.0/6	May 13, 2020	4.13	0.8/3	2019–2020	#67	5.31	1.3
8	Wednesday 8:00 pm	22	October 21, 2020	4.12	0.8/4	May 19, 2021	3.07	0.6/4	2020–2021	#69	4.37	0.9
9	Wednesday 8:00 pm	22	September 22, 2021	3.62	0.7/5	May 18, 2022	2.78	0.4/2	2021–2022	#64	3.92	0.8
10	Wednesday 8:30 pm	22	September 21, 2022	2.53	0.4/2	May 3, 2023	2.54	0.3/1	2022–2023			

== Broadcast ==
The Goldbergs originally premiered on ABC on September 24, 2013. The pilot was made available on Hulu and ABC.com before it premiered on television.

In Australia, the show airs on the Seven Network.

It had been previously broadcast in Canada on CTV. In 2024 it started airing on Global TV and on superstation NTV.

It has been broadcast in the United Kingdom on E4 since April 20, 2015 and also airs on E4's sister network E4 Extra since 2022. formerly in Ireland on RTÉ2 from October 19, 2015 to February 20, 2025, and in Turkey on DiziSmart since 2015.

In France, the series has been broadcast on Comedie+ since October 17, 2015.

The show has been broadcast on Neox TV channel in Spain since May 8, 2016.

In India, the series is aired on Star World.

In Germany, the series has aired since February 16, 2016 on the Disney Channel (seasons 1–2.4), Universal Channel (seasons 2.4–3), Sky 1 (seasons 4–8), Comedy Central (free-to-air seasons 3–7), ProSieben (free-to-air seasons 8–9), Sky Comedy (seasons 9–10). In Portugal, the series is aired on Fox Comedy, while in Italy on Joi (seasons 1–6.16), Premium Stories (seasons 6.17–8), Infinity+ (seasons 9–10) and Italia 1 (free-to-air).

In Israel, it is broadcast by satellite provider yes.

In South Africa, the series had aired on M-Net.

In Hungary, the series was aired on Comedy Central from 2016 to 2020 (Season 1–7). From Season 8, the series continued on Comedy Central Family.

In Ukraine, the series is aired on Paramount Comedy Ukraine.

In New Zealand, the show airs on TVNZ.

=== Syndication ===
The show went into syndication in September 2017 and began airing on local stations on September 11, Nick at Nite on September 18th until its removal on September 22, 2018, and Pop on September 24 until its removal in 2023. The show premiered on TV Land on September 23, 2018 until it was removed as well as of 2023.

== Spin-off ==
In November 2016, it was first reported that ABC was developing a spin-off that would center around recurring character Rick Mellor, played by Bryan Callen. On January 10, 2017, Wendi McClendon-Covey's character was reported as appearing in the script in a guest appearance. The script was ordered to pilot on February 2, 2017.

On March 16, 2017, it was confirmed that Nia Long had been cast as the female lead in the role of Lucy Winston. At the same time, it was confirmed that Tim Meadows would reprise his recurring role from The Goldbergs as Andre Glascott. Jay Chandrasekhar was also confirmed to direct.

On May 17, 2017, ABC passed on the spin-off, despite it reportedly testing very well – going as far to test better than the pilot of the original series. At the same time, Adam F. Goldberg revealed the title of the failed spin-off Schooled.

On January 8, 2018, it was announced that the pilot would air as a special episode of The Goldbergs on January 24, 2018, under the episode title The Goldbergs: 1990-Something. Along with Nia Long as Lucy Winston and Tim Meadows as teacher-turned-principal Andre Glascott (who is also revealed to be Lucy's brother), the pilot also starred Rachel Crow as Lucy's rebellious teenage daughter Felicia, and Summer Parker as Felicia's bubbly younger sister Gigi, with Octavia Spencer narrating as the present-day Felicia.

After the pilot aired, Goldberg had expressed hope that the airing would prompt discussions with ABC that could lead to the series being picked up for the 2018–19 TV season. Three months later, on April 16, 2018, it was announced that ABC had officially picked up the spin-off, Schooled, for a 13-episode season slated to air in 2019. It was also announced that AJ Michalka would reprise her role as Lainey Lewis from The Goldbergs in the new show, but Nia Long will not return to the spin-off due to being a regular cast member on the CBS drama series NCIS: Los Angeles. In May 2020, the series was canceled after two seasons.

Canon status

Series creator Adam F. Goldberg departed after season 6 and publicly stated that seasons 7–10 are not considered canon to his original vision. These later seasons were produced without his creative involvement and diverge from the show's intended autobiographical tone. After Goldberg was not consulted on the series finale, he later wrote the canon finale in comic book form. In Goldberg's comic, published by American Mythology, his family is killed by Victor Crowley to ensure that the new showrunners could never write a reboot or sequel to the show.
