= List of The Goldbergs episodes =

The Goldbergs is an American television sitcom created by Adam F. Goldberg for ABC. The Goldbergs is set in the 1980s and follows the Goldberg family. The series stars Jeff Garlin as husband Murray, Wendi McLendon-Covey as wife Beverly, and their three children. Adam, the youngest, documents their lives with his video camera. The series is based on creator Adam F. Goldberg's childhood in Jenkintown, Pennsylvania, during which he videotaped events, many of which are re-enacted throughout the program.

During the course of the series, 229 episodes of The Goldbergs aired over ten seasons, between September 24, 2013, and May 3, 2023.

== Series overview ==
Season	Episodes	Originally released		Rank	Viewers (in millions)
Season	Episodes	First released	Last released	Rank	Viewers (in millions)
1	23	September 24, 2013	May 13, 2014	76	6.20
2	24	September 24, 2014	May 13, 2015	57	8.37
3	24	September 23, 2015	May 18, 2016	57	7.62
4	24	September 21, 2016	May 17, 2017	54	6.97
5	22	September 27, 2017	May 16, 2018	66	6.26
6	23	September 26, 2018	May 8, 2019	74	5.74
7	23	September 25, 2019	May 13, 2020	67	5.31
8	22	October 21, 2020	May 19, 2021	69	4.37
9	22	September 22, 2021	May 18, 2022	64	3.92
10	22	September 21, 2022	May 3, 2023	74	3.12

== Episodes ==
=== Season 1 (2013–14) ===
No. overall	No. in season	Title	Directed by	Written by	Original release date	Prod. code	U.S. viewers (millions)
1	1	"The Circle of Driving"	Seth Gordon	Adam F. Goldberg	September 24, 2013	100	8.94
2	2	"Daddy Daughter Day"	Seth Gordon	Adam F. Goldberg	October 1, 2013	101	6.06
3	3	"Mini Murray"	Troy Miller	Alex Barnow & Marc Firek	October 8, 2013	102	5.76
4	4	"Why're You Hitting Yourself?"	Jason Ensler	Sally Bradford	October 15, 2013	104	5.05
5	5	"The Ring"	Seth Gordon	Matt Tarses	October 22, 2013	103	5.20
6	6	"Who Are You Going to Telephone?"	Victor Nelli	Chris Bishop	October 29, 2013	105	5.43
7	7	"Call Me When You Get There"	Michael Patrick Jann	Michael J. Weithorn	November 5, 2013	106	4.89
8	8	"The Kremps"	Victor Nelli	Darlene Hunt	November 12, 2013	107	5.12
9	9	"Stop Arguing and Start Thanking"	Matt Sohn	Lew Schneider	November 19, 2013	110	5.03
10	10	"Shopping"	David Katzenberg	Niki Schwartz-Wright	December 3, 2013	108	4.56
11	11	"Kara-te"	Seth Gordon	Andrew Secunda	December 10, 2013	109	4.77
12	12	"You're Under Foot"	Seth Gordon	Michael J. Weithorn	January 7, 2014	112	5.28
13	13	"The Other Smother"	Michael Patrick Jann	Stacey Harmon	January 14, 2014	111	4.89
14	14	"You Opened the Door"	David Katzenberg	Alex Barnow & Marc Firek	January 21, 2014	113	4.71
15	15	"Muscles Mirsky"	Claire Scanlon	Matt Tarses	February 4, 2014	114	4.93
16	16	"Goldbergs Never Say Die!"	David Katzenberg	Adam F. Goldberg & Aaron Kaczander	March 4, 2014	117	4.16
17	17	"Lame Gretzky"	David Katzenberg	Chris Bishop	March 11, 2014	115	4.41
18	18	"For Your Own Good"	Victor Nelli	Niki Schwartz-Wright	March 18, 2014	116	4.74
19	19	"The President's Fitness Test"	Victor Nelli	Chris Bishop & Aaron Kaczander	April 1, 2014	118	4.68
20	20	"You're Not Invited"	Michael Patrick Jann	Lew Schneider	April 8, 2014	119	4.45
21	21	"The Age of Darkness"	Roger Kumble	Stacy Harman & Andrew Secunda	April 29, 2014	120	4.81
22	22	"A Wrestler Named Goldberg"	Ken Marino	Sally Bradford & Vanessa McCarthy	May 6, 2014	121	4.15
23	23	"Livin' on a Prayer"	Claire Scanlon	Chris Bishop & Adam F. Goldberg	May 13, 2014	122	4.26

=== Season 2 (2014–15) ===
No. overall	No. in season	Title	Directed by	Written by	Original release date	Prod. code	U.S. viewers (millions)
24	1	"Love Is a Mixtape"	Seth Gordon	Alex Barnow	September 24, 2014	201	7.31
25	2	"Mama Drama"	David Katzenberg	Teleplay by : Marc Firek; Story by : Marc Firek & Susan Cinoman	October 1, 2014	202	7.09
26	3	"The Facts of Bleeping Life"	Fred Savage	Chris Bishop & Adam F. Goldberg	October 8, 2014	203	7.32
27	4	"Shall We Play a Game?"	David Katzenberg	Niki Schwartz-Wright & Mac Marshall	October 22, 2014	204	7.05
28	5	"Family Takes Care of Beverly"	Claire Scanlon	Lew Schneider	October 29, 2014	207	6.91
29	6	"Big Baby Ball"	David Katzenberg	Marc Firek	November 12, 2014	206	7.54
30	7	"A Goldberg Thanksgiving"	Jay Chandrasekhar	Chris Bishop	November 19, 2014	209	7.70
31	8	"I Rode a Hoverboard"	Victor Nelli Jr.	Robia Rashad	December 3, 2014	205	6.59
32	9	"The Most Handsome Boy on the Planet"	David Katzenberg	Matt Tarses	December 10, 2014	208	7.41
33	10	"DannyDonnieJoeyJonJordan"	David Katzenberg	Steve Basilone & Annie Mebane	January 7, 2015	210	7.79
34	11	"The Darryl Dawkins Dance"	Jay Chandrasekhar	Steve Basilone & Annie Mebane	January 14, 2015	211	7.22
35	12	"Cowboy Country"	David Katzenberg	Stacey Harman	February 11, 2015	212	6.87
36	13	"Van People"	Victor Nelli Jr.	Alex Barnow	February 18, 2015	213	6.84
37	14	"Barry Goldberg's Day Off"	David Katzenberg	Adam F. Goldberg	February 25, 2015	214	7.64
38	15	"Happy Mom, Happy Life"	Claire Scanlon	Andrew Secunda	March 4, 2015	219	7.86
39	16	"The Lost Boy"	David Katzenberg	Josh Goldsmith & Cathy Yuspa	March 25, 2015	220	6.76
40	17	"The Adam Bomb"	Lew Schneider	Chris Bishop	April 1, 2015	217	7.21
41	18	"I Drank the Mold!"	Jon Corn	Aaron Kaczander	April 8, 2015	221	6.54
42	19	"La Biblioteca Es Libros"	David Katzenberg	Marc Firek	April 15, 2015	216	6.87
43	20	"Just Say No!"	Victor Nelli Jr.	Niki Schwartz-Wright	April 15, 2015	215	5.68
44	21	"As You Wish"	David Katzenberg	Alex Barnow	April 22, 2015	218	7.16
45	22	"Dance Party USA"	David Katzenberg	Teleplay by : Andrew Secunda; Story by : Evan Turner	April 29, 2015	222	6.77
46	23	"Bill/Murray"	David Katzenberg	Chris Bishop & Josh Goldsmith	May 6, 2015	223	6.81
47	24	"Goldbergs Feel Hard"	David Katzenberg	Adam F. Goldberg	May 13, 2015	224	6.70

=== Season 3 (2015–16) ===
No. overall	No. in season	Title	Directed by	Written by	Original release date	Prod. code	U.S. viewers (millions)
48	1	"A Kick-Ass Risky Business Party"	Seth Gordon	Chris Bishop	September 23, 2015	301	7.62
49	2	"A Chorus Lie"	David Katzenberg	Marc Firek	September 30, 2015	302	7.39
50	3	"Jimmy 5 is Alive"	Lew Schneider	Alex Barnow	October 7, 2015	303	6.60
51	4	"I Caddyshacked the Pool"	David Katzenberg	Steve Basilone & Annie Mebane	October 14, 2015	304	6.38
52	5	"Boy Barry"	David Katzenberg	David Guarascio	October 21, 2015	306	6.48
53	6	"Couples Costume"	Jay Chandrasekhar	Andy Secunda	October 28, 2015	307	6.88
54	7	"Lucky"	David Katzenberg	Marc Firek	November 11, 2015	308	7.01
55	8	"In Conclusion, Thanksgiving"	Jay Chandrasekhar	Dan Levy	November 18, 2015	305	7.08
56	9	"Wingmom"	David Katzenberg	Lew Schneider & Marty Abbe-Schneider	December 2, 2015	310	6.46
57	10	"A Christmas Story"	Lew Schneider	Lacey Marisa Friedman	December 9, 2015	309	7.02
58	11	"The Tasty Boys"	Christine Gernon	Steve Basilone & Annie Mebane	January 6, 2016	311	6.61
59	12	"Baio and Switch"	David Katzenberg	Alex Barnow	January 13, 2016	312	6.33
60	13	"Double Dare"	David Katzenberg	Chris Bishop	January 20, 2016	314	6.21
61	14	"Lainey Loves Lionel"	Jay Chandrasekhar	Teleplay by : David Guarascio; Story by : Josef Adalian & David Guarascio	February 10, 2016	313	6.19
62	15	"Weird Al"	Jay Chandrasekhar	Lauren Bans	February 17, 2016	315	6.39
63	16	"Edward 'Eddie the Eagle' Edwards"	Jonathan Corn	Dan Levy	February 24, 2016	319	6.45
64	17	"The Dirty Dancing Dance"	David Katzenberg	Teleplay by : Adam F. Goldberg; Story by : Adam F. Goldberg & David Guarascio	March 2, 2016	317	7.08
65	18	"12 Tapes for a Penny"	David Katzenberg	Steve Basilone & Annie Mebane	March 16, 2016	318	6.69
66	19	"Magic Is Real"	Jay Chandrasekhar	Teleplay by : Marc Firek; Story by : Kerri Doherty	March 23, 2016	316	6.73
67	20	"Dungeons and Dragons, Anyone?"	David Katzenberg	Andrew Secunda	April 6, 2016	320	6.17
68	21	"Rush"	Beth McCarthy-Miller	Alex Barnow	April 13, 2016	321	6.29
69	22	"Smother's Day"	David Katzenberg	Story by : Marc Firek; Teleplay by : Chris Bishop	May 4, 2016	323	6.67
70	23	"Big Orange"	David Katzenberg	Rob Lieber	May 11, 2016	322	6.20
71	24	"Have a Summer"	David Katzenberg	Story by : Adam F. Goldberg; Teleplay by : Chris Bishop	May 18, 2016	324	6.39

=== Season 4 (2016–17) ===
No. overall	No. in season	Title	Directed by	Written by	Original release date	Prod. code	U.S. viewers (millions)
72	1	"Breakfast Club"	David Katzenberg	Marc Firek	September 21, 2016	401	6.90
73	2	"I Heart Video Dating"	Peter Ellis	Alex Barnow	September 28, 2016	402	6.58
74	3	"George! George Glass!"	Joanna Kerns	Aaron Kaczander	October 5, 2016	404	6.23
75	4	"Crazy Calls"	Lew Schneider	Steve Basilone	October 12, 2016	405	6.47
76	5	"Stefan King"	David Katzenberg	Chris Bishop	October 26, 2016	406	6.14
77	6	"Recipe for Death II: Kiss the Cook"	Lew Schneider	Brian Hennelly	November 9, 2016	403	6.46
78	7	"Ho-ly K.I.T.T."	Lea Thompson	Andrew Secunda	November 16, 2016	410	6.45
79	8	"The Greatest Musical Ever Written"	Lew Schneider	Annie Mebane	November 30, 2016	407	5.96
80	9	"Globetrotters"	Richie Keen	Adam Armus	December 7, 2016	408	5.40
81	10	"Han Ukkah Solo"	Joanna Kerns	Dan Levy	December 14, 2016	409	6.20
82	11	"O Captain! My Captain!"	Richie Keen	Marc Firek	January 4, 2017	412	6.73
83	12	"Snow Day"	Victor Nelli, Jr.	Lauren Bans	January 11, 2017	413	6.92
84	13	"Agassi"	David Katzenberg	Chris Bishop	February 8, 2017	416	6.19
85	14	"The Spencer's Gift"	Jay Chandrasekhar	Alex Barnow	February 15, 2017	414	6.50
86	15	"So Swayze It’s Crazy"	Jay Chandrasekhar	Lacey Friedman	February 22, 2017	411	6.21
87	16	"The Kara-te Kid"	Anton Cropper	Adam F. Goldberg	March 1, 2017	415	6.17
88	17	"Deadheads"	Jason Blount	Adam Armus	March 8, 2017	418	5.70
89	18	"Baré"	Jay Chandrasekhar	Steve Basilone	March 15, 2017	419	5.42
90	19	"A Night to Remember"	Lew Schneider	Chris Bishop	March 29, 2017	420	6.07
91	20	"The Dynamic Duo"	Kevin Smith	Andrew Secunda	April 5, 2017	417	5.63
92	21	"Fonzie Scheme"	Jude Weng	Matt Mira & Erik Weiner	April 26, 2017	421	5.23
93	22	"The Day After the Day After"	Jay Chandrasekhar	Alex Barnow	May 3, 2017	422	5.16
94	23	"Jedi Master Adam Skywalker"	Lew Schneider	Dan Levy	May 10, 2017	423	5.22
95	24	"Graduation Day"	Kevin Smith	Matthew Edsall & Hans Rodionoff	May 17, 2017	424	5.27

=== Season 5 (2017–18) ===
No. overall	No. in season	Title	Directed by	Written by	Original release date	Prod. code	U.S. viewers (millions)
96	1	"Weird Science"	David Katzenberg	Chris Bishop	September 27, 2017	501	6.20
97	2	"Hogan Is My Grandfather"	Lew Schneider	Marc Firek	October 4, 2017	502	5.79
98	3	"Goldberg on The Goldbergs"	David Katzenberg	David Guarascio	October 11, 2017	503	5.66
99	4	"Revenge o' the Nerds"	David Katzenberg	Jennifer Irwin	October 18, 2017	506	5.62
100	5	"Jackie Likes Star Trek"	Lea Thompson	Andrew Secunda	October 25, 2017	505	5.49
101	6	"Girl Talk"	Jay Chandrasekhar	Steve Basilone	November 1, 2017	504	4.99
102	7	"A Wall Street Thanksgiving"	Lew Schneider	Lauren Bans	November 15, 2017	507	5.63
103	8	"The Circle of Driving Again"	Lew Schneider	Alex Barnow	November 29, 2017	508	5.63
104	9	"Parents Just Don't Understand"	David Katzenberg	Dan Levy	December 6, 2017	509	5.43
105	10	"We Didn't Start the Fire"	Jay Chandrasekhar	Daisy Gardner	December 13, 2017	510	6.10
106	11	"The Goldberg Girls"	Lea Thompson	Marc Firek	January 3, 2018	511	5.90
107	12	"Dinner with the Goldbergs"	Joanna Kerns	Andrew Secunda	January 10, 2018	512	6.05
108	13	"The Hooters"	Lew Schneider	Brian Hennelly	January 17, 2018	513	6.52
–	–	"The Goldbergs: 1990-Something"	Jay Chandrasekhar	Teleplay by : Marc Firek; Story by : Adam F. Goldberg & Marc Firek	January 24, 2018	SPE	6.09
109	14	"Hail Barry"	Melissa Joan Hart	David Guarascio	February 28, 2018	514	5.44
110	15	"Adam Spielberg"	David Katzenberg	Teleplay by : Steve Basilone; Story by : Adam F. Goldberg	March 7, 2018	515	5.58
111	16	"The Scrunchie Rule"	David Katzenberg	Chris Bishop	March 21, 2018	517	5.73
112	17	"Colors"	Jay Chandrasekhar	Annie Mebane	March 28, 2018	516	5.49
113	18	"MTV Spring Break"	Jay Chandrasekhar	Matt Mira	April 4, 2018	520	5.37
114	19	"Flashy Little Flashdancer"	Jason Blount	Erik Weiner	April 11, 2018	521	5.22
115	20	"The Opportunity of a Lifetime"	Anton Cropper	Alex Barnow	May 2, 2018	518	4.79
116	21	"Spaceballs"	Lew Schneider	Aaron Kaczander	May 9, 2018	519	4.74
117	22	"Let's Val Kilmer This Car"	Lew Schneider	Matthew Edsall & Adam Olsen & Hans Rodionoff	May 16, 2018	522	5.09

=== Season 6 (2018–19) ===
No. overall	No. in season	Title	Directed by	Written by	Original release date	Prod. code	U.S. viewers (millions)
118	1	"Sixteen Candles"	Lew Schneider	Alex Barnow	September 26, 2018	601	5.15
119	2	"You Got Zuko'd"	Jason Blount	David Guarascio	October 3, 2018	602	5.13
120	3	"RAD!"	Lew Schneider	Dan Levy	October 10, 2018	603	5.05
121	4	"Hersheypark"	Jay Chandrasekhar	Daisy Gardner	October 17, 2018	604	4.90
122	5	"Mister Knifey-Hands"	Lew Schneider	Andrew Secunda	October 24, 2018	605	4.97
123	6	"Fiddler"	Jason Blount	Chris Bishop	October 31, 2018	606	4.79
124	7	"Bohemian Rap City"	Jay Chandrasekhar	Chris Bishop	November 7, 2018	607	5.12
125	8	"The Living Room: A 100% True Story"	Lew Schneider	Lauren Bans	November 28, 2018	609	4.94
126	9	"Bachelor Party"	Christine Lakin	Mike Sikowitz	December 5, 2018	610	4.88
127	10	"Yippee Ki Yay Melon Farmer"	Richie Keen	Aaron Kaczander	December 12, 2018	608	5.29
128	11	"The Wedding Singer"	Lew Schneider	Rachel Sweet	January 9, 2019	611	5.18
129	12	"The Pina Colada Episode"	Lea Thompson	Erik Weiner	January 16, 2019	612	4.80
130	13	"I Coulda Been a Lawyer"	Jay Chandrasekhar	Steve Basilone	January 23, 2019	614	5.53
131	14	"Major League'd"	Lea Thompson	Alex Barnow	January 30, 2019	615	5.64
132	15	"My Valentine Boy"	Lew Schneider	Matt Mira	February 13, 2019	613	4.77
133	16	"There Can Be Only One Highlander Club"	Lew Schneider	Donielle Muransky & Alison Rich	February 20, 2019	617	4.98
134	17	"Our Perfect Strangers"	Kevin Smith	Mike Sikowitz	February 27, 2019	616	4.23
135	18	"The Beverly Goldberg Cookbook"	Fred Savage	Hans Rodionoff	March 13, 2019	618	4.75
136	19	"Eight-bit Goldbergs"	Jay Chandrasekhar	Lauren Bans	March 20, 2019	619	4.53
137	20	"This is This is Spinal Tap"	Ryan Krayser	Rachel Sweet & Adam Olsen	April 3, 2019	620	4.39
138	21	"I Lost on Jeopardy"	Lew Schneider	Chris Bishop & Alex Barnow	April 10, 2019	622	4.63
139	22	"Mom Trumps Willow"	Vern Davidson	Andrew Secunda	May 1, 2019	621	4.50
140	23	"Breakin'"	Jason Blount	Adam F. Goldberg & Susan Cinoman	May 8, 2019	623	4.65

=== Season 7 (2019–20) ===
No. overall	No. in season	Title	Directed by	Written by	Original release date	Prod. code	U.S. viewers (millions)
141	1	"Vacation"	Lew Schneider	Alex Barnow & Chris Bishop	September 25, 2019	701	4.44
142	2	"Dana's Back"	Jay Chandrasekhar	Teleplay by : Mike Sikowitz; Story by : Adam F. Goldberg & Mike Sikowitz	October 2, 2019	702	4.27
143	3	"Food in a Geoffy"	Lew Schneider	Story by : Adam F. Goldberg; Teleplay by : Matt Roller	October 9, 2019	703	4.49
144	4	"Animal House"	Jay Chandrasekhar	Bill Callahan	October 16, 2019	704	4.10
145	5	"Parents Thursday"	Melissa Joan Hart	Teleplay by : Aaron Kaczander; Story by : Adam F. Goldberg & Aaron Kaczander	October 23, 2019	705	3.91
146	6	"A 100% True Ghost Story"	Christine Lakin	Teleplay by : Amy Mass; Story by : Adam F. Goldberg & Amy Mass	October 30, 2019	706	4.02
147	7	"WrestleMania"	Lew Schneider	Teleplay by : Erik Weiner; Story by : Adam F. Goldberg & Erik Weiner	November 6, 2019	707	4.22
148	8	"Angst-Giving"	Melissa Joan Hart	Teleplay by : Elizabeth Beckwith; Story by : Adam F. Goldberg	November 20, 2019	709	4.11
149	9	"The Beverly Goldberg Cookbook: Part 2"	Lea Thompson	Story by : Adam F. Goldberg & Alison Rich; Teleplay by : Alison Rich	December 4, 2019	708	4.10
150	10	"It's a Wonderful Life"	Eric Dean Seaton	Story by : Adam F. Goldberg & Aadip Desai; Teleplay by : Aadip Desai	December 11, 2019	710	3.94
151	11	"Pickleball"	Lew Schneider	Story by : Adam F. Goldberg & Langan Kingsley; Teleplay by : Langan Kingsley	January 15, 2020	711	3.59
152	12	"Game Night"	Nora Kirkpatrick	Story by : Adam F. Goldberg & Kristen Lange; Teleplay by : Kristen Lange	January 22, 2020	712	4.08
153	13	"Geoff the Pleaser"	Christine Lakin	Mike Sikowitz	January 29, 2020	714	3.97
154	14	"Preventa Mode"	Vern Davidson	Bill Callahan	February 12, 2020	716	3.88
155	15	"Dave Kim's Party"	Lew Schneider	Story by : Adam F. Goldberg & Matt Roller; Teleplay by : Matt Roller	February 19, 2020	713	3.97
156	16	"Body Swap"	Lew Schneider	Marc Firek	February 26, 2020	715	3.76
157	17	"A Fish Story"	Lew Schneider	Amy Mass	March 18, 2020	717	4.84
158	18	"Schmoopie's Big Adventure"	Jason Blount	Erik Weiner	March 25, 2020	718	4.66
159	19	"Island Time"	Robert Cohen	Annie Mebane	April 1, 2020	719	4.42
160	20	"The Return of the Formica King"	Lea Thompson	Aaron Kaczander	April 15, 2020	723	4.37
161	21	"Oates & Oates"	Lew Schneider	Alex Barnow & Chris Bishop	April 22, 2020	720	4.24
162	22	"The Fake-Up"	Lew Schneider	Alex Barnow & Chris Bishop	May 6, 2020	722	4.32
163	23	"Pretty in Pink"	Ryan Krayser	Alex Barnow & Chris Bishop	May 13, 2020	721	4.13

=== Season 8 (2020–21) ===
No. overall	No. in season	Title	Directed by	Written by	Original release date	Prod. code	U.S. viewers (millions)
164	1	"Airplane!"	Eric Dean Seaton	David Guarascio	October 21, 2020	801	4.13
165	2	"The Prettiest Boy in School"	Lew Schneider	Matt Roller	October 21, 2020	802	4.13
166	3	"It's All About Comptrol"	Lew Schneider	Mike Sikowitz	October 28, 2020	803	3.66
167	4	"Bill's Wedding"	Christine Lakin	Teleplay by : Alex Barnow & Chris Bishop; Story by : Mike Sikowitz	November 4, 2020	804	3.78
168	5	"Dee-Vorced"	Lew Schneider	Teleplay by : Bill Callahan; Story by : Bill Callahan & Adam F. Goldberg	November 18, 2020	805	3.72
169	6	"Eracism"	Eric Dean Seaton	Peter Dirksen & Jonathan Howard	November 25, 2020	807	3.67
170	7	"Hanukkah on the Seas"	Jason Blount	Annie Mebane	December 2, 2020	806	3.94
171	8	"Bevy's Big Murder Mystery Party"	Lew Schneider	Aaron Kaczander	January 13, 2021	808	3.83
172	9	"Cocoon"	Christine Lakin	Elizabeth Beckwith	January 27, 2021	809	3.37
173	10	"Geoff's New Hat"	Lew Schneider	Langan Kingsley	February 3, 2021	810	3.24
174	11	"Quaker Warden"	Vern Davidson	Erik Weiner	February 10, 2021	811	3.31
175	12	"The Lasagna You Deserve"	Eric Dean Seaton	Mike Sikowitz	February 24, 2021	812	3.72
176	13	"Mr. Ships Ahoy"	Lew Schneider	Matt Roller	March 3, 2021	813	3.50
177	14	"Love Triangle"	Jay Chandrasekhar	David Guarascio	March 24, 2021	814	3.42
178	15	"Bever-lé"	Lew Schneider	Bill Callahan	March 31, 2021	815	3.20
179	16	"Couple Off"	Lea Thompson	Annie Mebane	April 7, 2021	816	3.37
180	17	"Who's Afraid of Brea Bee?"	Lew Schneider	Peter Dirksen & Jonathan Howard	April 14, 2021	817	3.28
181	18	"The Dating Game"	Ryan Krayser	Vicky Castro	April 21, 2021	818	3.30
182	19	"Daddy Daughter Day 2"	Mary Lambert	Aaron Kaczander & Erik Weiner	April 28, 2021	819	3.12
183	20	"Poker Night"	Lew Schneider	Langan Kingsley & Elizabeth Beckwith	May 5, 2021	820	2.85
184	21	"Alligator Schwartz"	Nicole Treston Abranian	Dan Bailey	May 12, 2021	821	3.02
185	22	"The Proposal"	Lew Schneider	Alex Barnow & Chris Bishop	May 19, 2021	822	3.07

=== Season 9 (2021–22) ===
No. overall	No. in season	Title	Directed by	Written by	Original release date	Prod. code	U.S. viewers (millions)
186	1	"The Goldbergs' Excellent Adventure"	Lew Schneider	David Guarascio	September 22, 2021	901	3.62
187	2	"Horse Play"	Lew Schneider	Mike Sikowitz	September 29, 2021	902	3.17
188	3	"Riptide Waters"	Jason Blount	Peter Dirksen & Jonathan Howard	October 6, 2021	903	3.25
189	4	"The William Penn Years"	Jason Blount	Aaron Kaczander	October 13, 2021	904	3.21
190	5	"An Itch Like No Other"	Christine Lakin	David Guarascio	October 20, 2021	905	2.91
191	6	"The Hunt for the Great Albino Pumpkin"	Christine Lakin	Elizabeth Beckwith	October 27, 2021	906	3.23
192	7	"The Rose-Kissy Thing"	Jay Chandrasekhar	Mike Sikowitz	November 3, 2021	907	3.28
193	8	"A Light Thanksgiving Nosh"	Nicole Treston Abranian	Peter Dirksen & Jonathan Howard	November 17, 2021	909	3.43
194	9	"Tennis People"	Jay Chandrasekhar	Chris Bishop & Alex Barnow	December 1, 2021	908	3.15
195	10	"You Only Die Once, or Twice, But Never Three Times"	Nicole Treston Abranian	Vicky Castro	January 5, 2022	910	3.36
196	11	"Hip-Shaking and Booty-Quaking"	Christine Lakin	Aaron Kaczander	January 12, 2022	911	3.50
197	12	"The Kissing Bandits"	Christine Lakin	Elizabeth Beckwith	January 19, 2022	912	3.17
198	13	"A Peck of Familial Love"	Princess Monique	Andrew Secunda	February 2, 2022	913	3.48
199	14	"The Steve Weekend"	Vern Davidson	Vicky Castro	February 23, 2022	914	3.21
200	15	"The Wedding"	Matt Mira	Chris Bishop & Alex Barnow	March 2, 2022	915	3.31
201	16	"The Downtown Boys"	Matt Mira	Erik Weiner	March 16, 2022	916	2.79
202	17	"The Strangest Affair of All Time"	Lew Schneider	Carly Garber & Aleah Welsh	March 23, 2022	917	2.94
203	18	"School-ercise"	Lew Schneider	Chris Bishop & Alex Barnow	April 13, 2022	918	2.95
204	19	"Grand Theft Scooter"	Nicole Treston Abranian	David Guarascio	April 20, 2022	919	2.97
205	20	"Sunday Chow-Fun Day"	Nicole Treston Abranian	Mike Sikowitz	May 4, 2022	920	2.98
206	21	"One Exquisite Evening With Madonna"	Lew Schneider	Alex Barnow & Chris Bishop	May 11, 2022	921	2.63
207	22	"Adam Graduates!"	Lew Schneider	Alex Barnow & Chris Bishop	May 18, 2022	922	2.78

=== Season 10 (2022–23) ===
No. overall	No. in season	Title	Directed by	Written by	Original release date	Prod. code	U.S. viewers (millions)
208	1	"If You Build It"	Lew Schneider	Elizabeth Beckwith	September 21, 2022	1001	2.53
209	2	"That's a Schwartz Man"	Lew Schneider	David Guarascio	September 28, 2022	1002	2.14
210	3	"Jenkintown After Dark"	David Katzenberg	Mike Sikowitz	October 5, 2022	1003	2.25
211	4	"Man of the House"	David Katzenberg	Vanessa McCarthy	October 12, 2022	1004	2.40
212	5	"Uncle-ing"	Jason Blount	Mike Sikowitz	October 19, 2022	1005	2.32
213	6	"DKNY"	Jason Blount	Elizabeth Beckwith	October 26, 2022	1006	2.58
214	7	"Rhinestones and Roses"	Princess Monique	David Guarascio	November 2, 2022	1007	2.54
215	8	"Another Turkey in the Trot"	Princess Monique	Alex Barnow & Chris Bishop	November 16, 2022	1008	2.64
216	9	"Million Dollar Reward"	Lew Schneider	Mike Sikowitz	November 30, 2022	1009	2.52
217	10	"Worst Grinch Ever"	Lew Schneider	Vanessa McCarthy	December 7, 2022	1010	2.51
218	11	"Blade Runner: The Musical"	Princess Monique	Erik Weiner	January 11, 2023	1011	2.63
219	12	"Amadoofus"	Princess Monique	David Guarascio	January 18, 2023	1012	2.69
220	13	"Moms Need Other Moms"	Nicole Treston Abranian	Aaron Kaczander	February 15, 2023	1013	2.26
221	14	"Two-Timing Goldbergs"	Nicole Treston Abranian	Andrew Secunda	February 22, 2023	1014	2.42
222	15	"The Crush"	Christine Lakin	Alison Wong	March 1, 2023	1015	2.27
223	16	"The Better Annie"	Christine Lakin	Elizabeth Beckwith	March 8, 2023	1016	2.46
224	17	"A Flyer's Path to Victory"	Lea Thompson	Vanessa McCarthy	March 15, 2023	1017	2.46
225	18	"Love Shack"	Lea Thompson	Andrew Secunda	April 5, 2023	1018	2.28
226	19	"Flowers for Barry"	Melissa Kosar	David Guarascio	April 12, 2023	1019	2.15
227	20	"Uptown Boy"	Lew Schneider	Peter Dirksen & Jonathan Howard	April 19, 2023	1020	2.39
228	21	"Push It"	Lew Schneider	Chris Bishop & Alex Barnow	April 26, 2023	1021	2.07
229	22	"Bev to the Future"	Melissa Kosar	Mike Sikowitz	May 3, 2023	1022	2.54

== Specials ==
Title	Directed by	Written by	Original release date	U.S. viewers (millions)
"An 80s Rewind"	N/A	N/A	April 27, 2016	5.79
Cast members discuss their real-life characters of the Goldberg family and what makes the 1980s so special to them. Crew members talk about what goes into filming the series, take a look behind-the-scenes on set, and share bloopers.
"The Goldbergs: 1990-Something"	Jay Chandrasekhar	Story by : Adam F. Goldberg & Marc Firek; Teleplay by : Marc Firek	January 24, 2018	6.09
In what is described as the pilot for a spinoff set in the 1990s and featuring characters from William Penn Academy, Mr. Glascott replaces Mr. Ball as the school principal and hires his sister, a single mother with two teenage daughters, to serve as his new secretary, while the girls get to attend the school for free. Mr. Glascott and Coach Mellor disagree on the best way to teach the children. NOTE: This backdoor pilot was picked up to series by ABC, and premiered in early 2019 with the title Schooled. Featured Song: "I Want It That Way" by Backstreet Boys

== Ratings ==
The Goldbergs : U.S. viewers per episode (millions)

Season	Episode number																							
Season	1	2	3	4	5	6	7	8	9	10	11	12	13	14	15	16	17	18	19	20	21	22	23	24
1	8.94	6.06	5.76	5.05	5.20	5.43	4.89	5.12	5.03	4.56	4.77	5.28	4.89	4.71	4.93	4.16	4.41	4.74	4.68	4.45	4.81	4.15	4.26	–
2	7.31	7.09	7.32	7.05	6.91	7.54	7.70	6.59	7.41	7.79	7.22	6.87	6.84	7.64	7.86	6.76	7.21	6.54	6.87	5.68	7.16	6.77	6.81	6.70
3	7.62	7.39	6.60	6.38	6.48	6.88	7.01	7.08	6.46	7.02	6.61	6.33	6.21	6.19	6.39	6.45	7.08	6.69	6.73	6.17	6.29	6.67	6.20	6.39
4	6.90	6.58	6.23	6.47	6.14	6.46	6.45	5.96	5.40	6.20	6.73	6.92	6.19	6.50	6.21	6.17	5.70	5.42	6.07	5.63	5.23	5.16	5.22	5.27
5	6.20	5.79	5.66	6.62	5.49	4.99	5.63	5.64	5.43	6.10	5.90	6.05	6.52	5.44	5.58	5.73	5.49	5.37	5.22	4.79	4.74	5.09	–	
6	5.15	5.13	5.05	4.90	4.97	4.79	5.12	4.94	4.88	5.29	5.18	4.80	5.53	5.64	4.77	4.98	4.23	4.75	4.53	4.39	4.63	4.50	4.65	–
7	4.44	4.27	4.49	4.10	3.91	4.02	4.22	4.11	4.10	3.94	3.59	4.08	3.97	3.88	3.97	3.76	4.84	4.66	4.42	4.37	4.24	4.32	4.13	–
8	4.12	4.12	3.66	3.78	3.72	3.67	3.94	3.83	3.37	3.24	3.31	3.72	3.50	3.42	3.20	3.37	3.28	3.30	3.12	2.85	3.02	3.07	–	
9	3.62	3.17	3.25	3.21	2.91	3.23	3.28	3.43	3.15	3.36	3.50	3.17	3.48	3.21	3.31	2.79	2.94	2.95	2.97	2.98	2.63	2.78	–	
10	2.53	2.14	2.25	2.40	2.32	2.58	2.54	2.64	2.52	2.51	2.63	2.69	2.26	2.42	2.27	2.46	2.46	2.28	2.15	2.39	2.07	2.54	–	

Audience measurement performed by Nielsen Media Research
