= Beth Triffon =

American actress

- Born: September 15, 1993 (age 32)
- Occupation: Actress
- Years active: 2010–present

Beth Triffon (born September 15, 1993) is an American actress. She is best known for playing Joanne Schwartz in the sitcom The Goldbergs and Gracie in the sitcom The F-List.

== Early life ==
Triffon was born to Barb Jenkins Triffon. She started acting at the Columbus Children's Theatre where she caught the eye of former director Bill Goldsmith. She gained acting experience at the Fort Hayes Metropolitan Education Center. She gained a bachelor's degree from the Otterbein University.

== Career ==
Triffon's first big role was playing Gracie on the sitcom The F-List, which she also created with fellow actor Sean Edwards. Her first big role came playing Joanne Schwartz in the sitcom series The Goldbergs. In 2016, Triffon won the ABC Discovers: Digital Talent Competition, ABC Talent and Casting beating out 9 other competitors. In 2021, it was revealed she was the victim of sexist comments. While on a 2013 episode of the podcast The Randumb Show, Mike Richards, host of the podcast, referred to Triffon's character as a booth slut.

== Personal life ==
Triffon is married to Kerry Henderson. Together they founded Stage Left Creative in 2013, which specialises in directing music videos and live performances.

== Filmography ==
=== Film ===
Year	Title	Role	Notes
2010	Gleeclipse	Lead Actress	Short
2012	Sweetheart	Rainey	Short
2013	LoveDumb	Laura	
2016	Almost	Beth	Short
2017	Non-Transferable	Kerry	
2018	Top Ramen	Tracey	Short
2018	Snowflakes	Beth	
2018	Bull Mountain Lookout	Young Rodgie	Short
2019	Patricia	Beth	Short
2020	A Nighttime Thoughts	Girl	Short
2020	A Knight's Heart	Pert Verner	
2024	Playing House	Beth	Short
2026	Fluff	Woman	Short

=== Television ===
Year	Title	Role	Notes
2010	Asylum	Rachael Mendez	
2011-2012	The F-List	Gracie	12 episodes
2014	The McCarthys	Julie	Episode; Love, McCarthys Style
2015	We the Internet TV	Devora Silverstein	Episode; Trigger Warnings
2016	Dr. Ken	Waitress	Episode; Dr Ken: Child of Divorce
2016	The Middle	Marcy	Episode; Look Who's Not Cooking
2017	Fresh Off the Boat	College Kid#2	Episode; The Flush
2017	Ten Days in the Valley	Mackenzie	6 episodes
2018	Swedish Dicks	Teddy Marks	Episode; Dawn of the Dicks
2018	Standup and Away! With Brian Regan	Beth	Episode; Episode 1
2019	American Princess	Meredith	Episode; Just Boob Stuff
2019	Veronica Mars	Manager Kelly	2 episodes
2020	9-1-1	Katie	Episode; Seize the Day
2021	On the Verge	Rowena	Episode; Almost Two Months Earlier
2020-2021	The Pack Podcast	Gigi, Blair, Brittany	6 episodes
2023	Tiny Beautiful Things	Young Amy	Episode; The Ghost Ship
2023	Jury Duty	Hostess	Episode; Field Trip
2020-2023	The Goldbergs	Joanne Schwartz	32 episodes
2024	Nobody Wants This	Jess	Episode; A Shiksa Walks Into a Temple
2025	The Rookie	Priscilla Robbins	Episode; Mutiny and the Bounty
2025	HOA	Beth Pimentel	8 episodes
