= Doug Robinson (producer) =

American media executive and producer

- Education: Syracuse University (B.A.)
- Occupation: Media executive
- Known for: Chairman and Chief Executive Officer of Doug Robinson Productions

Doug Robinson is an American media executive and producer.

== Biography ==
Robinson was born to a Jewish family. In 1985, he graduated with a double major in television-radio-film and marketing management from Syracuse University's S. I. Newhouse School of Public Communications. After school, he moved to California and worked as an agent for Creative Artists Agency and Endeavor Talent Agency after which, leveraging his network of contacts in the industry, began producing on his own. In 2002, Robinson was appointed the head of TV at Adam Sandler's Happy Madison Productions. He produced Rules of Engagement for CBS, Imaginary Mary, and The Goldbergs for ABC. In 2017, Robinson signed a four-year agreement with Sony Pictures Television that will have him launch his own production company, Doug Robinson Productions (DRP). He will be joined by producer Alison Greenspan who will focus on development of dramas; and Matt Mosko who will focus on producing comedies. In September 2017, DRP sold its first family comedy series to ABC.

== Filmography ==
- Rules of Engagement (2007–13)
- Pretend Time (2010–11)
- Breaking In (2011–12)
- The Goldbergs (2013–23)
- Imaginary Mary (2017)
- Schooled (2019–20)
- Indebted (2020)
- For Life (2020–21)
