= Adam F. Goldberg =

American television and film producer

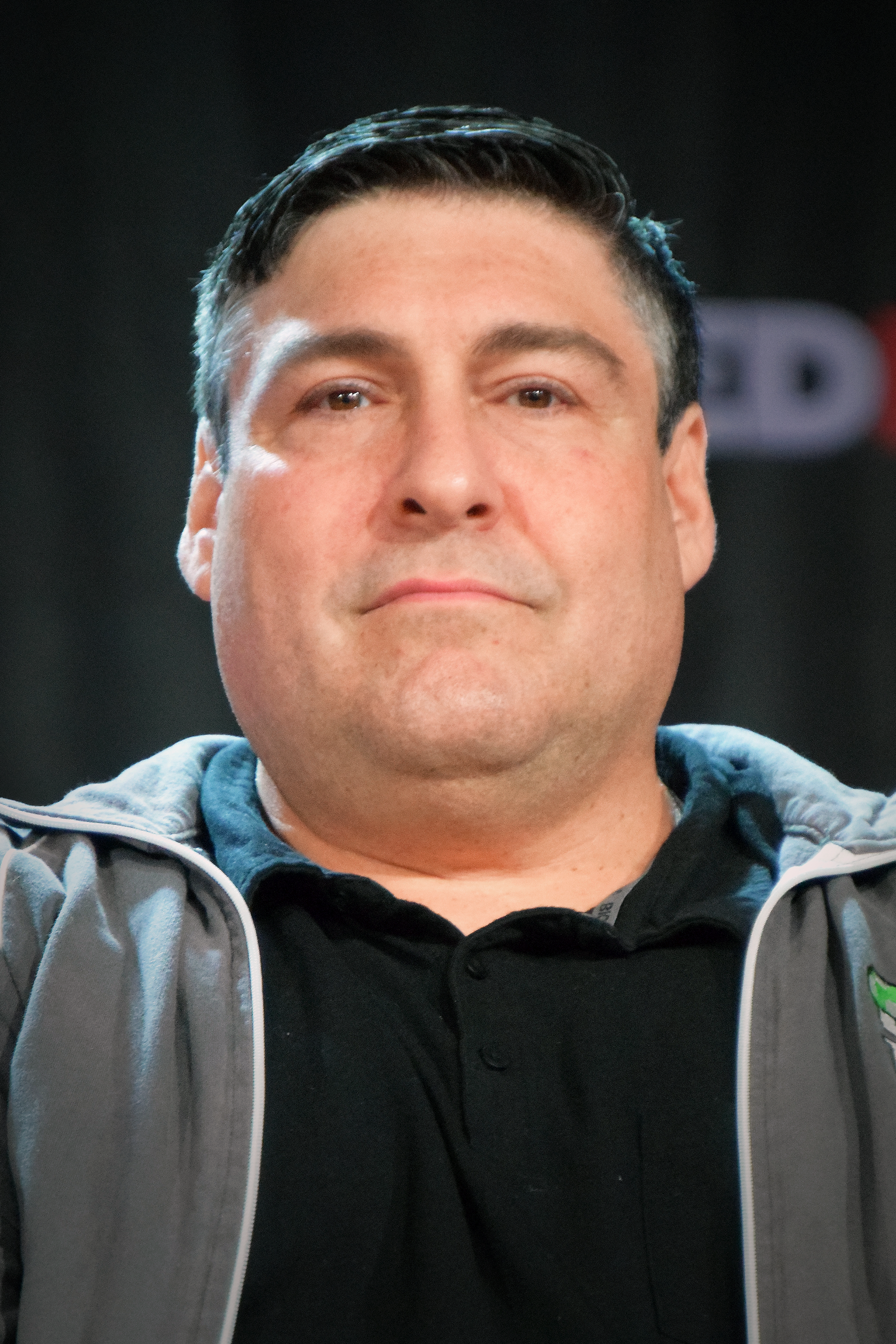
- Goldberg at the 2022 New York Comic Con
- Born: Adam Frederick Goldberg; April 2, 1976 (age 50); Philadelphia, Pennsylvania, U.S.
- Occupations: Television producer; film producer; writer
- Spouse: Sara Goldberg

Adam Frederick Goldberg (born April 2, 1976) is an American television and film producer, and writer. Goldberg is best known as the creator and showrunner of The Goldbergs, a television sitcom based on his childhood in which he is portrayed by Sean Giambrone with Patton Oswalt taking on the role of narrating the show. He also created and led the sitcoms Breaking In, Imaginary Mary, and Schooled, a spin-off of The Goldbergs.

== Early life and work ==
Goldberg was born to a Jewish family in Philadelphia, Pennsylvania, and lived in nearby Jenkintown. His parents are Beverly Goldberg (née Solomon) (born October 8, 1943) and Murray Goldberg (September 25, 1940 – February 1, 2008); he is the youngest of three sons, with brothers Eric (born August 18, 1967) and Barry (born October 15, 1969). He produced his first play, Dr. Pickup, in 1992 at the age of 15, and won the Philadelphia Young Playwrights Festival. He attended Stagedoor Manor, a performing arts camp.

His plays were performed in venues such as the Sundance Playwrights Lab, the Illusion Theater, The Greenwich Street Theater, The Saint Marks Theatre, The Tada! Theater, The Walnut Street Theater and the Joseph Papp Theater.

He was a finalist for the American Theater Critics Association's 1997 Osborn Award for his full-length play, One on One.

His dramedy The Purple Heart was produced by the Institute for Arts and Education at the Annenberg Theater and also won first place in The Very Special Arts Playwriting Award and was produced at the John F. Kennedy Center for the Performing Arts in Washington, D.C.

== Career ==
=== Screenwriting ===
Goldberg's first comedy-writing job began in 2003 for the sitcom Still Standing, where he worked for four years and finished as a co-producer. After his first year on Still Standing, he teamed up with Picture Machine, Trigger Street Productions, and college friend Kyle Newman to develop the screenplay for Fanboys. After a year, they sold it to The Weinstein Company. The screenplay ended up seventh on the 2005 Black List for most popular unproduced scripts of the year.

After the success of Fanboys, Goldberg was hired to write the screenplays for The Jetsons; a 2007 remake of Revenge of the Nerds (1984) starring Adam Brody, which was cancelled after three weeks of filming; Aliens in the Attic; and The Muppets' Wizard of Oz. He also spent a year writing on DreamWorks Animation's How to Train Your Dragon, before moving over to write Monsters vs. Aliens: Mutant Pumpkins from Outer Space as well as the 2011 How to Train Your Dragon Christmas special, Gift of the Night Fury. He is currently adapting the graphic novel Seal Team 7 for director Shawn Levy, and bringing the book Simon Bloom: Gravity Keeper to the screen for Walden Media. Goldberg has also produced several movies, including The Comebacks, Daddy Day Camp, Bobism, Jeff the Immortal, and a remake of Night of the Living Dorks. Goldberg also produced the documentary Mike Mignola: Drawing Monsters, which explores the life and work of comic creator Mike Mignola.

=== Television ===
On the television side, Goldberg teamed up with Adam Sandler's production company Happy Madison to write four pilots for various networks. In 2010, Happy Madison introduced him to King of Kong director Seth Gordon and together they created the 2011 Fox comedy series Breaking In. The show was pitched as "The Office meets The A-Team" and, after a year of development, was picked up to series. Before Breaking In, Goldberg also wrote on the shows Aliens in America, Secret Girlfriend, Voltron Force, WordGirl and Kevin Williamson's Glory Days.

In 2011, Goldberg signed a three-year overall deal with Sony Pictures TV. During this time, Goldberg was a producer on NBC's Community while developing new projects. In 2012, Goldberg got a pilot commitment to shoot an autobiographical show about his family titled How the F--- Am I Normal?, and also reunited with Fox on a pilot starring AJ Michalka and Sean Giambrone. The autobiographical show was picked up by ABC with a title change to The Goldbergs and ran through ten seasons before ending in 2023. He also co-created Imaginary Mary and The Goldbergs' spinoff series Schooled for the network.

Goldberg also co-developed and produced The Muppets Mayhem, a Muppets spinoff series starring The Electric Mayhem, which streamed on Disney Plus in 2023.

=== Other projects ===
On July 22, 2020, Goldberg, along with Uncle Louie, launched challenge coins with the Garbage Pail Kids. They were licensed by Topps and sold out in minutes. On January 26, 2024, Goldberg was announced to be co-writing the Marvel Comics series Aliens: What If...? with Brian Volk-Weiss, Hans Rodionoff, and Leon and Paul Reiser, to be illustrated by Guiu Vilanova.
