= Simon Bloom =

Young adult novel series by Michael Reisman

- Simon Bloom, The Gravity Keeper (2007); The Octopus Effect (2009); The Order of Chaos (2012)
- Author: Michael Reisman
- Language: English
- Publisher: Dutton Books

Simon Bloom is a series of young adult novels by Michael Reisman. Set in the fictional town of Lawnville, New Jersey, it is about a boy who finds a book that lets him control the laws of physics. The first of the books was acquired by Walden Media.

== Books in the series ==
There are three novels in the series:

- Simon Bloom, The Gravity Keeper (2007, hardcover) ISBN 9780525479222, (2009, paperback) ISBN 9780142413685
- Simon Bloom: The Octopus Effect (2009, hardcover) ISBN 9780525420828
- Simon Bloom: The Order of Chaos (2012, e-published)

=== Simon Bloom, The Gravity Keeper ===
The first book in the series, Simon Bloom, The Gravity Keeper, was published February 1, 2008.

The novel introduces Simon, a boy with a very energetic, imaginative mind, is drawn into Dunkerhook Woods - a hidden, magical place that no one has ever noticed before. A mysterious book falls out of the sky and onto Simon's head. This book, the Teacher's Edition of Physics, lets him control the laws of physics. (There are other, similarly science-controlling books, all owned by members of the secret organization called the Knowledge Union.) Simon and his friends - shy and easily scared Owen, and popular Alysha - learn to control other formulas like gravity and friction. But there are villains with their own science powers who want to steal the book, as well as other members of the Knowledge Union who think Simon has stolen it.

=== Simon Bloom: The Octopus Effect ===
Simon Bloom: The Octopus Effect is the second book in the series. It is, once again, about Simon and his friends, Owen and Alysha. Just when Simon and his friends are getting about their normal life, Simon receives a warning from the Book of Physics. They soon learn that Sirabetta, the villain from the previous book, has escaped from jail and is now on the loose. They learn that they must now travel to the underwater the Order of Biology, where they search for Sirabetta and gain new biology-related powers. During this time, Simon gets a new formula, in which he is able to have many features of an octopus which helps them to defeat Sirabetta.

=== Simon Bloom: The Order of Chaos ===
Simon Bloom: The Order of Chaos is the third and final book in the series. According to Amazon and Barnes and Noble, it is only available as an eBook.

The following is located on the book's page:

"What's it about? What does that title mean? What will the cover look like? Will Simon have new sneakers in this picture, too?

All I'll tell you is that the story continues what's been happening in books 1 & 2, involves a visit to the Order of Chemistry, and has a guy named Simon Bloom in it.

Oh, and Of Course, The Narrator is back. Duh. (I mean, seriously...who else is going to tell the story? Michael Reisman?)"

It starts off as Simon and his friends learn they cannot trust everyone.
