= Uncle Louie =

American talent manager

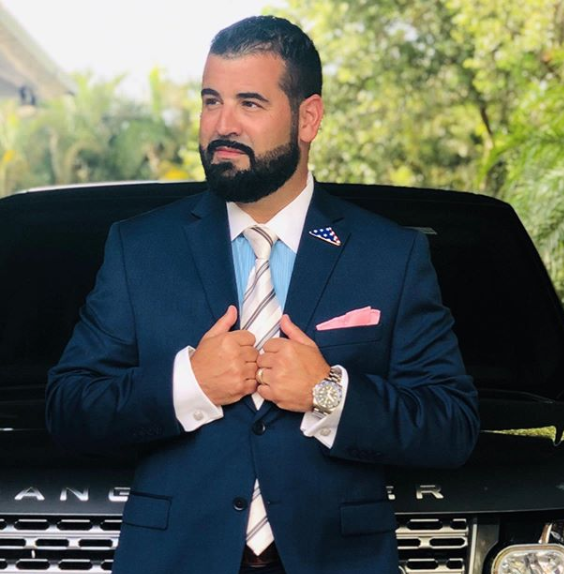
- Born: Louis Lafayette Gregory; July 27, 1978 (age 48); Queens, New York, U.S.
- Other name: Louis Gregory
- Occupations: Entrepreneur, music producer, actor, stuntman
- Website: www.Uncle-Louie.com

Louis Gregory (born July 1978), also known as Uncle Louie, is an American talent manager, music producer, and actor. He was the former president and co-founder of The Legends of Wrestling. He formerly worked for the United States Department of Homeland Security. Louis Gregory has appeared on the sitcom The Goldbergs.

== Early life ==
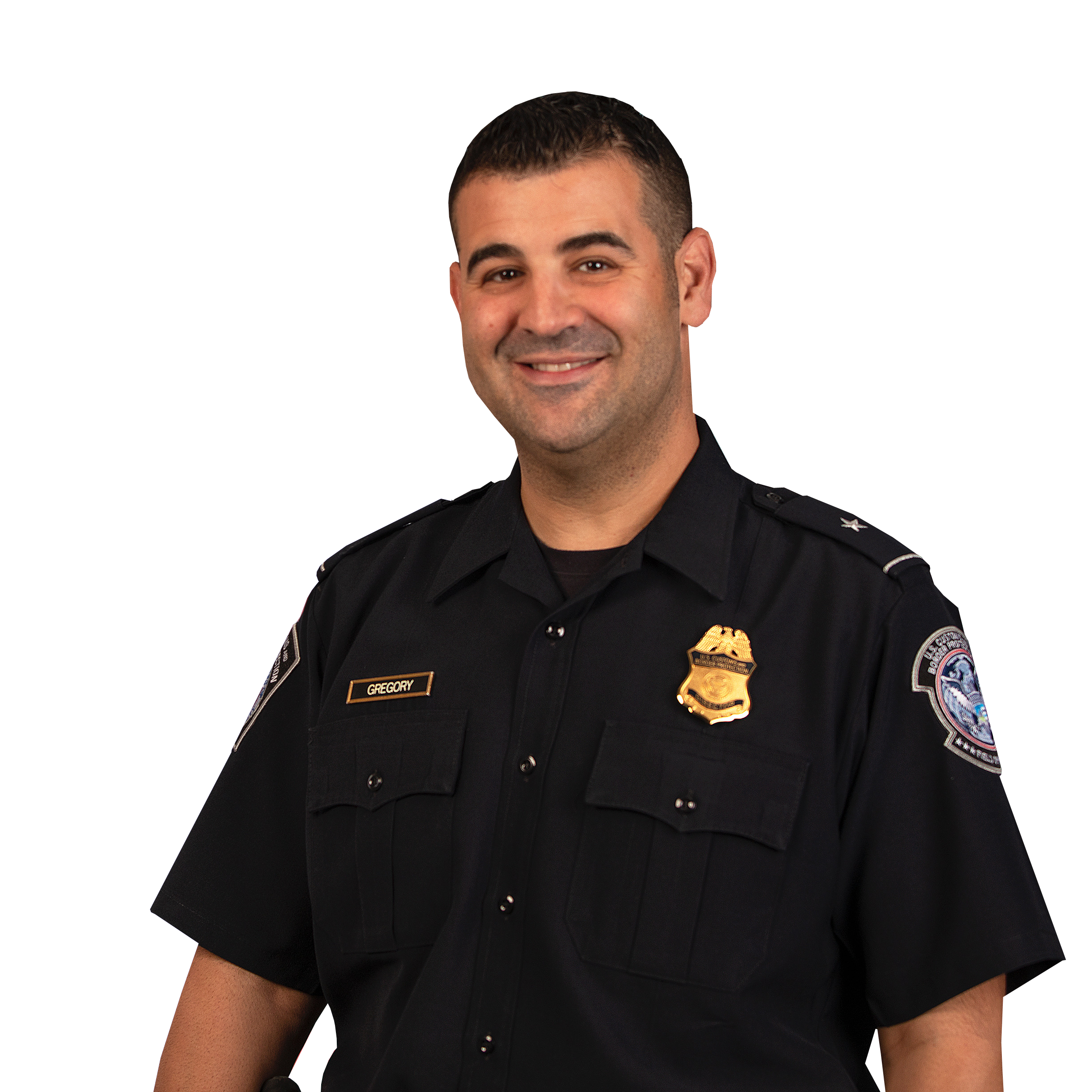
Uncle Louie in Department of Homeland Security uniform

He was born in New York City and was adopted by James and Penny Gregory. James Gregory was in the United States Army as an Army paratrooper and in the United States Air Force as an air force technical instructor. Penny was an automotive controller. Gregory attended Hillside Avenue High School in Queens and Sachem High School in Ronkonkoma, New York.

In 2016, Uncle Louie worked for the United States Department of Homeland Security as Director of U.S. Customs and Border Protection.

== Music producer ==
Uncle Louie has produced songs for Prince Markie Dee, Wyclef Jean, Nas, LL Cool J, Rev. Run, DMX, Eric B. of Eric B. & Rakim and Jennifer Lopez. Louis became a studio engineer in 1996 working under Prince Markie Dee. Prince Markie Dee and Eric B. of Eric B. and Rakim were his mentors, guiding him into the world of hip hop music production.

== Television appearances ==
In 2018, Uncle Louie co-starred on the television show The Goldbergs as Uncle Louie, the uncle of Valley Erica on the 18th episode during the 5th season. In 2019, Uncle Louie became a recurring role on The Goldbergs, co-starring again, in season 6, episode 15.

== Entertainment manager ==
In 2008, Uncle Louie began working in the professional wrestling world with Bill Goldberg. In 2008, Uncle Louie opened Uncle Louie Music Group and Uncle Louie Management, which offer promotional and collectible merchandise design and manufacturing under various companies as part of the Uncle Louie conglomerate. Some of Louis' first talent signings were Prince Markie Dee and Kool Rock-ski, of the Fat Boys. Recently, Louis worked with artist Eric B. to reunite him with his old partner Rakim of Eric B. & Rakim to celebrate the 30th anniversary of the album Paid in Full. He was the President of Legends of Wrestling, Uncle Louie promoted live wrestling events in the United States. In 2017, Uncle Louie client Bill Goldberg appeared on multiple episodes of ABC's The Goldbergs after Uncle Louie worked with the show's writer Adam F. Goldberg.

== Other ==
In 2026, he was appointed to the Homeland Security Advisory Council.
