= Breaking In (TV series) =

American sitcom television series

- Genre: Sitcom
- Created by: Adam F. Goldberg; Seth Gordon
- Starring: Bret Harrison; Alphonso McAuley; Christian Slater; Odette Annable; Megan Mullally; Erin Richards
- Theme music composer: Michael Wandmacher
- Opening theme: "We Got Your Back"
- Country of origin: United States
- Original language: English
- No. of seasons: 2
- No. of episodes: 20 (8 unaired in the U.S.)

Production
- Executive producers: Adam F. Goldberg; Adam Sandler; Doug Robinson; Jack Giarraputo; Seth Gordon; David Windsor
- Producer: Christian Slater
- Camera setup: Single-camera
- Running time: 30 minutes
- Production companies: Sony Pictures Television; Happy Madison Productions; Adam F. Goldberg Productions

Original release
- Network: Fox
- Release: April 6, 2011 – August 22, 2012

Breaking In (stylized as BREAKING_IN) is an American television sitcom created by Adam F. Goldberg and Seth Gordon that aired on Fox from April 6, 2011 to August 22, 2012. The series debuted as a mid-season replacement following American Idol.

Initially, Fox cancelled the series in May 2011; however, three months later TV Guide announced that Breaking In had been renewed for a second season.

== Premise ==
The series is focused on the eclectic staff of Contra Security, run by the eccentric and enigmatic Oz, as they test security systems by "breaking in before the bad guys". The story is largely told from the point of view of Cameron Price, the company's newest hire and a world-class hacker, as he adjusts to life with his new co-workers including Melanie, a beautiful thrill-seeking safecracker, and Cash, a fanboy and technological prodigy.

== Cast and characters ==
=== Main ===
- Bret Harrison as Cameron Price, a slacker-hacker who wanted to spend his life living comfortably in college as a big fish in a small pond after hacking their computers to give himself a full scholarship for life, but was drafted into Contra Security when they found out what he had done and threatened to expose him. He is 28 years old. His birthday is on April 6, 1984. He is skilled in disarming firewalls, password encryption and general troubleshooting.
- Alphonso McAuley as Cassius "Cash" Sparks, a 27-year-old fanboy genius and gadget guy who loves pranking and candy bars. He does office pranks, skilled in robotics and nano-technology, and is a master of sci-fi, comic book, and fanboy trivia. He also freestyles raps and lives in his mother's garage.
- Odette Annable as Melanie Garcia (season 1; guest, season 2), a thrill-seeking lockpicker and safecracker with whom Cameron is infatuated. Melanie was in a relationship with Dutch until he got arrested for selling clean urine to airline pilots for drug tests.
- Christian Slater as Ferris "Oz" Oswald Osbourne, a former thief and counterfeiter who now runs Contra Security and is trying to keep on the up-and-up, whose favorite thing to do is order around and manipulate his staff. He begins numerous episodes by saying "Greeting and salutations," a reference to Slater's role in the 1988 movie Heathers.
- Megan Mullally as Veronica "Ronnie" Judith Mann (season 2), The new Boss of Contra Security.
- Erin Richards as Molly Marie Hughes (season 2), the executive assistant of Veronica Mann. She becomes Cash's love interest.

=== Recurring ===
- Michael Rosenbaum as Dutch Nilbog, Melanie's boyfriend, has a jock-like personality and made a living selling clean urine on the internet to help people pass drug tests, which paid for his yellow Hummer, "Golden Thunder". Despite his personality and attitude, he is a very attentive boyfriend, which borders on smothering. Dutch later joins the team in episode three as their mechanic and wheel man. According to Cameron he got arrested for selling pee to airline pilots for drug tests.
- Trevor Moore as Josh Armstrong (season 1), a promiscuous psychoanalyst and master of disguise who can pretend to be anybody and manipulate people but can't stand Cameron. He was raised by a lesbian couple, both of whom are astronauts.
- Jennifer Irwin as "Creepy" Carol.
- Lance Krall as Ricky Borten (season 2).
- Terrell Lee as Buddy Revell (season 2).

== Development and production ==
In October 2009, Fox announced that it had given a script commitment to creator and writer Adam F. Goldberg for a new comedy. A pilot commitment followed in January 2010, and casting announcements began the following February. Bret Harrison was the first to be cast, with the series tentatively titled Titan Team. In March, Alphonso McAuley joined the pilot, now titled Security. Odette Annable was the third to join a few weeks later, and the cast was then completed with the additions of Christian Slater and Trevor Moore.

In June 2010, Fox ordered two more scripts for the series, under the new title Breaking In, with the series officially picked up in November with a 7-episode order. Michael Rosenbaum made a cameo appearance in the pilot episode, but producers were "so pleased with the performance" that he was later added to the main cast. Filming for the six remaining episodes began in Los Angeles in February 2011.

On May 10, 2011, Fox canceled Breaking In along with four other series that had been "on the bubble". However, two days later, Deadline Hollywood reported that the network was in potential talks with Sony Pictures Television to have Breaking In return for a second season, however the series was not included on Fox's 2011–12 schedule. The following month, Fox picked up the options on the cast until November 15, making another season possible.

In August 2011, news broke that Breaking In had been renewed for a second season to air as a midseason replacement in 2012. About the renewal, Fox's entertainment president, Kevin Reilly, said in a statement: "We are looking forward to bringing it back for a second season and continuing our relationship with this incredibly talented cast and these fantastic creators—Adam Goldberg and Seth Gordon. We can't wait to see where they take these characters next year." Afterward, it was confirmed that only Slater, Harrison and McCauley would return as regulars for the new season; Annable and Rosenbaum would only return for guest appearances. In addition, Megan Mullally and Erin Richards were to join the cast.

== Episodes ==
Season	Episodes	Originally released	
Season	Episodes	First released	Last released
1	7	April 6, 2011	May 17, 2011
2	13	March 6, 2012	August 22, 2012

=== Season 1 (2011) ===
No. overall	No. in season	Title	Directed by	Written by	Original release date	Prod. code	U.S. viewers (millions)
1	1	"Pilot"	Seth Gordon	Story by : Adam F. Goldberg & Seth Gordon; Teleplay by : Adam F. Goldberg	April 6, 2011	BIN-101	9.82
When Cameron, a talented computer hacker, gets caught hacking into a college's computer system to give himself full scholarship for life, he is drafted by Oz to work for him at Contra Security. There he meets Melanie Garcia, Cash and Josh Armstrong, who are then sent on an assignment to test the security at a car dealer by stealing a Lamborghini.
2	2	"Tis Better to Have Loved and Flossed"	Seth Gordon	Adam F. Goldberg	April 13, 2011	BIN-102	7.79
The team is assigned to break into an "old lady's house", but discover that the job is more complicated than it appears, and may have a connection to Oz. Meanwhile, Cameron decides to give up his crush on Melanie, and quickly meets a dentist named Amy (Alyssa Milano).
3	3	"Need For Speed"	Fred Savage	Chris Bishop	April 20, 2011	BIN-105	7.46
The team is hired to help NASCAR champion Jimmie Johnson and find out who has interfered with his headset used to communicate with the pit. Dutch is called in to help with the job.
4	4	"White on White on White"	Fred Savage	David Windsor & Casey Johnson	April 27, 2011	BIN-104	7.01
The gang is called to steal a painting that looks like a blank canvas. Things heat up when Melanie's dad shows up and learns that Oz was the person responsible for sending him to jail.
5	5	"Take the Movie and Run"	Matt Shakman	Adam F. Goldberg	May 4, 2011	BIN-103	7.07
The team is tasked with safekeeping the DVD screener of Goonies 2, and delivering it to the Comic-Con screening, amongst threat of its theft. Cash, a fan of the original film, retaliates when he is assigned to stay in the van.
6	6	"Breaking Out"	Phil Traill	Ben Wexler	May 11, 2011	BIN-106	6.95
After failing a mission due to infighting, Oz locks down the office, initiating a team-building exercise that challenges the team to work together in order to break out of the Contra security building.
7	7	"21.0 Jump Street"	Seth Gordon	Adam F. Goldberg	May 17, 2011	BIN-107	3.18
The team is called to secure the house of famous boxer Mike Tyson, while Cam is assigned to deal with a case of high school bullying. He quickly meets with his unknown high school sweetheart but thinks he finishes his job until the victim Leslie comes back after obviously being bullied. Oz then calls the team together, but the bully plans to retaliate by embarrassing Leslie at the prom so the crew with mixed feelings heads back to prom.

=== Season 2 (2012) ===
No. overall	No. in season	Title	Directed by	Written by	Original release date	Prod. code	U.S. viewers (millions)
8	1	"The Contra Club"	Seth Gordon	Adam F. Goldberg	March 6, 2012	BIN-201	3.60
The team is introduced to Contra's new sassy receptionist Veronica "Ronnie" Mann. Cam, Mel and Cash notice something weird is going on and they go out with "Creepy" Carol to find out what is happening. She informs them Oz is trying to sell the company to a corporate conglomerate named OCP, and Ronnie turns to be the VP of it. Cameron thinks Oz is selling the company only for the money, but Oz confesses that he is broke. OCP buys Contra Security, and Veronica, with the help of her prickly British assistant Molly, is their new boss. Note: Odette Annable, who plays Melanie, is no longer a main cast member; she is now credited as "Special Guest Star".
9	2	"Who's the Boss"	Seth Gordon	Chris Bishop	March 13, 2012	BIN-203	3.38
When Veronica doesn't approve of Contra's annual contract with a lingerie company to protect an extremely valuable diamond-encrusted bra, the team goes behind her back to pull it off. Although Melanie refuses to go with them because she is jealous of Molly as she thinks that Cam likes Molly and not her.
10	3	"The Blind Sided"	Troy Miller	Marc Abrams and Michael Benson	March 20, 2012	BIN-204	2.84
As the team searches for a computer hacker, Oz worries when Veronica allows a young teen to become the office's new intern claiming that he is a klepto. Meanwhile, Cam and Melanie have an awkward night on a stake-out trying to find the hacker, and after some fighting, they end up having sex, three times. Oz later tells Cam that she loves him, but she hates love and that she has left the company and Cam.
11	4	"Game of Jones"	Timothy Busfield	Mark Stegemann	March 27, 2012	BIN-205	2.70
A suspicious Molly questions the existence of Contra's top international sales rep. So Oz scrambles to prove that "Mr. Jones" is an actual person. Meanwhile, Veronica enlists Cameron to help her make friends in the office and Cash gets advice on women from Molly.
12	5	"Cyrano de Nerdgerac"	Alex Hardcastle	Matt Dearborn	April 3, 2012	BIN-206	2.55
After Veronica steals Oz's pudding, Oz wants to steal hers (Molly) but Molly starts to have feelings for Oz. So, Oz must rely on Cash and Cameron to teach him how to ward off women. By the end of the episode Cash starts to have feelings for Molly, which is explained by the way he looks at her.
13	6	"Double Dragon"	Eyal Gordin	Marc Abrams and Michael Benson	July 4, 2012 (in Portugal)	BIN-207	N/A
Oz's protégé-turned-nemesis, Henry Shaw, appears at Contra Security with a sword Oz gave him a long time ago. The sword is legendary in Oz's family, and Shaw won't give it away easily. Meanwhile, Cash is obsessed with his new sneakers from Back to the Future Part II and Cam decides to make a "nerd-a-vention". During it, Oz admits that he has a gambling problem. He lost Contra because of it. Veronica makes a bet with Shaw to see who can break into each other's company first. Cam almost wins but gets caught in a trap. Shaw bribes Cash with a DeLorean. It works until Cash finds out Cam is a hostage and sacrifices the car to save him. Contra wins and Oz recovers his sword. The episode ends with Cash selling some of his nerd stuff, but not all of it.
14	7	"The Legend of Hurley's Gold"	Roger Kumble	Amy Mass and Robin Shorr	July 11, 2012 (in Portugal)	BIN-208	N/A
Veronica asks Cam to pretend to be her boyfriend and make one of her ex-husbands jealous. Meanwhile, Oz, Cash and Molly work at the weekend to find a treasure that belongs to Hurley, a night cleaning guy that recently died. While Cash and Molly are working on the "mission", Molly confesses that she has feelings for Oz and Cash gets upset. Oz notices this and confesses to him that the whole thing is a plan to make Cash get closer with Molly. The mission ends up being a catastrophe. Oz gets mad and aggressive towards Cash and Molly, which leads to Molly looking at Oz in a completely different light.
15	8	"Chasing Amy and Molly"	Dean Holland	Hans Rodionoff and Lance Krall	July 18, 2012 (in Portugal)	BIN-209	N/A
The office plans a fake wedding for Molly so she can avoid deportation. She marries Cameron and, days later, an agent comes to Cam's house with some questions. Meanwhile, Oz discovers that he is still married to Amy and meets with her to discuss a divorce. They fight, they have sex and, later, they decide to still be married because they hate/love each other. Cash has a fight with Cameron over Molly and, after she sees them fighting, she decides to go home. Cameron and Cash decide to go after her and, when they reach her, Molly forgives them both.
16	9	"The Hungover"	Steve Pink	Tim Doyle	July 25, 2012 (in Portugal)	BIN-211	N/A
The Hanson Brothers ask Oz to look after the NHL cup while they go to Mexico. After a dispute with Oz, Veronica decides to do a girl's night and bring the cup with her. Meanwhile, things get awkward between Molly and Cam when they inadvertently see each other naked. At the girl's night, Cam spies on her afraid about what Molly might say about his penis. The girls get drunk, and Veronica wakes up in Carol's home. Oz calls her asking for the cup and Veronica realizes that she lost it. The hunt for the cup becomes a gender war, as both Oz and Cameron, and Molly and Veronica attempt to locate it.
17	10	"Heathers"	Rebecca Asher	Lacey Marisa Friedman and Aaron Kaczander	August 1, 2012 (in Portugal)	BIN-210	N/A
Oz is hired by Tony Hawk to protect all of his heritage. Meanwhile, Heather O'Brien is hired to make a publicity video for Contra Security's website. She's secretly making a bad video on purpose to humiliate Veronica at an OCP conference in which the film will be shown. The gang hacks into Heather's e-mail to erase the video, but Veronica stops them from doing so. At the OCP conference, everybody surprisingly likes the video, thinking it's not meant to be taken seriously, which leaves Heather very angry. Note: The episode contains many references to the movies Heathers and Gleaming the Cube.
18	11	"Cash of the Titans"	Robert Duncan McNeill	Chris Bishop and Adam F. Goldberg	August 8, 2012 (in Portugal)	BIN-202	N/A
Oz finally sells the company to OCP, and a dispute starts between him, Veronica and her sidekick Molly Hughes. Veronica wants to turn Contra into a "normal company" while Oz wants to keep things like they currently are. The conflict escalates until Oz seems to realize he has to abdicate of his selfish desires. At the end of the episode, Cameron wants to congratulate Oz on how well he has dealt with that issue, only to find out that Oz has a secret division on Contra where he has a replica of his old office. Note: This episode should be seen as the second episode of the season. In this episode, Melanie is still with Contra Security.
19	12	"The Nat'ral"	Tyler Spindel	Mark Stegemann and Chris Bishop	August 15, 2012 (in Portugal)	BIN-212	N/A
Melanie visits Cam and, four-and-a-half minutes later, they've already had sex. She seems to want to be back with him, until she finds out that Cameron and Molly are married. Melanie is heartbroken and blames Oz for the marriage. Henry Shaw appears at Contra and challenges them to a game of Slosh Ball. Contra seems confident, until Melanie joins the enemy. Contra loses, but Melanie hacks into Shaw's servers and destroys his company. She was working for Oz all along. Cameron and Melanie get back together as she rejoins Contra Security. At the end of the episode, Cash finally makes a move on Molly.
20	13	"Episode XIII"	Christian Slater	Adam F. Goldberg	August 22, 2012 (in Portugal)	BIN-213	N/A
Molly's uncle, Peter Mayhew, hires Contra Security after finding out that the Star Wars bounty hunter Bobby Fettman stole his original Chewbacca costume. If Oz finds it, he will receive enough money to buy the company back. While trying to break in Bobby's house, Oz is caught by Bobby's imperial guards. To save him, Cam fights Bobby in a saber duel and wins. At the end, Oz gets the company back and Cash says I love you to Molly. She smiles and says that she knows, implying that she feels something too.

== U.S. ratings ==
Season	Timeslot (ET)	# Ep.	Premiered		Ended		TV Season	Rank	Viewers (in millions)
Season	Timeslot (ET)	# Ep.	Date	Premiere Viewers (in millions)	Date	Finale Viewers (in millions)	TV Season	Rank	Viewers (in millions)
1	Wednesday 9:30 pm Tuesday 9:30 pm	7	April 6, 2011	9.82	May 17, 2011	3.18	2010–11	#54	8.24
2	Tuesday 9:30 pm	13	March 6, 2012	3.60	April 3, 2012	2.55	2011–12	#135	3.45

== Home media ==
On November 6, 2012, Amazon.com released both seasons on DVD. The 2-disc set is on DVD-R discs, burned on request. It contains no special features. The show is also available to stream on Amazon.com and iTunes Store.
