= The Goldbergs season 6 =

The Goldbergs
- Season 6
- DVD cover
- Starring: Wendi McLendon-Covey; Sean Giambrone; Troy Gentile; Hayley Orrantia; George Segal; Jeff Garlin; Sam Lerner
- No. of episodes: 23

Release
- Original network: ABC
- Original release: September 26, 2018 – May 8, 2019

Season chronology
- ← Previous; Season 5 Next → Season 7

The sixth season of the American television comedy series The Goldbergs premiered on ABC on September 26, 2018. The season is produced by Adam F. Goldberg Productions, Happy Madison Productions, Doug Robinson Productions, and Sony Pictures Television, and the executive producers are Adam F. Goldberg, Doug Robinson, and Seth Gordon. The season concluded on May 8, 2019, and consists of 23 episodes.

The show explores the daily lives of the Goldberg family, a family living in Jenkintown, Pennsylvania, in the 1980s. Beverly Goldberg (Wendi McLendon-Covey), the overprotective matriarch of the Goldbergs is married to Murray Goldberg (Jeff Garlin). They are the parents of three children, Erica (Hayley Orrantia), Barry (Troy Gentile), and Adam (Sean Giambrone).

ABC renewed The Goldbergs for its fifth and sixth seasons in May 2017.

On May 11, 2019, ABC renewed The Goldbergs for a seventh season.

On August 26, 2019, Goldberg stepped down as showrunner, replaced by executive producers Chris Bishop and Alex Barnow.

== Plot ==
Following the surprise announcement of Barry and Lainey getting engaged at his senior prom, the two waver on their decision as wedding planning goes on, with Lainey ultimately deciding to end the relationship and move to Los Angeles to pursue her music career. Adam is still with Jackie but notices she's different after spending the summer away (a reference to the new actress playing her). Beverly creates her own cookbook and becomes a self-proclaimed published author. Erica spends the year trying to figure out what she wants to do in life after dropping out of college, and after working at a karaoke bar and performing with her band The Dropouts a few times, she decides to join Barry at Penn in the fall. Barry, Geoff and the rest of JTP graduate high school, and while Barry determines he wants to become a doctor, Geoff decides not to join his father in the eye care business, opting for a different path in life instead.

== Cast ==
=== Main cast ===
- Wendi McLendon-Covey as Beverly Goldberg
- Sean Giambrone as Adam Goldberg
- Troy Gentile as Barry Goldberg
- Hayley Orrantia as Erica Goldberg
- Sam Lerner as Geoff Schwartz
- George Segal as Albert "Pops" Solomon
- AJ Michalka as Lainey Lewis (first eleven episodes)
- Jeff Garlin as Murray Goldberg

=== Recurring cast ===
- Alison Rich as Erica "Valley Erica" Coolidge

== Episodes ==
No. overall	No. in season	Title	Directed by	Written by	Original release date	Prod. code	U.S. viewers (millions)
118	1	"Sixteen Candles"	Lew Schneider	Alex Barnow	September 26, 2018	601	5.15
Preoccupied with Barry and Lainey's plans to wed and Erica having dropped out of college, Beverly and Murray forget Adam's 16th birthday. Barry and Lainey manipulate Beverly into letting them getting married by promising grandchildren, and Erica suggests they go to Atlantic City to discuss their engagement. While on a cruise ship, Beverly's constant smothering scare Lainey into ending the engagement, fearing this is not the future she is not looking for. When a despondent Barry laments to Bill and Murray, the latter convinces Lainey to go forward with their wedding plans with Barry, proclaiming he does not want them to break up. Meanwhile, when Adam learns his parents forgot his birthday, he asks Erica to throw a huge party a la Sixteen Candles. Erica, who learned earlier that she and her band have run up a massive electric bill, agrees, and secretly drives away her parents to deflect negative attention from herself. Adam's party soon gets out of control, causing him to try to give his party to Erica, believing it was his birthday gift. Erica and Adam soon learn about their misunderstandings, and a horrified Adam disowns Erica, saying he just really wants to be awesome like Erica was in high school. He eventually forgives Erica and they enjoy the last few hours of the party. Featured song: "If You Were Here" by The Thompson Twins
119	2	"You Got Zuko'd"	Jason Blount	David Guarascio	October 3, 2018	602	5.13
Adam's girlfriend Jackie returns from a summer at NYU with a completely new personality, and Adam must work to save the relationship when he misinterprets the advice given by his loved ones he gets a new personality and look to impress Jackie like Sandy Olson tries impress Danny Zuko in "Grease." Meanwhile, Beverly is not impressed with Lainey's domestic skills, insisting that Lainey learn to cook for Barry like she does. Featured song: "White Wedding" by Billy Idol Interview: The real Jackie Geary, by Sean Giambrone Notes: The date at the beginning of the episode is announced as "September" instead of the expected "October 3rd".; This is the first appearance of Alexis G. Zall as Jackie Geary, who was previously played by Rowan Blanchard.; First of two season co-star appearances of Ben Zelevansky as Dale.
120	3	"RAD!"	Lew Schneider	Dan Levy	October 10, 2018	603	5.05
Erica gets a job working at the new karaoke bar in town, and quickly forbids her mother from coming in and singing. But when the owner (Rick Springfield) tells Erica it is a good thing to bring in extra customers, she bites the bullet and invites Bev and her friends. Erica reluctantly allows Beverly and her friends to sing songs together, and after Erica scolds Beverly for embarrassing her, the latter tells Erica that she is always seeing the worst of her and leaves. She and Beverly eventually make up and sing "Jessie's Girl" together. Meanwhile, Pops give Barry and Lainey $500, telling them to only use the money wisely, but both Barry and Lainey instantly waste the money on a "rad" BMX bike and a keytar. Murray then attempts to teach Barry how to save money, and he listens to him, thus acting the same way as Murray. However, he only saves $6. Barry and Lainey then try to make a lot of money from the stuff they bought, but Murray tells them they both stink at the stuff they bought. Murray eventually has a change of heart and convinces the two to not sell their stuff and opens a savings account and puts the $6 Barry saved in there. Featured songs:: "Jessie's Girl" by Rick Springfield, "La Bamba" by Ritchie Valens (covered by Hayley Orrantia and Sam Lerner)
121	4	"Hersheypark"	Jay Chandrasekhar	Daisy Gardner	October 17, 2018	604	4.90
Adam's excitement over the school field trip to Hersheypark is tempered when Beverly insists on being a chaperone. He learns from Jackie, Dave Kim, Chad Kremp and Emmy Mirsky that they all forbade their parents from chaperoning events a year or more ago. Adam rebels by telling his mom the trip is cancelled, but when Beverly learns the truth, she writes Adam one of her infamous "guilt letters". Adam relents, only to find out that Beverly also taught his friends' parents how to write the perfect guilt letter. Thus, all the parents chaperone the trip. Elsewhere, Geoff and Barry attend career day and each has a different take. Not wanting to follow his father's footsteps as an eye doctor, Geoff instead interns at Murray's furniture store, while Barry shows good skills with patients when he assists Lou Schwartz at his eye care practice. Featured song: "She Drives Me Crazy" by Fine Young Cannibals Absent: George Segal as Pops Interview: The real Beverly Goldberg, by Wendi McLendon-Covey Note: This is the first appearance of Suzy Nakamura as Mrs. Kim since season 2, and this would also be her final appearance on the show.
122	5	"Mister Knifey-Hands"	Lew Schneider	Andrew Secunda	October 24, 2018	605	4.97
Adam insists he is old enough to watch A Nightmare on Elm Street with Jackie and her parents, but he ends up being unable to sleep without fear. Beverly thinks her smothering will ease her son's nightmares, but Adam is ultimately able to sleep again after Mr. Geary shows him a movie industry magazine with a feature on how the Freddy Krueger makeup is applied to docile-looking actor Robert Englund. Nevertheless, Beverly confronts Jackie's parents for corrupting her schmoo, dragging along Murray who is already convinced that the parents are "hippies". Meanwhile, Erica refuses to wear Geoff's "lame" couples costume to the high school's Halloween party. But after Mr. Glascott convinces her to talk to his class about life after high school, Erica starts to relive her glory days as a popular student. She starts showing up at school every day, prompting Geoff to call her a "13th grader" when she won't leave. Featured song: "You Make My Dreams" by Hall & Oates Absent: Troy Gentile as Barry Note: The date at the beginning of the episode is announced as "October 23rd" instead of the expected "October 24th".
123	6	"Fiddler"	Jason Blount	Chris Bishop	October 31, 2018	606	4.79
Murray takes on a sort of "sports dad" role with Adam, encouraging his son to tackle the lead role in the school's production of Fiddler on the Roof. But Adam hates the play and auditions for a small role instead. He finally appeases his dad by agreeing to be the understudy for the lead. Meanwhile, Erica learns that Geoff did really well on his SAT test and wants to attend UCLA. Erica sees an opportunity to join Geoff in Southern Cal and write commercial jingles. Not wanting her daughter to leave, Beverly convinces Erica to develop an audition tape of jingles for silly products that don't exist. Erica eventually recognizes the sabotage, as her mother did a similar thing prior to Erica's SAT test. Featured song: "The Living Years" by Mike and the Mechanics Note: The date at the beginning of the episode is announced as "November 1st" instead of the expected "October 31st".
124	7	"Bohemian Rap City"	Jay Chandrasekhar	Chris Bishop	November 7, 2018	607	5.12
Adam's obsession with toys is cause for concern for Beverly and Murray, and they try to distract him with a new hobby. Meanwhile, the Dropouts' decide to audition for Star Search, but their egos threaten the band's future. Featured song: "Bohemian Rhapsody" by Queen
125	8	"The Living Room: A 100% True Story"	Lew Schneider	Lauren Bans	November 28, 2018	609	4.94
Barry realizes that as a future doctor, he should be more concerned about Murray's health, so he enlists the Jenkintown Posse and Coach Mellor to help get his father in shape. Meanwhile, Beverly is horrified to learn that Erica and Adam don't want any of the priceless heirlooms in her fancy, never-really-used living room. Featured song:: "Time for Me to Fly" by REO Speedwagon Absent: George Segal as Pops
126	9	"Bachelor Party"	Christine Lakin	Mike Sikowitz	December 5, 2018	610	4.88
Barry names Adam as his best man and tasks him with throwing the most epic bachelor party ever. Adam tries to throw Barry the wild party he wants, even enlisting help from Uncle Marvin, but Barry soon realizes he would rather have a low-key time with his friends and Adam. Meanwhile, Beverly buys a new car for Murray who initially detests that she'd splurge for him until he accepts it only for the car to break down for good. Featured song: "Just What I Needed" by The Cars Absent: George Segal as Pops Note: This is the final appearance of Ben Zelevansky as Dale.
127	10	"Yippee Ki Yay Melon Farmer"	Richie Keen	Aaron Kaczander	December 12, 2018	608	5.29
Adam becomes enamored with the movie Die Hard and longs to make his own take on the film. When Marvin shows up and brags about his new role on TV, he teams up with Adam to make a low-budget version of the film. Murray tries to be supportive of them until he learns that Marvin's new TV role is on an episode of Cops. Meanwhile, Barry is excited to finally have an excuse to celebrate Christmas but is disappointed to learn that Bill and Lainey don't celebrate the holiday since Lainey's mom left. Barry decides to tell Beverly that the Lewis' Christmas is incredible so she'll give him an even more intense Hannukah. Featured song: "Christmas Wrapping" by The Waitresses Note: The date at the beginning of the episode is announced as "December" instead of the expected "December 12th".
128	11	"The Wedding Singer"	Lew Schneider	Rachel Sweet	January 9, 2019	611	5.18
As Barry and Lainey's wedding approaches, Barry and Lainey start to realize that they're not ready and they struggle to tell their family. Unfortunately for them, Beverly is going all out to give them a dream wedding, even attempting to hire wedding singer Robbie Hart to play the event. Meanwhile, Adam tries to get hired as the videographer for the wedding but is shot down because his videos are too wacky. Geoff attempts to help and Adam reveals that he struggles dealing with real emotions, hiding behind humor. Eventually, Lainey decides she can't go through with the wedding and decides to fly to Los Angeles to pursue her music career. Barry follows her, intent on going with her. However, when Robbie Hart sings a song to Julia on the plane, it helps Barry and Lainey realize they aren't ready to get married but they promise to come back together when they are. Adam makes a tribute video to Barry and Lainey's relationship to cheer Barry up and adult Adam hints that while Barry and Lainey did not get married in the 80s, they reconnected later in Featured song: "Grow Old With You" by Adam Sandler (as Robbie Hart) Guest starring: Jon Lovitz, reprising his role as Jimmie Moore from The Wedding Singer. Adam Sandler, Drew Barrymore and Billy Idol also appear via archive footage.
129	12	"The Pina Colada Episode"	Lea Thompson	Erik Weiner	January 16, 2019	612	4.80
After Lainey moved to Los Angeles, Barry becomes heartbroken that his first love is gone, Erica is also sad because her band mate is going to go solo and Bill suffers from empty nest syndrome. Murray tries to heal them from their sadness by buying a car stereo. Beverly and Geoff tag along but their antics breaks the stereo and it continuously plays "Escape". When they get stuck in traffic, Bill leaves them and Murray tells Barry, Erica and Beverly that he missed Lainey as well. After Murray calms down over dinner (with Erica, Beverly and Barry quietly singing "Escape"), he realizes that he doesn’t have to be the strong one. Then Murray, Erica, Barry and Beverly watch Charles Barkley play on the Philadelphia 76ers with Bill and Geoff joining them. Meanwhile, Coach Mellor announces he is leaving William Penn. So a different gym teacher would replace him. Adam becomes excited because he thinks that he will not run the mile. The first gym teacher kept blocking shots when the class did some basketball drills so he was replaced with Coach Mellor's brother Nick. Adam thinks that he can cheat at running the mile just like Rosie Ruiz who won the Boston Marathon by taking the subway. He enlists Pops to help him but Rick finds out about the scheme. In the end, Adam finally runs the mile and says goodbye to Coach Mellor. Featured song: "Escape (The Piña Colada Song)" by Rupert Holmes Guest starring: Bill Goldberg as Coach Nick Mellor, Charles Barkley as Neilo Green
130	13	"I Coulda Been a Lawyer"	Jay Chandrasekhar	Steve Basilone	January 23, 2019	614	5.53
After Beverly gets hit by a car in an intersection on her way to running errands, she heads to the city council to demand that a stop sign be put in that intersection. So Adam makes a video with Pops to try to persuade the council to install a stop sign. Meanwhile, Barry finally recovers from Lainey leaving only to find he hasn't prepared his college essay and enlists Murray to help him. After learning about the stop sign, Erica tries to motivate Beverly to actually follow through on becoming a lawyer only for her to immediately back out, leading to Erica breaking down that Lainey abandoning their band affected her to the point of self doubt of her future which is turning out just like her mother's. In the end, Bev decides to write a cookbook and encourages Erica to not quit on her dream, Murray realizes Barry has grown up more than he thought and a new stop sign is placed in the intersection which means no more car crashes for Beverly the next time she runs errands (despite the moot point of the Goldbergs never stopping at the intersection anyway). Featured song: "I Wanna Dance with Somebody (Who Loves Me)" by Hayley Orrantia Note: The date at the beginning of the episode is announced as "March 6th" instead of the expected "January 23rd".
131	14	"Major League'd"	Lea Thompson	Alex Barnow	January 30, 2019	615	5.64
Based on the movie Major League. Principal Ball wants to get rid of the baseball program at William Penn Charter School. So he enlists Mr. Crosby to recruit students for the team. Barry and Adam get recruited along with Dave Kim and the JTP. Barry gets glasses to improve his pitching but he gets teased by the JTP's rival. They practice harder and faced them in a game. Adam gets hit by a pitch. And just like Charlie Sheen's character in the movie, Barry Goldberg pitched against William Penn's crosstown rival. But he aimed his pitches at the ballplayers causing him to be thrown out of the game. Meanwhile, Erica and Geoff escape on a romantic date, but Murray's car ends up tumbling off a cliff. However, Geoff's father wants to end their relationship because of his son's honesty. Featured song: "Wild Thing" by X Absent: George Segal as Pops Note: First of two season co-star appearances of Sam Kindseth as David Sirota.
132	15	"My Valentine Boy"	Lew Schneider	Matt Mira	February 13, 2019	613	4.77
As Barry mopes over Lainey's departure, Erica and the JTP try to boost his confidence. Barry incites Geoff to be rude to Erica's newest member, a sexy guy named Evan, fearing that Evan could crush Geoff's relation with Erica. Meanwhile, Adam and Jackie both want to celebrate their Valentine's Day alone, but Adam has to get rid of Beverly and tries to force Murray into spending the evening with her. Featured song: "Confetti" by The Lemonheads Guest Starring: Evan Dando as Joey Wawa, Luke Eisner as Evan
133	16	"There Can Be Only One Highlander Club"	Lew Schneider	Donielle Muransky & Alison Rich	February 20, 2019	617	4.98
Beverly tries to create a friendship between Johnny Atkins and Adam. When Johnny sees that Adam has a passion for Highlander, he suggests they could create their own club, but Adam decides to betray him, leading into a war. They reconcile at the end, though Atkins's girlfriend Carla leaves him for Dave Kim. Meanwhile, Murray reconnects with an old friend while battling for a parking spot. It turns out that they hadn't keep in touch after high school. Barry tries to avoid the same fate with the JTP, but in the end, he manages to find Murray's old friends and reconnects them with each other. Featured songs: "Princes of the Universe" by Queen, "Somebody" by Bryan Adams Note: This is the final appearance of Sam Kindseth as David Sirota.
134	17	"Our Perfect Strangers"	Kevin Smith	Mike Sikowitz	February 27, 2019	616	4.23
When Pops announces that his cousin Gelb is coming for a visit, Erica, Barry and Adam are not thrilled to see him until they realize that they can use him as a Balki (from the sitcom Perfect Strangers) to make him buy things they can't. Though they enjoy it, they are devastated when he reveals the truth and finally decide to make his life better. Also, Beverly plans to make a cookbook but an argument ensues with her friends and they turn on her. She later regains their friendship when Murray visits them. Featured song: "Nothing's Gonna Stop Me Now" by David Pomeranz
135	18	"The Beverly Goldberg Cookbook"	Fred Savage	Hans Rodionoff	March 13, 2019	618	4.75
Beverly always cooks food for her family. Inspired by Julia Child, she mails manuscripts of her cookbook to publishers, only to be rejected because they think that her cooking is "awful." So Adam decides to help Beverly film a public access television show in the kitchen just like The French Chef so Beverly could promote her book. But she panics on camera and talks like Julia Child, causing Adam to tell her how much she embarrasses him every time. They try again filming in an actual TV studio, but Adam freezes on camera later passing out. Meanwhile, Murray helps Barry when he ruins his college recommendations letter. Featured song: "Keep On Loving You" by REO Speedwagon
136	19	"Eight-bit Goldbergs"	Jay Chandrasekhar	Lauren Bans	March 20, 2019	619	4.53
Inspired after playing the computer game Leisure Suit Larry, Adam creates his own 8-bit game for a class with the characters based on his family, but faces criticism from Barry and Erica for using their likenesses without consent. Adam changes Erica's character to Eric, but when the game becomes popular amongst their classmates, Erica and Barry are further incensed about the portrayal of their characters and demand Adam to remove them from the game altogether. Murray, knowing about the game and the nature of his likeness being used on it is supportive of Adam and encourages him not to give into what Erica and Barry say. Beverly and Bill try to intervene when Pops' gambling addiction rages out of control following a trip to Atlantic City. Featured song: "Hold Me Now" by The Thompson Twins Interview: The real Eric Goldberg, by Hayley Orrantia
137	20	"This is This is Spinal Tap"	Ryan Krayser	Rachel Sweet & Adam Olsen	April 3, 2019	620	4.39
Adam makes his first rockumentary when Erica finds out that The Dropouts have been asked to perform at The Spectrum for the Flyers Wives Carnival. Barry and Erica get into a debate about whether or not he should be a member of the group. Beverly is concerned about Murray and urges him to see a doctor in regards to his health and begins to get paranoid when it is revealed he has a mole on his back, fearing it could be cancerous. Murray doesn't like the fact that Beverly has told her friends and Bill about his diagnosis and becomes irate when he finds out he missed out on the opportunity to watch Mike Schmidt's final game at Veterans Stadium live. Featured song: "Walk This Way" by Run-DMC and Aerosmith
138	21	"I Lost on Jeopardy"	Lew Schneider	Chris Bishop & Alex Barnow	April 10, 2019	622	4.63
Erica sets out to apply to be a contestant on Jeopardy! in an attempt to build up her confidence. The plan however goes awry when she tells Beverly and Murray, who think she should be focusing on returning to college instead of applying to be a contestant on game shows. After being denied, Erica slowly comes to terms of the reality of her situation. Before the school's color day, Barry finds out that Kim has a crush on him, but feels conflicted as he realizes he isn't over Lainey yet and does his best to sabotage any attempt at knowing her intentions, going as far as asking Adam to give her an insulting letter. Barry later swallows his pride and opts to help an injured Kim out and decides to get to know her as friends. Featured songs: "The Touch" by Stan Bush, "Solsbury Hill" by Peter Gabriel
139	22	"Mom Trumps Willow"	Vern Davidson	Andrew Secunda	May 1, 2019	621	4.50
It's Mother's Day, and after Barry and Erica manage to get out of spending time with Beverly, she looks forward to spending the whole day with Adam, who has already made plans with Dave Kim to see the new movie Willow. He agrees to do a photo shoot with Beverly before the movie, but when she starts putting their picture on cups and towels, and then forbids Adam to see the movie, he tells Beverly "I hate you," after which she becomes hurt and lets Adam see the movie. Some time later, she tells Adam she's "done" with their relationship, telling him she can only forgive him if he can go back in time to being a sweet little boy. Taking this to heart, Adam recreates the most embarrassing photo of his life, but Beverly rejects his apology. Frustrated, Adam goes into a rant saying that he both hates and loves her, telling her that while she may be done being his mom, he will never be done being his son. Happy that Adam said that to prove how much he loves her, Beverly forgives him. Meanwhile, "middle child" Barry is accepted to multiple colleges, including Penn. However, Erica is also accepted to Penn, and the two subsequently battle it out for the right to go to Penn. Tired of Barry's childish "middle child" act and realizing the fact he got into multiple colleges, Murray gives Erica the green light to attend Penn. At orientation, the two get into a fight and Erica reveals she wanted Barry to go to college with her because she is scared of the thought of not having him by her side in college. In the end, the two agree to attend college together. Featured song: "If This Is It" by Huey Lewis and the News
140	23	"Breakin'"	Jason Blount	Adam F. Goldberg & Susan Cinoman	May 8, 2019	623	4.65
As the JTP gets ready to graduate from high school, Barry struggles to say goodbye to Adam and resorts to picking on him, leading Adam to unintentionally let slip that Barry never even completed his community service requirement. Meanwhile, after Geoff wins valedictorian, his overwhelming stress about his summer plans causes him to get a case of the shingles, resulting in Erica making plans for her and Geoff to join the JTP's plans to follow The Grateful Dead all summer. Featured song: "Road to Nowhere" by Talking Heads

== Ratings ==
Viewership and ratings per episode of The Goldbergs season 6
No.	Title	Air date	Rating/share (18–49)	Viewers (millions)	DVR (18–49)	DVR viewers (millions)	Total (18–49)	Total viewers (millions)
1	"Sixteen Candles"	September 26, 2018	1.4/7	5.15	0.6	—N/a	2.0	—N/a
2	"You Got Zuko'd"	October 3, 2018	1.3/6	5.13	—N/a	—N/a	—N/a	—N/a
3	"RAD!"	October 10, 2018	1.3/6	5.05	0.6	1.50	1.9	6.55
4	"Hershey Park"	October 17, 2018	1.1/5	4.90	0.6	1.42	1.7	6.32
5	"Mr. Knifey-Hands"	October 24, 2018	1.3/6	4.97	0.6	1.46	1.9	6.44
6	"Fiddler"	October 31, 2018	1.0/5	4.79	0.6	1.50	1.6	6.29
7	"Bohemian Rap City"	November 7, 2018	1.3/6	5.12	0.7	1.58	2.0	6.70
8	"The Living Room: A 100% True Story"	November 28, 2018	1.2/5	4.94	0.6	1.62	1.8	6.56
9	"Bachelor Party"	December 5, 2018	1.2/5	4.88	0.5	1.58	1.7	6.46
10	"Yippie Ki Yay Melon Farmer"	December 12, 2018	1.1/5	5.29	0.6	1.50	1.7	6.79
11	"The Wedding Singer"	January 9, 2019	1.3/6	5.18	0.6	1.57	1.9	6.75
12	"The Pina Colada Episode"	January 16, 2019	1.2/6	4.80	0.6	1.54	1.8	6.34
13	"I Coulda Been a Lawyer"	January 23, 2019	1.2/6	5.53	0.6	1.41	1.8	6.75
14	"Major League'd"	January 30, 2019	1.3/6	5.64	0.5	1.40	1.8	7.04
15	"My Valentine Boy"	February 13, 2019	1.1/5	4.77	0.6	1.65	1.7	6.42
16	"There Can Be Only One Highlander Club"	February 20, 2019	1.1/5	4.98	0.5	—N/a	1.6	—N/a
17	"Our Perfect Strangers"	February 27, 2019	1.1/5	4.23	0.6	1.60	1.7	6.12
18	"The Beverly Goldberg Cookbook"	March 13, 2019	1.1/5	4.75	0.5	1.36	1.6	6.12
19	"Eight-bit Goldbergs"	March 20, 2019	1.2/6	4.53	0.5	1.48	1.7	6.01
20	"This is This is Spinal Tap"	April 3, 2019	1.1/5	4.39	0.5	—N/a	1.6	—N/a
21	"I Lost on Jeopardy"	April 10, 2019	1.1/5	4.63	0.5	1.41	1.6	6.04
22	"Mom Trumps Willow"	May 1, 2019	1.0/5	4.50	0.5	1.33	1.5	5.83
23	"Breakin’"	May 8, 2019	1.1/6	4.65	0.4	1.23	1.5	5.86
