= The Goldbergs season 7 =

Season of television series

The Goldbergs
- Season 7
- Promotional poster
- Starring: Wendi McLendon-Covey; Sean Giambrone; Troy Gentile; Hayley Orrantia; George Segal; Jeff Garlin; Sam Lerner
- No. of episodes: 23

Release
- Original network: ABC
- Original release: September 25, 2019 – May 13, 2020

Season chronology
- ← Previous; Season 6 Next → Season 8

The seventh season of the American television comedy series The Goldbergs premiered on ABC on September 25, 2019, with new showrunners Chris Bishop and Alex Barnow after Adam F. Goldberg stepped down. The season concluded on May 13, 2020 and consists of 23 episodes.

Production on the 24th episode was halted as a result of the COVID-19 pandemic, resulting in only 23 episodes being completed and aired. The planned 24th episode, which focuses on the wedding of Bill Lewis and his girlfriend, ended up being produced during season 8.

== Plot ==
Barry and Erica are at college together and sharing a dormitory, and after attempting to run a food delivery service, Geoff moves into Erica's dorm (even though he isn't a student) and their relationship grows stronger, while Barry moves out and rejoins JTP at off-campus housing. Erica makes friends with a classmate named Lauren ("Ren" for short), who eventually becomes involved with Barry. Adam's former girlfriend Dana Caldwell moves back to Jenkintown and just wants to be friends with him as he starts to develop a relationship with popular new girl Brea Bee instead. Adam also questions if becoming a filmmaker is truly the right career path for him but he still applies to New York University. Murray agrees to a merger with former rival Formica Mike, bringing their two furniture businesses together.

== Cast ==
=== Main cast ===
- Wendi McLendon-Covey as Beverly Goldberg
- Sean Giambrone as Adam Goldberg
- Troy Gentile as Barry Goldberg
- Hayley Orrantia as Erica Goldberg
- Sam Lerner as Geoff Schwartz
- George Segal as Albert "Pops" Solomon
- Jeff Garlin as Murray Goldberg

=== Recurring cast ===
- Ken Lerner as Lou Schwartz
- Mindy Sterling as Linda Schwartz
- Stephen Tobolowsky as Principal Ball
- Dan Bakkedahl as Mr. Woodburn
- Steve Guttenberg as Dr. Katman
- Cedric Yarbrough as Vic
- Jennifer Irwin as Virginia Kremp
- Stephanie Courtney as Essie Karp
- Kelli Berglund as Ren
- Natalie Alyn Lind as Dana Caldwell
- Sadie Stanley as Brea Bee
- Kenny Ridwan as Dave Kim
- Stephanie Katherine Grant as Emmy Mirsky
- Sean Marquette as Johnny Atkins
- Alex Jennings as Carla Mann
- David Koechner as Bill Lewis
- Jessica St. Clair as Dolores
- Jacob Hopkins as Chad Kremp
- Matt Bush as Andy Cogan
- Noah Munck as "Naked Rob" Smith
- Shayne Topp as Matt Bradley
- Zayne Emory as J.C. Spink
- Theodore Barnes as Brian Walls
- Augie Isaac as Matthew Schernecke

== Episodes ==
No. overall	No. in season	Title	Directed by	Written by	Original release date	Prod. code	U.S. viewers (millions)
141	1	"Vacation"	Lew Schneider	Alex Barnow & Chris Bishop	September 25, 2019	701	4.44
"The Goldbergs are going on vacation!" With these words, Beverly forces the entire family to take one last vacation before Erica and Barry leave for college. Just like the Griswolds in National Lampoon's Vacation, Beverly insists they drive to Disneyland rather than fly. After causing chaos at a wild west themed attraction, Pops ditches them and drives off with a woman (Christie Brinkley reprising her role as the flirty woman from the movie), and Erica tells Adam and Barry that they're not moving out but are moving on to the next chapter of their lives, not knowing that Beverly overheard them. Meanwhile, Erica worries about "something important" Geoff wants to tell her when they return, thinking he wants to break up. After their car breaks down, Adam tells Barry and Erica he will be glad that they're not in the house anymore, causing Beverly to demand that they tell her the truth about going to college and never looking back. She decides they should all just go home. But just then, Geoff picks them up and tells Erica that he just wanted to inform her he's taking a gap year rather than attending college right away. They arrive at Disneyland with Pops joining them after he arrived. After being told by the security guard that the park is closed but that it opens in 15 minutes, Beverly lies about their adventure, and the Goldbergs get into the park before the actual opening and finally enjoy their last family vacation. Featured Songs: "Holiday Road" by Lindsey Buckingham, "Chariots of Fire" by Vangelis Guest Starring: Christie Brinkley as Aleah Welsh, Anthony Michael Hall as Rusty the Security Guard, Dana Barron as Security Guard #2, Erik Weiner as Sheriff Notes: The date at the beginning of the episode is announced as "The last week of summer" instead of "September 25th".; The episode is dedicated to "the happiest place on Earth".; Anthony Michael Hall and Dana Barron, who played the amusement park security guards, were the actors that played the Griswold children Rusty and Audrey in 1983's National Lampoon's Vacation, which also featured Christie Brinkley's Aleah Welsh character.; Anthony Michael Hall joined the cast in a guest starring role later this season as school guidance counselor Joe Perott, making 1-3 appearances in seasons 7 through 10.; The second of three acting appearances by series writer/producer Erik Weiner. He also made guest star appearances in seasons 5 and 9.
142	2	"Dana's Back"	Jay Chandrasekhar	Teleplay by : Mike Sikowitz; Story by : Adam F. Goldberg & Mike Sikowitz	October 2, 2019	702	4.27
Adam gets a huge surprise: Dana has moved back to Jenkintown and returns to William Penn! She approaches him and says she's glad to have a friend to rely on as she adjusts to the changes since being away, but Adam worries about more popular guys moving in on her and makes it clear he wants to be boyfriend-girlfriend again. Dana is disappointed, telling Adam she really needed his unconditional friendship as she readjusts to life in Jenkintown. Meanwhile, Barry and Erica's college move-in day goes awry when they discover they have nowhere to live on campus. They accuse Beverly of purposely not mailing in their housing checks, but to their shock, learn that it was Murray. After acting aloof, Murray finally admits that he will miss them greatly. Featured Song: "The Flame" by Cheap Trick Guest Starring: Stephen Guarino as Administrator Dean, Ricardo Hurtado as Brian McMahon, Nick Alvarez as Larry, Matthew Gold as Gary Notes: The date at the beginning of the episode is announced as "The first day of school" instead of "October 2nd".; The episode is dedicated to "leaving for college".; This is the first appearance of Dana Caldwell since the finale of season 4.
143	3	"Food in a Geoffy"	Lew Schneider	Story by : Adam F. Goldberg; Teleplay by : Matt Roller	October 9, 2019	703	4.49
Inspired by Murray, Geoff begins a food delivery service he calls Food in a Geoffy, but dealing with his "CEO" (Barry) and employees (the rest of the JTP) has Geoff regretting his decision. Meanwhile, Adam, now the only child at home, becomes overwhelmed with attention from Beverly. After Mr. Woodburn refuses to allow Adam to submit a video in place of a written report on Sandra Day O'Connor, Adam tries to use Mom's constant lingering to his advantage, but it ends up backfiring. Featured Song: "Save It for Later" by The English Beat Guest Starring: George Wendt, John Ratzenberger, Rhea Perlman and Kirstie Alley
144	4	"Animal House"	Jay Chandrasekhar	Bill Callahan	October 16, 2019	704	4.10
Determined to live the Animal House life in a college fraternity, Barry sets his sights on the polo-and-boat-shoes wearing Beta Zeta house. His first attempt to impress the recruiters as Bluto and Flounder from the movie fails, so he then attempts to be himself (as Big Tasty) and perform in the Beta Zeta talent show, with help from Adam and Dave Kim. After this too fails to earn him a pledge, Erica helps her brother see he already has a great fraternity in the JTP. Meanwhile, with two kids gone at home, Bev tries to get Murray out of his chair and participating in some activities with her. When he won't budge, she decides to make him jealous by arranging events with Murray's friends, Bill Lewis and Vic. Featured Songs: "Shout" by Otis Day and the Knights, "You Might Think" by The Cars
145	5	"Parents Thursday"	Melissa Joan Hart	Teleplay by : Aaron Kaczander; Story by : Adam F. Goldberg & Aaron Kaczander	October 23, 2019	705	3.91
As Erica courts a new college friend named Ren (short for Lauren), she remembers that parents weekend is coming up and doesn't want Ren to see Beverly's embarrassing smothering. She and Barry concoct a plan to tell Beverly that the college is instead holding a "parents Thursday". Beverly sees through the ruse, and Barry insists it was all Erica's idea, resulting in getting Beverly's tasty treats and lavish gifts all to himself. Ren gives Erica some perspective when her own parents don't care enough to show up at all that weekend. Elsewhere, Adam learns that Dana is trying out for Juliet in the school play, and is determined to win the part of Romeo over the popular Andrew Gallery. Adam wins the part of Romeo, but the part of Juliet goes to Vic's daughter Asha. When Asha and Adam passionately kiss in rehearsal, Dana gets jealous, while Dave Kim insists that Asha must be into Adam because she scrawled "A.G." on her notebook. Vic learns from Miss Cinoman that the kiss was "sizzling", and he forces Principal Ball to clean up the script. This results in Asha quitting and Dana stepping in as Juliet. Adam then learns that Asha was just acting, and that the "A.G." on her notebook is for Andrew Gallery. He tells Dana that he only wanted to be Romeo because he didn't want to see her opposite Gallery, and Dana is pleased to hear this. However, when the two kiss during the play, Adam is shocked when he feels nothing. Note: This is the first appearance of Lauren (aka Ren.) Featured Song: "Every Little Thing She Does Is Magic" by The Police
146	6	"A 100% True Ghost Story"	Christine Lakin	Teleplay by : Amy Mass; Story by : Adam F. Goldberg & Amy Mass	October 30, 2019	706	4.02
After attending the Rocky Horror Picture Show for the first time, Barry is inspired to throw an epic Halloween party on campus, but Erica wants to stop him because she needs to study for a midterm and is determined to focus more on academics during her second attempt at college. This leads to the two arguing about the balance between hard work and letting off some steam while in school. At home, Beverly and Adam become convinced that there is a ghost in the house when Bev's newly acquired classical nude paintings keep falling off the wall. Thinking that both of them are morons for believing in ghosts, Murray invites Dr. Katman (Steve Guttenberg), a science teacher from William Penn, to come over and give legitimate reasons for the paintings falling. Bev counters by inviting a paranormal expert (Stephnie Weir) to the home. Featured Song: "Time Warp" by Richard O'Brien, Patricia Quinn, Nell Campbell, and Charles Gray
147	7	"WrestleMania"	Lew Schneider	Teleplay by : Erik Weiner; Story by : Adam F. Goldberg & Erik Weiner	November 6, 2019	707	4.22
Adam and Barry try to convince Murray to buy them tickets to WrestleMania IV. After first refusing, Pops helps Murray realize he should take any opportunity to spend time with his kids before they are gone away. They attempt to purchase tickets for the event, but find them sold out, forcing them to go to a sketchy scalper. When Murray models the embarrassing Andre the Giant outfit he plans to wear, his sons make plans to ditch him at the event. It turns out the tickets are fake and all three are kicked out of their seats, when Carlito confronts Adam and Barry. However, while being escorted out, Adam and Barry meet Hulk Hogan, who tells them they should appreciate a father who wants to spend time with them. Meanwhile, after two cars on the street have rocks thrown through their windshields, Beverly tries to organize a neighborhood watch with herself in charge. She is challenged for the position by Jane Bales (Leslie Grossman), who seems much better prepared. Featured Song: "Private Eyes" by Hall & Oates Guest Starring: Hulk Hogan as himself Carlito as Wrestler 7
148	8	"Angst-Giving"	Melissa Joan Hart	Teleplay by : Elizabeth Beckwith; Story by : Adam F. Goldberg	November 20, 2019	709	4.11
The annual Goldberg Thanksgiving event, dubbed "Angst-Giving" by Adam because of its dubious history in the household, lives up to its name when Murray's stern father Ben (Judd Hirsch) arrives and is his usual cranky self. Meanwhile, Murray's unreliable brother Marvin is tasked with picking up Erica and Barry from college. He gets lost on the drive home, taking the kids on a whirlwind trip through Pittsburgh and Nashville before they finally arrive for a day-late Thanksgiving dinner. By then, Murray and Ben have patched things up after Ben surprisingly admits that he'd like to spend more time with his son and grandchildren. Featured Song: "Everytime You Go Away" by Paul Young
149	9	"The Beverly Goldberg Cookbook: Part 2"	Lea Thompson	Story by : Adam F. Goldberg & Alison Rich; Teleplay by : Alison Rich	December 4, 2019	708	4.10
Beverly finally finds a publisher interested in putting out a cookbook with her recipes, but he wants her to tell the stories behind her dishes. The family history stories she writes are filled with gross, disgusting, tragic and generally unappetizing events. She gets Adam to clean it up, but the publisher says his spin is too "schmaltzy". She and Adam agree to work together on a version that is ultimately accepted by the publisher. Elsewhere, the roommate animosity between Erica and Barry has reached critical mass, so they get Geoff to agree to be a "Geoff-eree" and resolve all their disputes. When this too fails, Barry ultimately decides to move into the pad that his JTP pals (Andy, Naked Rob and Matt Bradley) all share. Erica then asks Geoff to move into the dorm room with her. Featured Song: "Goodbye to You" by Scandal
150	10	"It's a Wonderful Life"	Eric Dean Seaton	Story by : Adam F. Goldberg & Aadip Desai; Teleplay by : Aadip Desai	December 11, 2019	710	3.94
Beverly organizes another Goldbergs Christmas card family photo shoot in hopes of outdoing the Kremps this year, but as usual, it's a disaster. Geoff is excited about being in the photo, only to be disappointed when he learns that Erica doesn't want him to be a part of it. Erica later explains that having Geoff be part of the family scares her a bit, as she hasn't yet considered their long-term future together. She makes it up by booking a photo shoot for just the two of them. Meanwhile, the JTP is quickly getting tired of Barry pranking them and having no regard for their apartment or their possessions. Barry misinterprets Pops' advice and thinks he just needs a more epic prank. This of course backfires, causing the JTP to send a message by recruiting Johnny Atkins to take Barry's place. Barry finally realizes the error of his ways, and promises to make it up to his friends. Featured Song: "Pictures of You" by The Cure
151	11	"Pickleball"	Lew Schneider	Story by : Adam F. Goldberg & Langan Kingsley; Teleplay by : Langan Kingsley	January 15, 2020	711	3.59
Beverly decides to organize another 50th birthday party for Murray since she learned that he is actually one year younger than he thought, but Murray does not seem to care about that. Or does he? Meanwhile, Adam and Barry recruit former coach Mellor in order to prepare Adam for pickleball. Featured Song: "September" by Earth, Wind & Fire
152	12	"Game Night"	Nora Kirkpatrick	Story by : Adam F. Goldberg & Kristen Lange; Teleplay by : Kristen Lange	January 22, 2020	712	4.08
During game night at the Goldbergs, Geoff tries in vain to keep the secret that he's living in Erica's dorm. Beverly figures it out and is furious. Murray convinces her that not only are Erica and Geoff adults who can make their own decisions, but that Geoff is a really good guy who truly loves Erica. At school, Adam is paired up with popular girl Brea Bee as lab partners, and is shocked when she's nice to him and likes some of the same things. However, when Adam tries to approach Brea at lunch, he's shunned by Johnny Atkins and the other guys sitting with her. After getting some tips on dressing and acting cool from new guidance counselor Mr. Perott (Anthony Michael Hall), Adam is accepted into the clique with Brea and the guys, but quickly learns that popularity comes at a price when he sees what the cool kids really do at night. Adam later stands up to the cool kids, which Brea appreciates as she doesn't agree with most of their silly stunts. Featured Songs: "You Are" by Lionel Richie, "Black Betty" by Ram Jam Guest Starring: Anthony Michael Hall as Mr. Perott
153	13	"Geoff the Pleaser"	Christine Lakin	Mike Sikowitz	January 29, 2020	714	3.97
As Geoff tries to audit an art history class at Erica's college, he is constantly being hounded by his girlfriend and JTP pals for help whenever they get into a bind. Geoff goes to Murray for advice on how to say "no" without really saying it. After his friends see the error of their ways, Geoff tells Erica he wants to attend college for real. Elsewhere, Adam is excited about a school film festival contest until he goes to his favorite A-V store and sees the other Adam Goldberg working there after flaming out in Hollywood. This leads to Adam seriously questioning if he can turn his passion into a real career. Featured Song: "Never Surrender" by Corey Hart
154	14	"Preventa Mode"	Vern Davidson	Bill Callahan	February 12, 2020	716	3.88
Barry is attracted to his sociology teaching aide (Miranda Cosgrove) and asks her out on a date, to which she agrees. When Erica, suspicious after Barry gets the same grade as her on a paper, learns of their date, she suspects that Barry is using the relationship for a good grade and threatens to expose their relationship to the school. Meanwhile, Adam and Dana discover that their respective crushes – Brea Bee and Andrew Gallery – are asking each other to the school's annual ice dance. When Beverly finds out, she offers to break them up so Adam and Dana can be happy, a plan to which Dana happily agrees and Adam vehemently objects. Elsewhere, the rest of the JTP, single and dateless for Valentine's Day, decide to go on a "Palentine's Day" outing as a group. Featured Songs: "Home Sweet Home" by Mötley Crüe, "Candy Girl" by New Edition Guest Starring: Miranda Cosgrove as Elana Reid, Tommy Lee as Professor Lee
155	15	"Dave Kim's Party"	Lew Schneider	Story by : Adam F. Goldberg & Matt Roller; Teleplay by : Matt Roller	February 19, 2020	713	3.97
Adam says that Dave Kim is throwing a party at his home but without Dave's knowledge. He plans the party in hope that Brea will attend. The party soon gets out of control and Adam, Brea, Dave and even Johnny Atkins who is too scared by the party, receive unexpected help from Pops and his friends that Adam rejected earlier. Elsewhere, Geoff and the rest of the family have to bear Beverly's diva behavior after her cookbook is published Featured Song: "What I Like About You" by The Romantics
156	16	"Body Swap"	Lew Schneider	Marc Firek	February 26, 2020	715	3.76
Adam learns that students will be allowed to take their lunch off campus but it turns out he needs Beverly's signature in order to benefit this privilege. Beverly refuses so he forges a plan with his friends but the idea goes awry when Beverly opens a house restaurant. Meanwhile, as Geoff is not a student, he can't eat at the cafeteria until Barry suggests he could use his ID. But Geoff is mistaken by a teacher for Barry and soon, he decides to live as Barry Goldberg until the real Barry shows up, and wackiness ensues. Featured Song: "The Walls Came Down" by The Call
157	17	"A Fish Story"	Lew Schneider	Amy Mass	March 18, 2020	717	4.84
After seeing how well Chad Kremp and his father get along, and noticing how much Murray and Adam are frequently arguing with each other at home, Beverly tries to set the two up on a camping trip. The problem is, neither wants to do it. Instead, using Adam's video camera, Murray and Adam pretend to camp in a sporting goods store. However, their lie is soon discovered when the Kremps come over for dinner, and a disappointed Beverly reveals she just wanted Murray and Adam to get along. In the end, the two eventually bond while having a campout in the backyard, much to Beverly's delight. Meanwhile, Geoff tries to get Erica to rediscover her love for music. After seeing an acapella group is having auditions for an open spot, Geoff convinces her to audition, in which she wins the spot. However, she is later kicked out for being too bossy and negative. After she tries (and fails) to start a rival group out of spite, Geoff helps Erica realize the consequences of her actions, and she asks to be let back in the group, in which she succeeds. Featured Songs: "We Got the Beat" by The Go-Go's, "Shadows of the Night" by Pat Benatar
158	18	"Schmoopie's Big Adventure"	Jason Blount	Erik Weiner	March 25, 2020	718	4.66
When Beverly buys Adam a bike from the movie Pee-wee's Big Adventure, he decides to preserve it as a collectible instead of riding it. Bev becomes worried about Adam growing up, and steals the bike in order to teach him a lesson. Adam finds out and is angry at Beverly. But when it is stolen for real, she and Adam must retrieve it from a church donation center. Adam eventually steals the bike from the donation center but crashes and damages it in the process. However, Beverly fixes the bike and she and Adam repair their relationship in the end. Meanwhile, Erica's car receives a boot on the tire after she refuses to pay her long overdue parking tickets, and she gets a job working at Murray's store. However, she, Geoff, Barry, and Ren work together to make the furniture store an after-hours college lounge featuring alcohol and coffee. While Erica pays the debt, Murray finds out and is enraged. Despite his anger, he eventually allows Erica to keep working at the store after she becomes a successful salesperson. Featured Songs: "Crash" by The Primitives, "Tequila" by The Champs
159	19	"Island Time"	Robert Cohen	Annie Mebane	April 1, 2020	719	4.42
Barry and the JTP go to a cut-rate resort in Jamaica for spring break with Erica and her roommate Ren. To enjoy some perks, Barry and Ren pretend to be a newlywed couple that hasn't yet arrived. When Ren kisses Barry to keep up the ruse, he feels something and is certain that Ren did, too. At home, Beverly is disappointed when Adam scores poorly on the math portion of the PSAT, and requests that he see his guidance counselor about the importance of getting into a good college. Counselor Perott tells Adam that college isn't a requirement to become a great filmmaker, and even convinces Murray of the same when Bev sends him to complain. This leads to Bev forcing Adam to see Mr. Glascott instead of Mr. Perott. In the end, Mr. Perott says Adam should submit a play as part of his application to NYU, which works. Featured Song: "Once in a Lifetime" by Talking Heads
160	20	"The Return of the Formica King"	Lea Thompson	Aaron Kaczander	April 15, 2020	723	4.37
Murray gets an offer from Formica Mike (Richard Kind), the Formica King, to buy out Ottoman Empire. The offer has Beverly seeing visions of a second home on the Jersey Shore, but to her surprise, Murray admits he actually likes going to work despite all his complaints. Murray does, however, agree with Mike that the furniture business is changing and he has to keep up, so he proposes a merger, which Mike agrees to. At William Penn, Ms. Cinoman tells her class there will be no school musical this year because licensing fees have risen too high. Adam proposes that the class perform the musical he and Erica wrote five years ago, but says it needs a closing act. He asks Erica to help him compose the final act, but she is disinterested. Adam then gets Barry to help put his own "unique" twist on the story, certain that it will be so bad Erica will have no choice but to swoop in and fix it. Featured Songs: "You Can Call Me Al" by Paul Simon, "Sophisticated Girl" by Earl Rose
161	21	"Oates & Oates"	Lew Schneider	Alex Barnow & Chris Bishop	April 22, 2020	720	4.24
With Ren desperately needing acts for her Earth Day telethon, Barry tries to impress her by lining up Hall & Oates via a possible connection at a mutual dentist's office. When that fails, Barry enlists Adam's help in pretending to be Hall & Oates, but Barry is confused as to which performer is which and dresses as Oates, just as Adam does. Barry apologizes to Ren, who says their song got lots of donations because people thought it was a comedy act. She also says she's touched that he would go that far to impress her, and kisses him. At home, Beverly overhears Bill Lewis telling Murray that he's finally ready to move on from his ex-wife, and she becomes determined to set him up with someone. Unknown to Beverly, Bill has enlisted help from another yenta, Jane Bales, who sets him up with Dolores (Jessica St. Clair). The couple seems to hit it off, which makes Beverly want to break them up to spite Jane. But when she and Murray share a meal with Bill and Dolores, Bev sees that Dolores is actually good for him. Unfortunately, Murray breaks them up because he's concerned about his best friend getting heartbroken again. Murray later reunites Bill and Dolores, and finally opens up to Bill about how much their friendship means. Featured Song: "Maneater" by Hall & Oates Guest Starring: John Oates as John the Janitor
162	22	"The Fake-Up"	Lew Schneider	Alex Barnow & Chris Bishop	May 6, 2020	722	4.32
After Beverly catches Adam and Brea, who are now boyfriend-girlfriend, kissing in the basement, she begins interfering with their relationship. Agitated after she tags along on their planned date, the two agree to fake a break-up in order to keep Beverly away from them. But Beverly handles the news poorly and goes to Brea's house where she catches her and Adam hanging out. Adam then stands up to his mom, telling her he needs space when it comes to his relationship. Beverly reluctantly agrees to back off, understanding that Adam is getting older. Elsewhere, Lainey comes to town to meet her father's new girlfriend and asks to meet up with Barry. This catches Barry off-guard, as he's now in a relationship with Ren. Thinking Lainey wants to get back together, Barry asks Erica for help, but Lainey later shows up and explains to him she just wanted to apologize for not saying goodbye before she left, and that she still wants to be friends. However, Ren catches the two sharing a goodbye kiss, and breaks up with Barry. In the end, Erica explains the situation to Ren, stating that Barry has a good heart and really does want to be with her, not Lainey. Ren accepts the explanation and gets back together with Barry. Featured Song: "Should I Stay or Should I Go" by The Clash Guest Starring: AJ Michalka as Lainey Lewis
163	23	"Pretty in Pink"	Ryan Krayser	Alex Barnow & Chris Bishop	May 13, 2020	721	4.13
Adam and Brea are set to go to prom together, but Adam worries that Brea will be Prom Queen and he will not end up as Prom King, prompting her to desert him for the King. He goes to Beverly for help, but she gets prom cancelled after meeting with Principal Ball and Mr. Woodburn. A furious Adam finds out and gets prom back on, then gleefully tells Brea. Despite this, Brea cancels their date, hurt by the fact that Adam thinks she would ditch him. On prom night, unwilling to see his son sad and lonely at home, Murray encourages Adam to go win back Brea, saying that his "movie moment" will only come around once in his life, and this is it. After he explains how much he truly loves her, Adam wins back Brea and they end up together at prom. Meanwhile, Geoff learns his dad is in the hospital due to a heart issue, and Erica struggles to empathize with Geoff's feelings, upsetting him and his family. Determined to fix everything, she asks Barry (who, by contrast, is a great help to Geoff and his family at the hospital) for advice on how to be more compassionate, but his methods fail miserably for her. Geoff later tells Erica that he doesn't want or expect her to be like Barry, and is just happy that she cares enough to be there for him. Featured Songs: "Wake Me Up Before You Go-Go" by Wham!, "If You Leave" by Orchestral Manoeuvres in the Dark

== Ratings ==
Viewership and ratings per episode of The Goldbergs season 7
No.	Title	Air date	Rating/share (18–49)	Viewers (millions)	DVR (18–49)	DVR viewers (millions)	Total (18–49)	Total viewers (millions)
1	"Vacation"	September 25, 2019	1.0/6	4.44	0.5	—N/a	1.5	—N/a
2	"Dana's Back"	October 2, 2019	1.0/5	4.27	0.4	—N/a	1.4	—N/a
3	"Food in a Geoffy"	October 9, 2019	1.0/5	4.49	0.5	—N/a	1.5	—N/a
4	"Animal House"	October 16, 2019	1.0/5	4.10	0.4	—N/a	1.4	—N/a
5	"Parents Thursday"	October 23, 2019	0.9/5	3.91	0.4	—N/a	1.3	—N/a
6	"A 100% True Ghost Story"	October 30, 2019	0.9/4	4.02	0.4	1.20	1.3	5.21
7	"WrestleMania"	November 6, 2019	0.9/5	4.22	0.4	1.15	1.3	5.36
8	"Angst-Giving"	November 20, 2019	0.9/5	4.11	0.4	1.22	1.3	5.33
9	"The Beverly Goldberg Cookbook: Part 2"	December 4, 2019	0.8/5	4.10	0.4	1.19	1.2	5.29
10	"It’s a Wonderful Life"	December 11, 2019	0.8/4	3.94	TBD	TBD	TBD	TBD
11	"Pickleball"	January 15, 2020	0.7/4	3.59	TBD	TBD	TBD	TBD
12	"Game Night"	January 22, 2020	0.8/5	4.08	TBD	TBD	TBD	TBD
13	"Geoff the Pleaser"	January 29, 2020	0.9/5	3.97	TBD	TBD	TBD	TBD
14	"Preventa Mode"	February 12, 2020	0.8	3.89	TBD	TBD	TBD	TBD
15	"Dave Kim’s Party"	February 19, 2020	0.8	3.97	TBD	TBD	TBD	TBD
16	"Body Swap (FKA Off-Campus Lunch)"	February 26, 2020	0.8	3.76	TBD	TBD	TBD	TBD
17	"A Fish Story"	March 18, 2020	1.1	4.84	TBD	TBD	TBD	TBD
18	"Schmoopie's Big Adventure"	March 25, 2020	0.9	4.66	TBD	TBD	TBD	TBD
19	"Island Time"	April 1, 2020	0.9	4.42	TBD	TBD	TBD	TBD
20	"The Return of the Formica King"	April 15, 2020	0.9	4.37	TBD	TBD	TBD	TBD
21	"Oates & Oates"	April 22, 2020	0.8	4.24	TBD	TBD	TBD	TBD
22	"The Fake-Up"	May 6, 2020	0.8	4.32	TBD	TBD	TBD	TBD
23	"Pretty in Pink"	May 13, 2020	0.8	4.13	TBD	TBD	TBD	TBD
