= The Goldbergs season 9 =

Season of television series

The Goldbergs
- Season 9
- Promotional poster
- Starring: Wendi McLendon-Covey; Sean Giambrone; Troy Gentile; Hayley Orrantia; Jeff Garlin; Sam Lerner
- No. of episodes: 22

Release
- Original network: ABC
- Original release: September 22, 2021 – May 18, 2022

Season chronology
- ← Previous; Season 8 Next → Season 10

The ninth season of the American television comedy series The Goldbergs premiered on September 22, 2021.

This is the first season without George Segal as Albert "Pops" Solomon, as Segal died in March 2021. The Pops character appears only in flashbacks in the season's first episode, which is dedicated to the actor.

Season 9 is also the last with Jeff Garlin as Murray. On December 15, 2021, it was announced that Garlin was leaving the show effective immediately due to multiple misconduct allegations and HR investigations. The show was filming the fifteenth episode at the time so from that episode onward, Garlin's character continued to appear on the show portrayed via the use of outtakes, a stand-in, and CGI.

In January 2022, the season's length was increased from 18 to 22 episodes. In April 2022, the series was renewed for a tenth season, which was later revealed to be its final season in February 2023.

== Plot ==
After a proper tribute to Pops, the season focuses on Adam's senior year and high school graduation, Erica and Geoff's wedding, and Barry's ongoing relationship with Joanne. Adam and Dave Kim are accepted to New York University while Brea Bee is accepted to Brown, and sensing a long-distance relationship wouldn't work out, Adam and Brea break up. Beverly buys the house next door, hoping Erica and Geoff will eventually move there, but she ends up renting it out to Glascott instead. While the family is attending Adam's graduation, Erica announces she's pregnant with Beverly's first grandchild.

== Cast ==
=== Main cast ===
- Wendi McLendon-Covey as Beverly Goldberg
- Sean Giambrone as Adam Goldberg
- Troy Gentile as Barry Goldberg
- Hayley Orrantia as Erica Goldberg
- Sam Lerner as Geoff Schwartz
- Jeff Garlin as Murray Goldberg

=== Recurring cast ===
- David Koechner as Bill Lewis
- Tim Meadows as Jon Glascott
- Stephen Tobolowsky as Principal Earl Ball
- Sadie Stanley as Brea Bee
- Ken Lerner as Lou Schwartz
- Mindy Sterling as Linda Schwartz
- Beth Triffon as Joanne Schwartz
- Jennifer Irwin as Virginia "Ginzy" Kremp
- Stephanie Courtney as Essie Karp
- Erinn Hayes as Jane Bales
- Noah Munck as "Naked Rob" Smith
- Matt Bush as Andy Cogan
- Shayne Topp as Matt Bradley
- Kenny Ridwan as Dave Kim
- Judd Hirsch as Ben "Pop-Pop" Goldberg

== Episodes ==
| No. overall | No. in season | Title | Directed by | Written by | Original release date | Prod. code | U.S. viewers (millions) |
|---|---|---|---|---|---|---|---|
| 186 | 1 | "The Goldbergs' Excellent Adventure" | Lew Schneider | David Guarascio | September 22, 2021 | 901 | 3.62 |
The season nine premiere revolves around the iconic '80s family paying tribute to Pops. Together they venture down memory lane by visiting Pops' favorite stomping grounds. Adam Goldberg, forever with camera in hand, captures the outing - theming it to "Bill & Ted's Excellent Adventure." Hijinks and hilarity ensue, and we are reminded that there is no bond greater than family. Featured Songs: "Forever Young" by Alphaville, "Santa Claus Is Coming to Town" by Fred Astaire and The Westminster Children’s Choir, and 15-second version of "Santa Claus Is Coming to Town" by Fred Astaire (without speech and The Westminster Children’s Choir.)
| 187 | 2 | "Horse Play" | Lew Schneider | Mike Sikowitz | September 29, 2021 | 902 | 3.17 |
Adam and Brea eagerly open their acceptance packets from NYU. Brea learns she has been accepted, but Adam is shocked to see Beverly's name on his acceptance letter. Beverly admits she applied so she could accompany her schmoo to college, but Adam has unfortunately been put on a wait list. Bev and Adam go to Glascott for advice, and Glascott strongly encourages Adam to visit the NYU acceptance department to make his case without Beverly. After Adam twice fails to convince the dean of admissions to reconsider his application, Beverly can't help but jump in. Elsewhere, Erica learns that Lou Schwartz's animosity toward her stems from him believing that she once put his prized porcelain horse figurines in a compromising position as a joke, resulting in one being chipped. In reality, it was Lou's daughter, Joanne, who pulled the prank and then blamed it on Erica. Featured Song: "Waiting for a Girl Like You" by Foreigner
| 188 | 3 | "Riptide Waters" | Jason Blount | Peter Dirksen & Jonathan Howard | October 6, 2021 | 903 | 3.25 |
Erica is completely stressed as Beverly takes total control of the wedding planning, leaving Geoff to mediate between mother and daughter. Meanwhile, Glascott is circulating a petition to get the local water park shut down because he got injured there, leading Barry and Adam to try and save the park from closure. Featured Song: "Fall on Me" by R.E.M.
| 189 | 4 | "The William Penn Years" | Jason Blount | Aaron Kaczander | October 13, 2021 | 904 | 3.21 |
Principal Ball recruits Adam to videotape the seniors' final football game between William Penn and arch-rival Germantown, but Adam's disinterest in sports leads him to become distracted and miss filming William Penn's winning touchdown. This earns him the ire of all the seniors, so he tries to make up for it by creating a touching high school memory video. Meanwhile, Bev learns from realtor Jane Bales that the house next door is up for sale, though it's owned by the cranky Mr. Wofsy (Dan Lauria), whom Murray has crossed in the past. When Bev and Murray see many features in Wofsy's house that they don't have, Bev thinks buying it will convince her children to stay home. However, when Jane points out flaws in the Goldberg's house while giving a tour to a potential buyer, Murray decides there are too many memories in the home to leave. Featured Song: "With a Little Help from My Friends" by The Beatles, covered by Hayley Orrantia
| 190 | 5 | "An Itch Like No Other" | Christine Lakin | David Guarascio | October 20, 2021 | 905 | 2.91 |
Having rented the house next door to Jon Glascott, Beverly gets tired of his extreme neighborliness and round-the-clock visits. Meanwhile, Murray gets a new grill and wants to initiate it with a neighborhood barbecue. Bev encourages Glascott to go on a canoeing trip with Mr. Woodburn on the same day as the barbecue, but Jon returns from the trip early to see the barbecue in progress. Elsewhere, Barry catches poison ivy on his bottom and needs constant care from Erica and Geoff, which the couple uses as a way to prepare for having a child someday. Featured Song: "Catch My Fall" by Billy Idol
| 191 | 6 | "The Hunt for the Great Albino Pumpkin" | Christine Lakin | Elizabeth Beckwith | October 27, 2021 | 906 | 3.23 |
Upset over having his first Halloween without Pops, Adam backs out of going to the school Halloween dance with Brea Bee and Matthew Schernecke. Seeing Adam depressed, Pop-Pop gets him involved in going door-to-door looking for a white pumpkin he says was stolen off his porch. This turns out to be a lie, fabricated by Pop-Pop to give Adam a Halloween adventure like he and Pops used to share. Elsewhere, Barry finds out that Joanne is unaware of his Big Tasty persona, due to him focusing more on career goals and his pre-med studies. He sets out to prove he hasn't lost his old self, even visiting Elvira at a signing event to present a new rap. While the rap flops, Barry realizes he has gained something better: a loving and supportive girlfriend. Featured Song: "Monster Mash" by Bobby Pickett
| 192 | 7 | "The Rose-Kissy Thing" | Jay Chandrasekhar | Mike Sikowitz | November 3, 2021 | 907 | 3.28 |
After seeing the mothers of William Penn athletes getting a rose and a kiss in a year-end ceremony, Beverly is determined to have an award night for non-athletes so she can have her moment in the spotlight with Adam. However, an embarrassed Adam is just as determined to dissuade her. Meanwhile, Erica struggles to find a friend willing to help with her wedding planning, given that her former companions (Lainey, Valley Erica and Carla) are either out of town or too busy. She settles on Joanne Schwartz, but Joanne's help quickly becomes unwelcome. Featured Song: "Every Rose Has Its Thorn" by Poison
| 193 | 8 | "A Light Thanksgiving Nosh" | Nicole Treston Abranian | Peter Dirksen & Jonathan Howard | November 17, 2021 | 909 | 3.43 |
When Beverly learns that Linda Schwartz will host Thanksgiving this year, she becomes concerned that her role as family hostess – and more importantly as Erica's mom – is threatened. Determined to regain her status, Bev holds a pre-Thanksgiving "nosh" (with all the traditional Thanksgiving food fare) on Wednesday. Meanwhile, Pop-Pop surprises the family by showing up with a new "lady friend," and his attempts to impress her have him revising his past role in the family. Featured Song: "In Your Eyes" by Peter Gabriel
| 194 | 9 | "Tennis People" | Jay Chandrasekhar | Chris Bishop & Alex Barnow | December 1, 2021 | 908 | 3.15 |
After weeks of waiting, Adam finally receives news that he has been accepted into NYU. His excitement is soon diminished when he learns Brea has been accepted into her dream school, Brown University. Fearing the distance will affect their relationship, Adam attempts to find ways to keep his girlfriend close. Meanwhile, with Virginia's help, Beverly begins looking for venues to hold Erica's wedding shower. She discovers the tennis club of her nemesis, Jane Bales, is a perfect location and becomes determined to earn membership, even if it means embarrassing herself. Featured Song: "Celebration" by Kool & the Gang
| 195 | 10 | "You Only Die Once, or Twice, But Never Three Times" | Nicole Treston Abranian | Vicky Castro | January 5, 2022 | 910 | 3.36 |
Having watched the James Bond film A View to a Kill, Barry becomes determined to make his own Bond film, starring himself as "Barry Bond", with Adam's help. Hoping to impress Joanne, Barry screens the finished video for her, only to have her laugh at how corny it is. Barry gets angry with his girlfriend, then learns a painstaking truth: that his family and friends have been tiptoeing around his over-sensitivity for years. Meanwhile, Beverly learns that Murray's partner, Formica Mike, is living in the store after he and wife Fran have separated. Determined to get the two back together to show Erica that not all marriages are doomed, Bev enlists the help of Jane Bales. However, Mike becomes attracted to Jane's looks while Jane is attracted to his wealth. Undeterred, Bev gets Fran to date Nick Mellor in order to make Mike jealous, but Fran and Nick also become mutually attracted. Featured Song: "Something So Strong" by Crowded House
| 196 | 11 | "Hip-Shaking and Booty-Quaking" | Christine Lakin | Aaron Kaczander | January 12, 2022 | 911 | 3.50 |
Inspired by the movie Fame, Beverly insists William Penn faculty do something special for the seniors, instead of the decades-old tradition of just singing the Quaker song. While initially disinterested, the faculty eventually comes around. Meanwhile, Erica and Geoff start to realize they are becoming as boring as other engaged couples on campus, and set out to throw a rager of a party to prove otherwise. Featured Song: "Fame" by Irene Cara
| 197 | 12 | "The Kissing Bandits" | Christine Lakin | Elizabeth Beckwith | January 19, 2022 | 912 | 3.17 |
Upon their return home from college orientation, Adam and Brea each confess a secret that could affect the future of their relationship; Barry and Beverly openly admit their love of ice-dancing and explore their shared passion together. Featured Song: "Nothing Compares 2 U" by Sinéad O'Connor, covered by Hayley Orrantia
| 198 | 13 | "A Peck of Familial Love" | Princess Monique | Andrew Secunda | February 2, 2022 | 913 | 3.48 |
As Adam and Brea navigate their breakup, Barry and Erica learn of how close the Schwartz's were for Valentines Day. Featured Song: "Open Arms" by Journey
| 199 | 14 | "The Steve Weekend" | Vern Davidson | Vicky Castro | February 23, 2022 | 914 | 3.21 |
Barry comes face-to-face with his ex-girlfriends and their current boyfriends during Erica and Geoff's joint bachelor/bachelorette party; Adam intervenes when Geoff's father takes over the planning of the wedding video. Featured Song: "Higher Love" by Steve Winwood
| 200 | 15 | "The Wedding" | Matt Mira | Chris Bishop & Alex Barnow | March 2, 2022 | 915 | 3.31 |
After learning no one made the deposit on the wedding venue, Geoff scrambles to help fix the oversight before Beverly finds out. To make matters worse, a major winter storm is imminent which could jeopardize the entire event. Featured Songs: "The Final Countdown" by Europe, "Right Here Waiting" by Richard Marx Guest Starring: Richard Marx as himself
| 201 | 16 | "The Downtown Boys" | Matt Mira | Erik Weiner | March 16, 2022 | 916 | 2.79 |
Barry and the rest of the JTP try to reclaim their youth by forming a boy band, but quickly learn they aren't kids anymore. Meanwhile, Adam has the keys to Erica's downtown apartment, but realizes he's not cut out for city life. Featured Song: "Overkill" by Men at Work
| 202 | 17 | "The Strangest Affair of All Time" | Lew Schneider | Carly Garber & Aleah Welsh | March 23, 2022 | 917 | 2.94 |
When Murray goes out of town, Jane Bales attempts to make a power grab at the Ottoman Empire, forcing Beverly to retaliate; Adam is thrilled to learn that Dave Kim also plans to attend NYU. Featured Song: "Don't Change" by INXS Note: This episode aired on the one-year anniversary of George Segal's passing.
| 203 | 18 | "School-ercise" | Lew Schneider | Chris Bishop & Alex Barnow | April 13, 2022 | 918 | 2.95 |
When Beverly steps in as PE coach at William Penn Academy, Adam reluctantly takes her Jazzercise class but it turns to embarrassment when Beverly bends over during class and farts; Brea tries to show Adam his mother's good intentions; Barry and Geoff find themselves both vying for the same medical internship. Featured Song: "You Got It" by Roy Orbison
| 204 | 19 | "Grand Theft Scooter" | Nicole Treston Abranian | David Guarascio | April 20, 2022 | 919 | 2.97 |
Beverly decides to join Adam and Brea on their much-anticipated beachside vacation in Miami, and things become complicated when they encounter one of Pops' ex-girlfriends. Barry's joy after acing the MCAT is short-lived when Erica becomes the local hero by saving a man from choking at the mall food court. Featured Song: "One Way or Another" by Blondie, covered by Hayley Orrantia
| 205 | 20 | "Sunday Chow-Fun Day" | Nicole Treston Abranian | Mike Sikowitz | May 4, 2022 | 920 | 2.98 |
With Adam's graduation approaching, Beverly debates staying on as William Penn Academy's Quaker Warden; Erica tries to get out of the Schwartz's longstanding tradition of dinner together every Sunday. Featured Song: "Mad About You" by Belinda Carlisle
| 206 | 21 | "One Exquisite Evening With Madonna" | Lew Schneider | Alex Barnow & Chris Bishop | May 11, 2022 | 921 | 2.63 |
After a mold issue forces Erica and Geoff to stay at the Goldberg house, thanks to Erica constantly leaving wet towels on the bathroom floor much to the tidy Geoff's annoyance, Beverly senses tensions in their marriage and tries to impart a little marital advice. Meanwhile, Adam has to give Brea an "I.O.U. one exquisite evening with Madonna" on their anniversary because tickets are sold out. But Brea's "cool" older sister Claire is in town and sets up Adam with a scalper, making his dream evening with Brea come true. Because Brea really wants to spend time with Claire, Adam buys tickets for all three of them. However, Claire soon sells her ticket and bails, disappointing her little sister again. Featured Song: "Crazy for You" by Madonna
| 207 | 22 | "Adam Graduates!" | Lew Schneider | Alex Barnow & Chris Bishop | May 18, 2022 | 922 | 2.78 |
Graduation day is approaching and everyone, especially Adam, is ready – except for Beverly who is not coping well with the idea of an empty nest. Meanwhile, with Geoff's encouragement, Erica decides to try out for Cyndi Lauper as a one-time backup singer replacement. Ultimately, resurrecting her singing dreams doesn't manifest, but bigger and exciting new beginnings await her and the Goldbergs as it is revealed she is pregnant. Featured Song: "Time After Time" by Cyndi Lauper

== Ratings ==
Viewership and ratings per episode of The Goldbergs season 9
| No. | Title | Air date | Rating/share (18–49) | Viewers (millions) | DVR (18–49) | DVR viewers (millions) | Total (18–49) | Total viewers (millions) |
|---|---|---|---|---|---|---|---|---|
| 1 | "The Goldbergs' Excellent Adventure" | September 22, 2021 | 0.7/5 | 3.62 | —N/a | —N/a | —N/a | —N/a |
| 2 | "Horse Play" | September 29, 2021 | 0.6/5 | 3.17 | —N/a | —N/a | —N/a | —N/a |
| 3 | "Riptide Waters" | October 6, 2021 | 0.6/5 | 3.25 | —N/a | —N/a | —N/a | —N/a |
| 4 | "The William Penn Years" | October 13, 2021 | 0.6/5 | 3.21 | 0.2 | 0.76 | 0.8 | 3.97 |
| 5 | "An Itch Like No Other" | October 20, 2021 | 0.5/4 | 2.91 | 0.2 | 0.72 | 0.7 | 3.63 |
| 6 | "The Hunt for the Great Albino Pumpkin" | October 27, 2021 | 0.6/4 | 3.23 | —N/a | —N/a | —N/a | —N/a |
| 7 | "The Rose-Kissy Thing" | November 3, 2021 | 0.6/4 | 3.28 | —N/a | —N/a | —N/a | —N/a |
| 8 | "A Light Thanksgiving Nosh" | November 17, 2021 | 0.6/4 | 3.43 | 0.2 | 0.76 | 0.8 | 4.19 |
| 9 | "Tennis People (FKA I Got In/Tennis Club)" | December 1, 2021 | 0.5/4 | 3.15 | 0.2 | 0.73 | 0.7 | 3.88 |
| 10 | "You Only Die Once, or Twice, but Never Three Times" | January 5, 2022 | 0.6/4 | 3.36 | TBD | TBD | TBD | TBD |
| 11 | "Hip-Shaking and Booty-Quaking" | January 12, 2022 | 0.7/4 | 3.50 | TBD | TBD | TBD | TBD |
| 12 | "The Kissing Bandits" | January 19, 2022 | 0.6/4 | 3.17 | TBD | TBD | TBD | TBD |
| 13 | "A Peck of Familial Love" | February 2, 2022 | 0.7/5 | 3.48 | TBD | TBD | TBD | TBD |
| 14 | "The Steve Weekend" | February 23, 2022 | 0.6/4 | 3.21 | TBD | TBD | TBD | TBD |
| 15 | "The Wedding" | March 2, 2022 | 0.6/4 | 3.31 | TBD | TBD | TBD | TBD |
| 16 | "The Downtown Boys" | March 16, 2022 | 0.5/3 | 2.79 | TBD | TBD | TBD | TBD |
| 17 | "The Strangest Affair of All Time" | March 23, 2022 | 0.5/3 | 2.94 | TBD | TBD | TBD | TBD |
| 18 | "School-ercise" | April 13, 2022 | 0.5/3 | 2.95 | TBD | TBD | TBD | TBD |
| 19 | "Grand Theft Scooter" | April 20, 2022 | 0.5/3 | 2.97 | TBD | TBD | TBD | TBD |
| 20 | "Sunday Chow-Fun Day" | May 4, 2022 | 0.4/2 | 2.98 | TBD | TBD | TBD | TBD |
| 21 | "One Exquisite Evening With Madonna" | May 11, 2022 | 0.4/2 | 2.63 | TBD | TBD | TBD | TBD |
| 22 | "Adam Graduates!" | May 18, 2022 | 0.4/2 | 2.78 | TBD | TBD | TBD | TBD |
