= The Goldbergs season 10 =

The Goldbergs
- Season 10
- Promotional poster
- Starring: Wendi McLendon-Covey; Sean Giambrone; Troy Gentile; Hayley Orrantia; Sam Lerner
- No. of episodes: 22

Release
- Original network: ABC
- Original release: September 21, 2022 – May 3, 2023

Season chronology
- ← Previous; Season 9

The tenth and final season of the American television comedy series The Goldbergs premiered on September 21, 2022. In February 2023, it was announced that this season would be the last, and the final episode aired on May 3, 2023.

== Plot ==
With Beverly alone in the Goldberg house following three high school graduations and the death of Murray, (Note: Murray's 1980s death is ignored in the 1990s-set spin-off sequel series Schooled (2019–2020).) several story lines result in the children continuing to live there while Pop-Pop also moves in after an apartment fire. Adam delays attending NYU to help his grieving mother and gets a P.A. job with David Hasselhoff's film crew before moving on to a classic diner run by former classmates Johnny Atkins and Carla Mann, where he develops a relationship with waitress Carmen. Barry finds himself with no place to stay while attending medical school and is forced to share a bedroom with Adam while Erica and Geoff turn his old room into their baby's room, but as his relationship with Joanne grows, the couple moves into Pop-Pop's repaired home and later elopes. Erica graduates from college, gives birth to Muriel Allison Schwartz and stays home to raise her as she wavers on whether or not she wants to attend law school. Beverly enjoys being "Bubbie" to Muriel and continues her role as Quaker Warden at the high school, where she develops feelings for Adam's former guidance counselor Joe Perrott but later realizes they have nothing in common. The series ends with Beverly reconnecting with an old high school flame, Erica and Geoff celebrating their daughter's first birthday, Barry and Joanne celebrating their unexpected marriage, and Adam and his girlfriend Carmen figure out what's next in life.

== Cast ==
=== Main cast ===
- Wendi McLendon-Covey as Beverly Goldberg
- Sean Giambrone as Adam Goldberg
- Troy Gentile as Barry Goldberg
- Hayley Orrantia as Erica Goldberg
- Sam Lerner as Geoff Schwartz

=== Recurring cast ===
- Judd Hirsch as Ben "Pop-Pop" Goldberg
- Tim Meadows as Jon Glascott
- Ken Lerner as Lou Schwartz
- Mindy Sterling as Linda Schwartz
- Beth Triffon as Joanne Schwartz
- Jennifer Irwin as Virginia "Ginzy" Kremp
- Stephanie Courtney as Essie Karp
- Noah Munck as "Naked Rob" Smith
- Matt Bush as Andy Cogan
- Shayne Topp as Matt Bradley
- Isabella Gomez as Carmen
- Anthony Michael Hall as Mr. Perott

=== Guest cast ===
- Sadie Stanley as Brea Bee
- Dan Fogler as Marvin Goldberg
- Kenny Ridwan as Dave Kim
- Sean Marquette as Johnny Atkins
- Alex Jennings as Carla Mann
- Erinn Hayes as Jane Bales
- Kimiko Glenn as Lauren
- Steve Guttenberg as Dr. Katman
- AJ Michalka as Lainey Lewis
- David Koechner as Bill Lewis
- Natalie Alyn Lind as Dana Caldwell
- Alexis G. Zall as Jackie Geary

== Episodes ==
No. overall	No. in season	Title	Directed by	Written by	Original release date	Prod. code	U.S. viewers (millions)
208	1	"If You Build It"	Lew Schneider	Elizabeth Beckwith	September 21, 2022	1001	2.53
With Pop-Pop moving in due to a fire at his condo, Adam must bunk with Barry, who has returned with Erica to help Bev deal with Murray's death. Barry torments Adam like days of old and forces him to watch the film Field of Dreams multiple times. Adam uses baby monitors that Erica and Geoff bought for their pending child to prank Barry into thinking he's hearing the classic line from the film "If you build it, he will come." Barry and the JTP begin building a whiffle ball park in the back yard. Adam has a good laugh at Barry's expense, until he's told that the real theme behind Field of Dreams is the main character wishing he had one last "catch" with his deceased father. Realizing the film was Barry's way of grieving for Murray, Adam sets out to make things right. Meanwhile, Erica becomes upset when she sees Murray's favorite chair has disappeared. Beverly says she put it out to the curb as a means of closure, but when they go out to retrieve it, the chair is gone. Fortunately, they soon discover that Pop-Pop took the chair and put it in the baby's room. Featured Song: "Faithfully" by Journey
209	2	"That's a Schwartz Man"	Lew Schneider	David Guarascio	September 28, 2022	1002	2.14
Geoff's father uses a jewelry eyepiece to look at Erica's ultrasound photo, and claims to know the sex of the baby. Though he and Erica agreed to be surprised, Geoff can't help but look. While he and Lou determine it to be a boy, Erica later peeks at her file folder and sees "F". thinking it's a girl. The doctor tells the couple that Geoff in fact saw a pinky finger in the ultrasound photo, while the "F" in the file was in reference to Erica, not the baby. The two recommit to not wanting to know the sex. Meanwhile, David Hasselhoff is in town to shoot some scenes. While Barry schemes to get an autograph, Adam visits Hasselhoff's trailer asking for a job. Hasselhoff refuses, but Adam lies to Beverly and says he got a job at the film site. After Beverly confronts Hasselhoff (bringing him a shrimp parm dish), he says he never gave Adam a job. Adam has to confess to Mom that he doesn't feel ready for college and wants to take a gap year. Mom understands, and they return to Hasselhoff's trailer. The actor tells Adam he can get him production assistant work, as long as Bev keeps bringing him shrimp parm. Featured Song: "Let's Go" by The Cars Note: The title refers to the Dean Martin song "That's Amore".
210	3	"Jenkintown After Dark"	David Katzenberg	Mike Sikowitz	October 5, 2022	1003	2.25
Adam finds his P.A. work on the movie set to be dreadfully boring, while Brea is having difficulty adjusting to college life at Brown. However, when Adam calls Brea, he brags about how fulfilling his film work is while she lies about how well she's doing at Brown. Brea takes a bus back home and reconnects with Adam, the two then deciding to be honest with each other. While Brea expresses wishes to drop out of college, Beverly talks her out of it. Elsewhere, Joanne Schwartz has landed her first job as an associate at a big law firm. Barry piggybacks on her success, enjoying perks such as free sports tickets and riding around in her sleek company car, and he begins lording his higher socio-economic status over the JTP. Unfortunately, Barry doesn't live the high life for long, as Joanne becomes dissatisfied with her company only helping rich people get richer, saying that's not why she got into law. When her parents express disappointment over Joanne quitting, it's Barry who steps in and says they should be proud that their daughter has principles and is sticking to them. Featured Song: "Missing You" by John Waite
211	4	"Man of the House"	David Katzenberg	Vanessa McCarthy	October 12, 2022	1004	2.40
Barry tries to take on a fatherly role for Adam in the absence of Murray. Adam learns that the film crew is wrapping up in Philly and moving back to Hollywood, meaning his P.A. job is ending. He cashes in a favor that David Hasselhoff owes him to get the actor to visit with Barry and convince him that he doesn't need to replace his father. Meanwhile, Erica has managed to graduate college while pregnant, but Bev and Geoff are too stricken with "baby fever" to realize it. Featured Song: "Pomp and Circumstance"
212	5	"Uncle-ing"	Jason Blount	Mike Sikowitz	October 19, 2022	1005	2.32
Adam and Barry want to be good uncles to Erica's child, so they visit their goofy, unreliable Uncle Marvin to make notes on how an uncle should not act. But Marvin surprisingly comes through when Erica goes into labor and Bev is stranded at the beach house. Bev makes it in time to help Erica through her labor, and the latter gives birth to a healthy daughter that she names Muriel Allison (after Murray and Pops). Featured Song: "Heaven" by Bryan Adams
213	6	"DKNY"	Jason Blount	Elizabeth Beckwith	October 26, 2022	1006	2.58
Adam makes a trip to New York to visit Dave Kim at college, hitching a ride with Mr. Glascott who has entered a Halloween Prince impersonation contest. Adam finds Dave's new friends to be extremely condescending, while Dave himself has reinvented himself as DJ DKNY (Dave Kim – New York). When Adam has had enough and wonders what happened to the old Dave Kim, Dave blames Adam for taking a gap year and leaving him alone to find his way. Adam then salvages Dave's lame Halloween party by convincing a bunch of college kids that Prince will be there, which is simply Glascott in costume. Back home, Barry wants to one-up the Kremp's Halloween yard display, so he buys an old ice cream truck from a police auction and enlists the JTP to dress up as "scary" ice cream vendors. The plan backfires, as the kids find Barry and the JTP to be funny, not scary, and ask for ice cream. Meanwhile, Beverly has inserted herself as the primary caretaker for baby Muriel, infuriating Geoff who insists he needs bonding time with his daughter. Featured Song: "Let's Go Crazy" by Prince and The Revolution
214	7	"Rhinestones and Roses"	Princess Monique	David Guarascio	November 2, 2022	1007	2.54
The country line dance craze has hit Jenkintown, so Barry and Joanne rope the JTP into trying it. When Jane Bales, who is also into line dancing, makes fun of Beverly being a grandmother, the latter tries to prove she's still youthful by attending the next line dance night at a local tavern. However, Bev's inexperience causes her to fall on the dance floor, twisting her ankle and embarrassing herself. When Jane shows true pity instead of laughing, Bev goes into a funk about getting old. It takes Erica to snap her out of it. Meanwhile, Adam has too much free time after losing his movie set job, and starts hanging out with Pop-Pop. After Adam lands a job as a server at a 50's-themed diner managed by Johnny Atkins, Pop-Pop becomes Adam's worst nightmare of a customer and gets his grandson fired. Pop-Pop later admits he misses having Adam around, and after apologizing, he gets Adam re-hired. Featured Song: "Copperhead Road" by Steve Earle
215	8	"Another Turkey in the Trot"	Princess Monique	Alex Barnow & Chris Bishop	November 16, 2022	1008	2.64
Geoff and Erica are stressed over matters related to the baby, while, unusually, Beverly is frazzled over Thanksgiving. Adam sabotages Geoff in a foot race where contestants wear turkey costumes. Murray's brother Marvin arrives and the family talk about how the holiday feels different due to the loss. Featured Song: "Changes" by David Bowie
216	9	"Million Dollar Reward"	Lew Schneider	Mike Sikowitz	November 30, 2022	1009	2.52
Adam skips out on eating dinner with Beverly to hang out with coworkers, including one named Carmen, for whom he develops feelings. Barry struggles with the academic rigors of medical school. Featured Song: "Something About You" by Level 42
217	10	"Worst Grinch Ever"	Lew Schneider	Vanessa McCarthy	December 7, 2022	1010	2.51
Erica buys a Christmas-themed toy and various other items with the same theme for Muriel, much to Beverly's chagrin because the family is Jewish and celebrates Hanukkah. Beverly tries to stop Erica from exposing Muriel to Christmas traditions. Meanwhile, Adam discovers Brea is dating someone else and struggles with the notion. The JTP host a holiday party.
218	11	"Blade Runner: The Musical"	Princess Monique	Erik Weiner	January 11, 2023	1011	2.63
Adam is feeling uninspired, in a creative slump. Using her influence as "Quaker Warden", Beverly pulls some strings and Adam is installed as the director of the William Penn Academy musical, but he scraps the original plan and makes the students put on his own musical based on the film Blade Runner. Geoff struggles to find the fun in hanging out with the JTP as a new father.
219	12	"Amadoofus"	Princess Monique	David Guarascio	January 18, 2023	1012	2.69
Dave Kim has written a script for a parody of the film Amadeus after having taken a screenwriting class at NYU and asks Adam to read it; Adam is jealous because of its high quality and resolves to sabotage the film, which Dave Kim starts working on after receiving a grant from the university. Meanwhile, Adam's former guidance counselor Mr. Perrott has developed feelings for Beverly and convinces her to go to dinner with him. Barry does not think Beverly is ready to date, while Erica does, and they both try to influence the date's outcome.
220	13	"Moms Need Other Moms"	Nicole Treston Abranian	Aaron Kaczander	February 15, 2023	1013	2.26
Erica meets another young mom, Lauren, and she and Beverly clash because Lauren believes some of Beverly' parenting methods to be dated. Adam and Barry try to make a children's educational video in the vein of Slim Goodbody.
221	14	"Two-Timing Goldbergs"	Nicole Treston Abranian	Andrew Secunda	February 22, 2023	1014	2.42
There is some confusion between Adam and Carmen over the exclusivity of their relationship after Beverly spots Carmen on a date with another guy, much to Adam's dismay because he wants to be exclusive with her. Erica's longtime best friend and Barry's ex, Lainey, visits town and Erica and Geoff become convinced that Barry is cheating on Geoff's sister, Joanne, with Lainey. In reality, Barry has been watching sports broadcasts on television with Lainey's dad, Bill, as they both used to do with Murray, and they hid the fact because they were worried bout how others would perceive the new development.
222	15	"The Crush"	Christine Lakin	Alison Wong	March 1, 2023	1015	2.27
At Erica's prodding, Beverly admits to having a crush on Mr. Perott. Roles are reversed when Mr. Perott asks another faculty member to chaperone a school dance with him, leaving Erica to console mom while strategizing with her to win Mr. Perott's heart. Meanwhile, Barry signs a lease for a rundown apartment without consulting Joanne, then tries to backtrack and takes her to the apartment, pretending that they are looking at it for the first time. Featured Song: "The Flame" by Cheap Trick
223	16	"The Better Annie"	Christine Lakin	Elizabeth Beckwith	March 8, 2023	1016	2.46
Adam introduces Carmen to his family and discovers Erica is still bitter about a past incident where Carmen got the lead role over her in a local performance of "Annie". Meanwhile, Pop-Pop's apartment has been repaired and he's free to return home, but wanting to stay with the Goldbergs instead, he asks Geoff to help make him a nicer person. Featured Song: "Waiting for a Star to Fall" by Boy Meets Girl
224	17	"A Flyer's Path to Victory"	Lea Thompson	Vanessa McCarthy	March 15, 2023	1017	2.46
With the Flyers in the Stanley Cup Finals, superstitious Barry makes demands but is forced to make a tough decision when the furniture store plans to offer full refunds (and bankrupt the business) if the Flyers win. Meanwhile, Erica and Geoff want his parents to spend more time with Muriel. Featured Song: “The Promise" by When in Rome Note: The date at the beginning of the episode is announced as "spring" instead of "March 15th".
225	18	"Love Shack"	Lea Thompson	Andrew Secunda	April 5, 2023	1018	2.28
With Pop-Pop deciding to stay in the Goldberg home, Barry and Joanne move into his unused apartment. When Adam helps them clean out a room of old junk, he discovers an unfinished science fiction novel that Pop-Pop wrote. Meanwhile, Erica and Geoff are finding so little time for themselves, they start using Pop-Pop's old apartment for romantic getaways. Featured Song: “In Between Days" by The Cure Note: The date at the beginning of the episode is announced as "March 22nd" instead of the expected "April 5th".
226	19	"Flowers for Barry"	Melissa Kosar	David Guarascio	April 12, 2023	1019	2.15
Stressed out by school and his relationship, Barry finds relaxation in an unlikely place helping Ginzy at Kremp Florist while Charles is away on a business trip. Meanwhile, Beverly finds she has nothing in common with Mr. Perott but pretends to like the same things he does. Featured Song: “And She Was" by Talking Heads Guest Starring: Chad Kremp as Charles Kremp
227	20	"Uptown Boy"	Lew Schneider	Peter Dirksen & Jonathan Howard	April 19, 2023	1020	2.39
Adam meets Carmen's auto mechanic father for the first time and is inspired to recreate Billy Joel's "Uptown Girl" video after seeing it on TV, but with the roles reversed. Meanwhile, Erica is inspired by "Baby Boom" and attempts to start a baby food company, not realizing Beverly's "homemade" recipes are just repackaged store-bought Gerber. Featured Song: “Uptown Girl" by Billy Joel Note: The date at the beginning of the episode is announced as "April 5th" instead of the expected "April 19th".
228	21	"Push It"	Lew Schneider	Chris Bishop & Alex Barnow	April 26, 2023	1021	2.07
With Adam heading to NYU in the fall, Beverly suggests he convince Carmen to go with him to New York, but when she refuses and Adam reacts to his mother interfering with his relationship again, Beverly contacts ex-girlfriends Dana, Jackie and Brea Bee to get their feedback. All three tell horror stories of Bev's meddling, making her take a hard look at how she's always smothered Adam. Meanwhile, Barry and JTP see Matt Bradley at an Eagles game with co-workers, and after Barry finds out his friends have acquaintances outside their group, he attempts to get new friends and form a new group. Featured Song: “Follow You Follow Me" by Genesis Note: The date at the beginning of the episode is announced as "football Sunday" instead of "April 26th".
229	22	"Bev to the Future"	Melissa Kosar	Mike Sikowitz	May 3, 2023	1022	2.54
Beverly feels weird going to her class reunion without Murray and brings Adam to accompany her, and while there, she reunites with former boyfriend George Myerson (Rob Corddry), much to the dismay of an interfering Adam, who believes she's trying to replace Murray. Meanwhile, Barry and Joanne, feeling frustrated that none of their family or friends take them or their relationship seriously, run off to elope prior to Muriel's first birthday party, and after Muriel utters her first word, "Bubbie", they hold off sharing their news until later. At the party, Adam is seen with his camcorder one last time, and various scenes from the series' 10-year run are shown. When Beverly finds out Barry's surprise news, she yells at him as Adam drives off with Carmen down the familiar neighborhood street in Pop-Pop's DMC DeLorean in the final scene. Featured Song: “Time for Me to Fly" by REO Speedwagon Notes: The date at the beginning of the episode is announced as "1980-something".; The episode contains multiple references to Back to the Future.; The episode is dedicated to "a decade of the Goldbergs", with then-and-now shots of Beverly, Erica, Barry and Adam followed by a scene of the four hugging, and the series concludes with a clip of Pops saying "I'm gonna miss you guys!"

== Ratings ==
Viewership and ratings per episode of The Goldbergs season 10
No.	Title	Air date	Rating/share (18–49)	Viewers (millions)	DVR (18–49)	DVR viewers (millions)	Total (18–49)	Total viewers (millions)
1	"If You Build It"	September 21, 2022	0.4	2.53	0.2	0.91	0.6	3.44
2	"That's a Schwartz Man"	September 28, 2022	0.4	2.14	0.2	0.86	0.6	3.01
3	"Jenkintown After Dark"	October 5, 2022	0.4	2.25	0.2	0.79	0.6	3.04
4	"Man of the House"	October 12, 2022	0.3	2.40	0.2	0.66	0.5	3.05
5	"Uncle-ing"	October 19, 2022	0.4	2.32	0.2	0.76	0.6	3.08
6	"DKNY"	October 26, 2022	0.4	2.58	0.2	0.59	0.6	3.17
7	"Rhinestones and Roses"	November 2, 2022	0.4	2.54	0.2	0.78	0.6	3.35
8	"Another Turkey in the Trot"	November 16, 2022	0.4	2.64	0.2	0.72	0.6	3.36
9	"Million Dollar Reward"	November 30, 2022	0.4	2.52	—N/a	—N/a	—N/a	—N/a
10	"Worst Grinch Ever"	December 7, 2022	0.4	2.51	—N/a	—N/a	—N/a	—N/a
11	"Blade Runner: The Musical"	January 11, 2023	0.4	2.63	0.2	0.68	0.6	3.31
12	"Amadoofus"	January 18, 2023	0.4	2.69	0.1	0.70	0.5	3.38
13	"Moms Need Other Moms"	February 15, 2023	0.3	2.26	—N/a	—N/a	—N/a	—N/a
14	"Two-Timing Goldbergs"	February 22, 2023	0.4	2.42	—N/a	—N/a	—N/a	—N/a
15	"The Crush"	March 1, 2023	0.3	2.27	—N/a	—N/a	—N/a	—N/a
16	"The Better Annie"	March 8, 2023	0.3	2.46	—N/a	—N/a	—N/a	—N/a
17	"A Flyer's Path to Victory"	March 15, 2023	0.4	2.46	—N/a	—N/a	—N/a	—N/a
18	"Love Shack"	April 5, 2023	0.3	2.28	—N/a	—N/a	—N/a	—N/a
19	"Flowers for Berry"	April 12, 2023	0.3	2.15	—N/a	—N/a	—N/a	—N/a
20	"Uptown Boy"	April 19, 2023	0.4	2.39	—N/a	—N/a	—N/a	—N/a
21	"Push It"	April 26, 2023	0.3	2.06	—N/a	—N/a	—N/a	—N/a
22	"Bev to the Future"	May 3, 2023	0.3	2.54	—N/a	—N/a	—N/a	—N/a
