= The Goldbergs season 8 =

Season of television series

The Goldbergs
- Season 8
- Promotional poster
- Starring: Wendi McLendon-Covey; Sean Giambrone; Troy Gentile; Hayley Orrantia; George Segal; Jeff Garlin; Sam Lerner
- No. of episodes: 22

Release
- Original network: ABC
- Original release: October 21, 2020 – May 19, 2021

Season chronology
- ← Previous; Season 7 Next → Season 9

The eighth season of the American television comedy series The Goldbergs premiered with two back-to-back episodes on October 21, 2020. This is the final season with George Segal, who died on March 23, 2021.

In May 2021, the series was renewed for a ninth season.

== Plot ==
Adam is now a senior at William Penn and is still dating Brea Bee, but their teenage relationship will have its ups and downs, and with the always-interfering Beverly wanting to spend even more time with him, she takes a job at the school as the semi-retired and outdated "Quaker Warden". Barry's time with Ren comes to an end but he finds new love unexpectedly with Geoff's sister Joanne after a relationship that started out as a joke becomes serious. After originally deciding to join Barry in becoming a doctor, Erica changes paths and pursues law instead, and she goes through some rough patches with Geoff, who is now a freshman at the school. The two break up for a while and Erica considers a move to Los Angeles to reunite with Lainey before ultimately deciding to get back together with Geoff instead, and the season ends with Geoff proposing to Erica at the Goldberg family's Jersey shore house.

== Cast ==
=== Main cast ===
- Wendi McLendon-Covey as Beverly Goldberg
- Sean Giambrone as Adam Goldberg
- Troy Gentile as Barry Goldberg
- Hayley Orrantia as Erica Goldberg
- Sam Lerner as Geoff Schwartz
- George Segal as Albert "Pops" Solomon
- Jeff Garlin as Murray Goldberg

=== Recurring cast ===
- Carrie Wampler as Ren
- Matt Bush as Andy Cogan
- Noah Munck as Naked Rob
- Shayne Topp as Matt Bradley
- Sadie Stanley as Brea Bee
- David Koechner as Bill Lewis
- Jessica St. Clair as Dolores
- Stephen Tobolowsky as Principal Earl Ball
- Dan Bakkedahl as Mr. Woodburn
- Steve Guttenberg as Dr. Katman
- Jennifer Irwin as Virginia "Ginzy" Kremp
- Mindy Sterling as Linda Schwartz
- Stephanie Courtney as Essie Karp
- Erinn Hayes as Jane Bales
- Judd Hirsch as Ben "Pop Pop" Goldberg
- Richard Kind as Michael "Formica Mike" Mikowitz
- Cedric Yarbrough as Vic
- Beth Triffon as Joanne Schwartz

=== Guest cast ===
- AJ Michalka as Lainey Lewis

== Episodes ==
| No. overall | No. in season | Title | Directed by | Written by | Original release date | Prod. code | U.S. viewers (millions) |
|---|---|---|---|---|---|---|---|
| 164 | 1 | "Airplane!" | Eric Dean Seaton | David Guarascio | October 21, 2020 | 801 | 4.13 |
A week before school starts again, Beverly makes a huge announcement to the family - she is flying them all to Miami for a family vacation! Geoff, Brea, and Ren are also invited to join the trip. While at the airport, however, Beverly tells Murray a huge secret: they are really flying to Miami for a Bar Mitzvah in the family, but doesn't want to tell the kids because she knows they will get mad at her. Barry and Ren try to get first-class seating after Barry finds out how rich Ren's parents are, but with two open seats available costing $5,000, it is actually Adam and Brea who get upgraded to first-class. Beverly subsequently reveals the secret to Geoff, who in turn tells Erica after she pressures him. On the plane, Erica, Barry, and Adam all chew out their mother and the plane is forced to take an emergency detour in Atlanta after Murray gets stuck in the lavatory. Beverly tells the kids that she is upset they keep skipping important family events and tricking them into going to Miami was the only way they would attend this Bar Mitzvah. The family later gets back on the plane and head to Miami, where they enjoy a good time. Meanwhile, Adam's nonstop jokes about the movie Airplane! annoy Brea, who keeps wanting to talk to Adam about something important. It is revealed that Brea wears headgear. Featured Song: "Conga" by Miami Sound Machine
| 165 | 2 | "The Prettiest Boy in School" | Lew Schneider | Matt Roller | October 21, 2020 | 802 | 4.13 |
Adam shows up for his senior year in school with contact lenses, a healthier complexion, new hairstyle, and the popular Brea on his arm. This endears him to the jocks and other popular kids but, to Adam’s dismay, makes him an outcast among his old nerd group. Adam makes multiple efforts to bring the two groups together, with all backfiring, until Glascott assures him there are so many things he can be that don’t align with either the jocks or the nerds. At home, Beverly enjoys smothering Erica and Barry for the last couple weeks before they return to college, until she sees how Ginzy Kremp’s kids treat her with respect and Bev realizes her children are taking advantage of her. Featured Song: "Someday, Someway" by Marshall Crenshaw
| 166 | 3 | "It's All About Comptrol" | Lew Schneider | Mike Sikowitz | October 28, 2020 | 803 | 3.66 |
After a campaign visit from the candidate for Jenkintown Comptroller (Adhir Kalyan), who is running unopposed, Beverly decides she will run against him even though she has no idea what the position entails. She enlists Adam and the local yentas to run her campaign, which is a mass of fluff and lies. Pops asks Murray why he isn’t stopping Bev from her self-sabotage, with Murray replying he’s grown tired of his wife’s constant attempts to reinvent herself. As Erica and Barry return to college, Barry excites Geoff by discussing all the fun on-campus events for incoming freshmen, only for Geoff to learn that Erica has secured a place for them well off-campus. After Geoff constantly shows up late for events due to the commute, he breaks the news to Erica that he’d rather live on-campus with Barry. Featured Songs: "Control" by Janet Jackson, "Roll with the Changes" by REO Speedwagon
| 167 | 4 | "Bill's Wedding" | Christine Lakin | Teleplay by : Alex Barnow & Chris Bishop; Story by : Mike Sikowitz | November 4, 2020 | 804 | 3.78 |
Beverly interrupts the courthouse nuptials of Bill Lewis and his fiancée Dolores, convincing them she can plan a real wedding for them despite it having to be done in 24 hours so they can leave for their honeymoon in Tahiti. Bev enlists family and friends alike, but things quickly go awry, forcing her to begrudgingly ask her nemesis Jane Bales for help. Meanwhile, local psychic Karen English tells the Goldberg children that on the day of the wedding, a relationship for one couple will end. After seeing signs that both Adam’s and Erica’s significant others may drop the bomb on them, Barry thinks he and Ren are solid. However, he later learns that Ren reconnected with her old boyfriend and realized she still has feelings for him. On the wedding day, Bill gets cold feet due to fears that this marriage might end as badly as his first one did, but Murray talks him down by sharing how wonderful his marriage to Bev is. Bev overhears Murray, and smiles widely through her tears. Featured Song: "Maybe I'm Amazed" by Paul McCartney, covered by Hayley Orrantia Note: This episode was originally intended to be the 24th episode of season 7 but was postponed due to the COVID-19 pandemic.
| 168 | 5 | "Dee-Vorced" | Lew Schneider | Teleplay by : Bill Callahan; Story by : Bill Callahan & Adam F. Goldberg | November 18, 2020 | 805 | 3.72 |
Beverly becomes concerned when she secretly reads letters that Adam and Brea are writing to each other (the result of Murray angrily removing every phone in the house), especially when they bring up being married in the future. Bev shares her concerns with Vicki Bee, Brea's mother, and is taken aback to learn that Vicki is divorced. Thinking Brea, being a child of divorce, will hurt her schmoo if they get married, Bev sets out to sabotage the kids' relationship. Meanwhile, a newly-single Barry wants to reconnect with his JTP pals, only to learn that every one of them has a girlfriend and is too busy to partake in his proposed shenanigans. He leaves a series of fake breakup messages with each friend, but the JTP are wise to his schemes. Featured Song: "Head over Heels" by The Go-Go's Note: The real Brea Bee appears in the episode as Brea's mother Vicki.
| 169 | 6 | "Eracism" | Eric Dean Seaton | Peter Dirksen & Jonathan Howard | November 25, 2020 | 807 | 3.67 |
After Adam watches Spike Lee's Do the Right Thing, he gets a new perspective on racism, but thinks it's only confined to Brooklyn. Classmates Dave Kim and African American Brian Walls assure him that racism is prevalent in their own school, so Adam wants to do something about it. Glascott convinces him to make a film, but when the film's story completely misses the point, Adam realizes how sheltered his life has been. Elsewhere, Geoff is shocked when Erica backs into another car, but she and Barry refuse to leave a note. He returns to the car later to leave a note, only to have the car's owner pull an injury scam. This makes Geoff question his ultra-honest approach to life. Featured Song:: "Don't Dream It's Over" by Crowded House
| 170 | 7 | "Hanukkah on the Seas" | Jason Blount | Annie Mebane | December 2, 2020 | 806 | 3.94 |
Murray's father Ben ("Pop Pop") says he's booked a cruise for the family for Hanukkah. When he says it's a cruise to "St. John's", the family assumes the ship is going to St. John in the Virgin Islands, and dresses accordingly. When they board, they learn they are on a cut-rate cruise to St. John's, Newfoundland and Labrador. Murray learns his father only booked the cruise to ask for money, including money to pay for the cruise itself. He later learns that Ben is worried about taking care of himself, and thinks he will need to pay for nursing assistance soon. Meanwhile, Barry, still reeling from his breakup with Ren, plans to find a new love on board the ship. He's disappointed when the young activities director seems to take a shine to Adam instead. In reality, the woman thinks Adam is younger than he is, and would be interested in some of the children's games. Adam lies to a dejected Barry, saying the director was only using himself to get to Barry. He then tells Barry that any romance with the director would only last the duration of the cruise, but assures him that he can be confident in finding love again. Meanwhile, Erica spends Hanukkah with Geoff's family, and learns they aren't nearly as perfect as she thought. Featured Song: "Your Song" by Elton John, covered by Hayley Orrantia
| 171 | 8 | "Bevy's Big Murder Mystery Party" | Lew Schneider | Aaron Kaczander | January 13, 2021 | 808 | 3.83 |
After watching the film Clue with Adam, Beverly invites the neighborhood for a murder mystery dinner party, with Adam serving as butler/host. Murray reluctantly agrees to be the dead body, but he gets impatient and reveals the who, with what and where, ruining the mystery. As the guests prepare to leave, Bill Lewis has an allergic reaction to eating a mushroom cap with crab meat in it, while Ginzy Kremp notices her coat has been bedazzled. The guests suspect Bev engineered the latest "crimes" as a way to keep people from leaving, but the culprit turns out to be someone else. Elsewhere, Erica learns from her counselor that she's running out of time to declare a major. She briefly considers going into medicine like Barry, but a bad experience with a cadaver foot in anatomy class steers her away. Her reaction to the foot and subsequent fight with Barry gets both thrown out of the class. Erica later makes a case to the professor that she alone was at fault, and that Barry deserves a second chance. Barry is so impressed by how his sister handled the negotiation, he suggests that Erica would make a good lawyer. Featured Song: "Whole Wide World" by Wreckless Eric
| 172 | 9 | "Cocoon" | Christine Lakin | Elizabeth Beckwith | January 27, 2021 | 809 | 3.37 |
When Pops falls asleep during the movie Cocoon, which ironically is about elderly people recapturing their youth, Adam worries that his best friend no longer has the energy to enjoy life. After seeing Barry, Andy and Naked Rob taking a bodybuilding powder and displaying unusual pep, Adam thinks it might work for Pops. He asks Dr. Katz if the powder is safe. Katz says the ingredients will do no harm, but are basically useless, then explains the placebo effect to Adam. Nevertheless, Adam gives Pops some of the powder, and Pops responds with a rush of activity. Adam then worries that a renewed Pops may hurt himself, and he does suffer minor injuries when slipping off the high dive at his retirement community pool. Meanwhile, Bev is power suit shopping for Erica after learning she's going into pre-law, when she spots her cookbook in a bargain bin with a 99-cent price sticker. Annoyed, she confronts the publisher, who admits he stopped printing the book short of the 10,000 copies agreed upon in their contract. He then produces an addendum that Beverly appears to have signed, which states he has the right to cease printing at any time. Although first annoyed by Bev's request that she use her new "lawyering skills", Erica (with Murray's unwitting help) is able to produce evidence that the addendum was forged. Featured Song: "Handle with Care" by Traveling Wilburys
| 173 | 10 | "Geoff's New Hat" | Lew Schneider | Langan Kingsley | February 3, 2021 | 810 | 3.24 |
While shopping with Erica, Geoff decides to update his look with a new ivy-style cap, which gets him some attention on campus but earns the ire of Barry. Barry is also against Andy and Naked Rob making new fashion choices. Barry asks Erica to update his wardrobe with something awful so he can stick it to his JTP pals, but Erica's preppy outfit actually has the reverse effect. It turns out Barry's concerns over change is because Matt Bradley is out of town for work, and he fears the JTP will all be splitting up and going their separate ways soon. Meanwhile at home, Beverly tries to organize a game of Pictionary with Bill, Dolores, Adam and Brea, but Murray wants to watch TV rather than play the game. This irritates Bev as she sees Bill and Dolores being so passionate with each other. To win back Bev's affections, Murray installs a hot tub in the basement, but still wants to watch the basement TV while Bev uses it, making her even angrier. Murray finally joins the group for Pictionary, and sees that he and Bev make an excellent team because they know each other so well, unlike newlyweds Bill and Dolores who are still learning. Featured Song: "Give a Little Bit" by Supertramp
| 174 | 11 | "Quaker Warden" | Vern Davidson | Erik Weiner | February 10, 2021 | 811 | 3.31 |
With 68 days left in the school year, Beverly looks for any role she can fill at William Penn to be sure she spends those days close to Adam. As luck would have it, a teacher leaves to deliver her baby, providing Bev an opportunity to substitute teach. Adam inadvertently lets Beverly know about senior skip day. Bev confronts Ball and a few teachers, who are fully aware of the skip day and are actually looking forward to it. Desperate to make sure Bev doesn't mess up their plans, Ball assigns her the job of Quaker Warden, a position that is on the books but hasn't been filled in 75 years because it involves enforcing outdated Quaker principles. Of course, Bev takes the job seriously, much to the consternation of Adam, his classmates and the staff. Elsewhere, Murray has become frustrated at work due to his partner, Formica Mike, constantly forcing him to go along with his product ideas and never listening to Murray's feedback. He gets advice from Geoff that would have him appeal to Mike's kind, reasoning side, but that backfires, forcing Murray to consider Barry's more vengeful tactics. Featured Song: "Hold On Loosely" by 38 Special
| 175 | 12 | "The Lasagna You Deserve" | Eric Dean Seaton | Mike Sikowitz | February 24, 2021 | 812 | 3.72 |
After seeing Adam accept a dry, overcooked corner piece of lasagna at school and being a pushover in many other ways, Beverly is determined to teach him the Goldberg method of getting not just what he deserves, but more. Erica and Barry, who have clearly learned from their mother, pitch in to help. While it works at school and his favorite video store, Adam soon sees how his new, demanding self affects other people, and decides it's not for him. Meanwhile, when Vic abandons his non-conversational work lunch with Murray to go out for lunch with Formica Mike, Murray starts to realize how inattentive he's been to his long-time employee and friend. This causes Murray to seek advice from Barry on how to be a real friend, but Barry's advice only backfires and makes Vic even more upset at Murray. In the end, using one of his own tactics, Murray eventually shows Vic that he really does care about him, even if he doesn't always show it. Featured Song: "Theme from The Greatest American Hero (Believe It or Not)" by Joey Scarbury
| 176 | 13 | "Mr. Ships Ahoy" | Lew Schneider | Matt Roller | March 3, 2021 | 813 | 3.50 |
Barry and Geoff see a booth on campus for the college's annual male-only pageant known as Mr. Ships Ahoy, and both decide to enter. When they see that Albert Solomon (Pops) won the contest in the 1940s, Geoff seeks out his advice, but Pops' suggestions on impressing the female judges are very dated. Barry and Geoff later size up their competitors, which are all buff, handsome young men, and begin to panic. But Erica has a trick up her sleeve to help Geoff win. Meanwhile, Beverly tries to get the William Penn faculty to bond more as friends, but there seems to be a lack of interest. She forces them to attend her party, which backfires and embarrasses Adam. Adam later helps the faculty see that Beverly can be an asset if they just give her a chance. Featured Song: "9 to 5" by Dolly Parton
| 177 | 14 | "Love Triangle" | Jay Chandrasekhar | David Guarascio | March 24, 2021 | 814 | 3.42 |
As Brea heads to visit her cousin at the University of Virginia, Beverly warns Adam that it will not end well for their relationship. She convinces him to do a grand gesture to prevent Brea from choosing UVA as her college. Adam is game until an unexpected intervention by Murray stops him from making a fool of himself. Murray had correctly deduced Beverly was only acting on her own insecurity about Adam going away to NYU in the fall. Meanwhile, Geoff gets tickets to attend a taping of his and Barry's favorite local talk show, hosted by Nancy Glass, but irks his friend by asking Erica to attend. A vengeful Barry gets Geoff's sister Joanne to agree to a fake relationship in order to change her brother's mind. Featured Song: "Islands in the Stream" by Dolly Parton and Kenny Rogers Note: This is the first episode to air after the death of George Segal and features a short "In Memoriam" still in his honor after the credits.
| 178 | 15 | "Bever-lé" | Lew Schneider | Bill Callahan | March 31, 2021 | 815 | 3.20 |
When the NFL players go on strike and the football season is threatened, Barry gets concerned that he and Murray will no longer have anything to talk about. This leads Barry to try out for the Eagles upon learning that the league will be fielding replacement players, with Murray teaching him his long-snapping skills. After being embarrassed by Jane Bales while clothes shopping with Erica, Beverly decides to join her rival in becoming financially independent by selling cosmetic products and weight loss supplements from a sketchy company. Featured Song: "Everywhere" by Fleetwood Mac
| 179 | 16 | "Couple Off" | Lea Thompson | Annie Mebane | April 7, 2021 | 816 | 3.37 |
After Brea implies that she and Adam have completely different lives, Adam gets a job at the ice cream store where Brea works to prove he isn't as spoiled as she thinks he is. Realizing that an actual job does take a lot of work, Adam tells Beverly, who chews out the manager so Adam will get fired, which is successful. However, after both Brea and Pops express disappointment in Adam, he convinces the manager to rehire him so he can learn what it's like to live in Brea's world. Meanwhile, when new couple Barry and Joanne tag along to Erica and Geoff's camping trip, the two have little competitions to see who is the better couple. However, while Barry and Joanne seem to get every answer right, it turns out Erica and Geoff don't know each other as well as they thought. After she sees Geoff working on a school paper during the trip, Erica realizes how much he sacrifices for her and suggests they take a break from their relationship so Geoff can find himself. However, Geoff misinterprets Erica's message, and they break up at the end of the episode. Featured Song: "Take On Me" by A-ha and Gustavo Steiner. Note: This episode marks the final appearance of George Segal as Pops. Segal passed away on March 23, 2021, and this episode is dedicated to him.
| 180 | 17 | "Who's Afraid of Brea Bee?" | Lew Schneider | Peter Dirksen & Jonathan Howard | April 14, 2021 | 817 | 3.28 |
Following Geoff and Erica's break-up, Beverly has trouble accepting that the two aren't together anymore. She not only goes to great lengths to get the two back together but also involves herself in Barry and Joanne's relationship in order to make sure they stay together. Meanwhile, Adam recruits Brea to the upcoming school play production of Who's Afraid of Virginia Woolf? when they are short on actors, but he's filled with jealousy when he notices how good of an actress Brea is. When Adam gets recast in a smaller role, he intentionally sabotages the opening night of the play to regain the spotlight, resulting in Adam being cast out of the play and making Brea angry at him. Featured Song: "Heart of Glass" by Blondie, covered by Hayley Orrantia
| 181 | 18 | "The Dating Game" | Ryan Krayser | Vicky Castro | April 21, 2021 | 818 | 3.30 |
Not wanting to see Erica and Geoff stay miserable for much longer, Barry and Joanne try to make the two just be friends while setting them up on separate dates. Barry and the JTP convince Geoff to go on The Dating Game, while Joanne sets up Erica with a waiter. After Erica and Geoff bump into each other with their dates at a restaurant and make things worse between them, Barry suggests to Erica that she and Geoff stay out of each other's lives for a while. Meanwhile, Murray lands a huge check from work and uses it to buy a house at the shore, knowing it's something Beverly always wanted. However, after Beverly sees it for the first time, she is less than thrilled because it needs a lot of repairs. Beverly gets Bill Lewis, a contractor, to visit the house and convince Murray the repairs will be too costly, while Beverly tries to hide her motives. Murray later finds out how Beverly really feels when Jane Bales drives by and embarrasses her. While Adam enjoys a day at the beach, Beverly sees how excited Murray was about pleasing her, and agrees they can fix up the house and make it work. Featured Song: "All Through the Night" by Cyndi Lauper
| 182 | 19 | "Daddy Daughter Day 2" | Mary Lambert | Aaron Kaczander & Erik Weiner | April 28, 2021 | 819 | 3.12 |
After Erica gets upset when Geoff returns a voucher they had saved for their fifth-anniversary dinner, Murray takes Erica out for a daddy-daughter day and they use Geoff's voucher for their own dinner, but cheering up Erica is easier said than done. Afterward, the two go roller skating, where they run into Johnny Atkins and Carla Mann, both of whom seem excited to tell friends that a great guy like Geoff is back on the market. Meanwhile, after Adam's friends use him in an attempt to pull a senior prank, he tricks Beverly into giving him the keys to the school so he can pull a prank of his own: vandalizing the William Penn statue. However, the prank quickly turns sour when he both hurts Beverly's feelings and inadvertently damages Mr. Perott's motorcycle. Featured Song: "More Than This" by Roxy Music
| 183 | 20 | "Poker Night" | Lew Schneider | Langan Kingsley & Elizabeth Beckwith | May 5, 2021 | 820 | 2.85 |
Adam and Dave Kim are invited to a poker night by two popular kids, but Beverly learns of it and intervenes to thwart the event. She and Murray punish Adam by making him help Pop Pop with some tasks at his home. While there, Adam learns of Pop Pop's love of poker, and calls the guys to relocate the game there, with Pop Pop and Barry joining them, only to be caught by Beverly again when she brings food. Beverly was upset and threatened to punish Adam for disobeying her. She cooled off for a minute after hearing pop-pop side of the story and Adam is old enough to make his own mistakes and Adam did nothing wrong and let them play poker. Elsewhere, Erica decides to visit Lainey in Los Angeles during spring break, mainly to get as far away from Geoff as possible. Lainey has exaggerated her music success, and confesses to Erica that she's broke. While Erica helps Lainey sing at a child's birthday party, they manage to get a Monday night gig at the Roxy that could be Lainey's big break. Erica thinks it's destiny telling her she should move to L.A. However, Erica runs into Geoff, who is with his father at an optometry conference, causing her to ruin the gig with Lainey by constantly getting distracted looking for Geoff in the crowd. Lainey tells Erica she needs to return home and resolve things with Geoff rather than move to California. Featured Songs: "Destination Unknown" by Missing Persons, "I Love L.A." by Randy Newman, covered by Hayley Orrantia and AJ Michalka Guest Starring: AJ Michalka as Lainey Lewis
| 184 | 21 | "Alligator Schwartz" | Nicole Treston Abranian | Dan Bailey | May 12, 2021 | 821 | 3.02 |
Prodded by Beverly, Erica decides to talk with Geoff about her lingering feelings, but Barry, who has become obsessed with Paul Hogan's Crocodile Dundee, lies to Erica and says Geoff is dating a girl named Paula Hogan. After a series of near-misses with Geoff, Erica finds that there really is someone named Paula Hogan on campus, and confronts her. Paula's confusion leads Erica and Beverly to confront Geoff, but their encounter only serves to confirm Geoff has moved on. Geoff eventually goes to the Goldberg home to tell Erica the truth: he has taken her advice to learn what he really wants in life, and number one on the list is Erica, and they get back together. Elsewhere, Adam is conflicted when Dave Kim has two tickets for a new theme park and assumes Adam will go with him, even though it's the same day as the prom. Torn between letting down Brea or his best friend, Adam manages to get a cheerleader whose boyfriend is out of town to take Dave to prom. However, when Dave rubs his date in Adam's face, Adam explodes and admits he paid the cheerleader to be his date, which both upsets Dave and causes Brea to break off her prom date with Adam. After receiving advice from Murray on what to do, Adam ends up taking Dave to prom with him. Featured Song: "Modern Love" by David Bowie
| 185 | 22 | "The Proposal" | Lew Schneider | Alex Barnow & Chris Bishop | May 19, 2021 | 822 | 3.07 |
Geoff tells the JTP that he is planning on taking Erica to the Goldbergs' shore house for the weekend in order to propose to her, and ultimately gives Barry the ring for safekeeping. Although Beverly sees the ring and understands Geoff's plan, several other miscommunications ensue. Joanne sees the ring in Barry's room and assumes Barry is planning to propose to her, so she tells her parents that she isn't ready to marry Barry, but they assume she's saying Erica isn't ready to marry Geoff. Lou and Linda subsequently tell Beverly, who tells Geoff, causing him to break off his plan to propose. Geoff, who had told Erica he has a big surprise for her (the proposal), instead invites a bunch of friends (the JTP, Johnny Atkins and Carla) over, and says that is the surprise. A disappointed Erica goes outside on the beach for a break from all the chaos. With the help of Adam and Brea, who have explained the real situation to the Goldberg and Schwartz families, as well as Bill, Vic, Ginzy, and Essie, everybody rushes to the shore house to clear up everything with Geoff, and give him the ring. At the end of the episode, he finally proposes to Erica, and she happily accepts. Featured Song: "Let My Love Open the Door (E. Cola Mix)" by Pete Townshend

== Ratings ==
Viewership and ratings per episode of The Goldbergs season 8
| No. | Title | Air date | Rating/share (18–49) | Viewers (millions) | DVR (18–49) | DVR viewers (millions) | Total (18–49) | Total viewers (millions) |
|---|---|---|---|---|---|---|---|---|
| 1 | "Airplane!" | October 21, 2020 | 0.8 | 4.13 | —N/a | —N/a | —N/a | —N/a |
| 2 | "The Prettiest Boy in School" | October 21, 2020 | 0.8 | 4.13 | —N/a | —N/a | —N/a | —N/a |
| 3 | "It's All About Comptrol" | October 28, 2020 | 0.7 | 3.66 | 0.3 | 0.96 | 1.0 | 4.65 |
| 4 | "Bill's Wedding" | November 4, 2020 | 0.8 | 3.78 | 0.3 | 0.94 | 1.1 | 4.72 |
| 5 | "Dee-Vorced" | November 18, 2020 | 0.7 | 3.72 | —N/a | —N/a | —N/a | —N/a |
| 6 | "Eracism" | November 25, 2020 | 0.7 | 3.67 | —N/a | —N/a | —N/a | —N/a |
| 7 | "Hanukkah On the Seas" | December 2, 2020 | 0.7 | 3.94 | —N/a | —N/a | —N/a | —N/a |
| 8 | "Bevy's Big Murder Mystery Party" | January 13, 2021 | 0.7 | 3.83 | —N/a | —N/a | —N/a | —N/a |
| 9 | "Cocoon" | January 27, 2021 | 0.6 | 3.37 | —N/a | —N/a | —N/a | —N/a |
| 10 | "Geoff's New Hat" | February 3, 2021 | 0.6 | 3.24 | —N/a | —N/a | —N/a | —N/a |
| 11 | "Quaker Warden" | February 10, 2021 | 0.6 | 3.31 | —N/a | —N/a | —N/a | —N/a |
| 12 | "The Lasagna You Deserve" | February 24, 2021 | 0.7 | 3.72 | —N/a | —N/a | —N/a | —N/a |
| 13 | "Mr. Ships Ahoy" | March 3, 2021 | 0.6 | 3.50 | —N/a | —N/a | —N/a | —N/a |
| 14 | "Love Triangle" | March 24, 2021 | 0.6 | 3.42 | —N/a | —N/a | —N/a | —N/a |
| 15 | "Bever-lé" | March 31, 2021 | 0.5 | 3.20 | —N/a | —N/a | —N/a | —N/a |
| 16 | "Couple Off" | April 7, 2021 | 0.6 | 3.37 | —N/a | —N/a | —N/a | —N/a |
| 17 | "Who's Afraid of Brea Bee?" | April 14, 2021 | 0.6 | 3.28 | —N/a | —N/a | —N/a | —N/a |
| 18 | "The Dating Game" | April 21, 2021 | 0.6 | 3.30 | —N/a | —N/a | —N/a | —N/a |
| 19 | "Daddy Daughter Day 2" | April 28, 2021 | 0.5 | 3.12 | —N/a | —N/a | —N/a | —N/a |
| 20 | "Poker Night" | May 5, 2021 | 0.5 | 2.85 | 0.2 | 0.70 | 0.7 | 3.54 |
| 21 | "Alligator Schwartz" | May 12, 2021 | 0.6 | 3.02 | 0.2 | 0.72 | 0.8 | 3.74 |
| 22 | "The Proposal" | May 19, 2021 | 0.6 | 3.07 | 0.2 | 0.74 | 0.8 | 3.80 |
