= Sabrina Brier =

American influencer and comedian (born 1994)

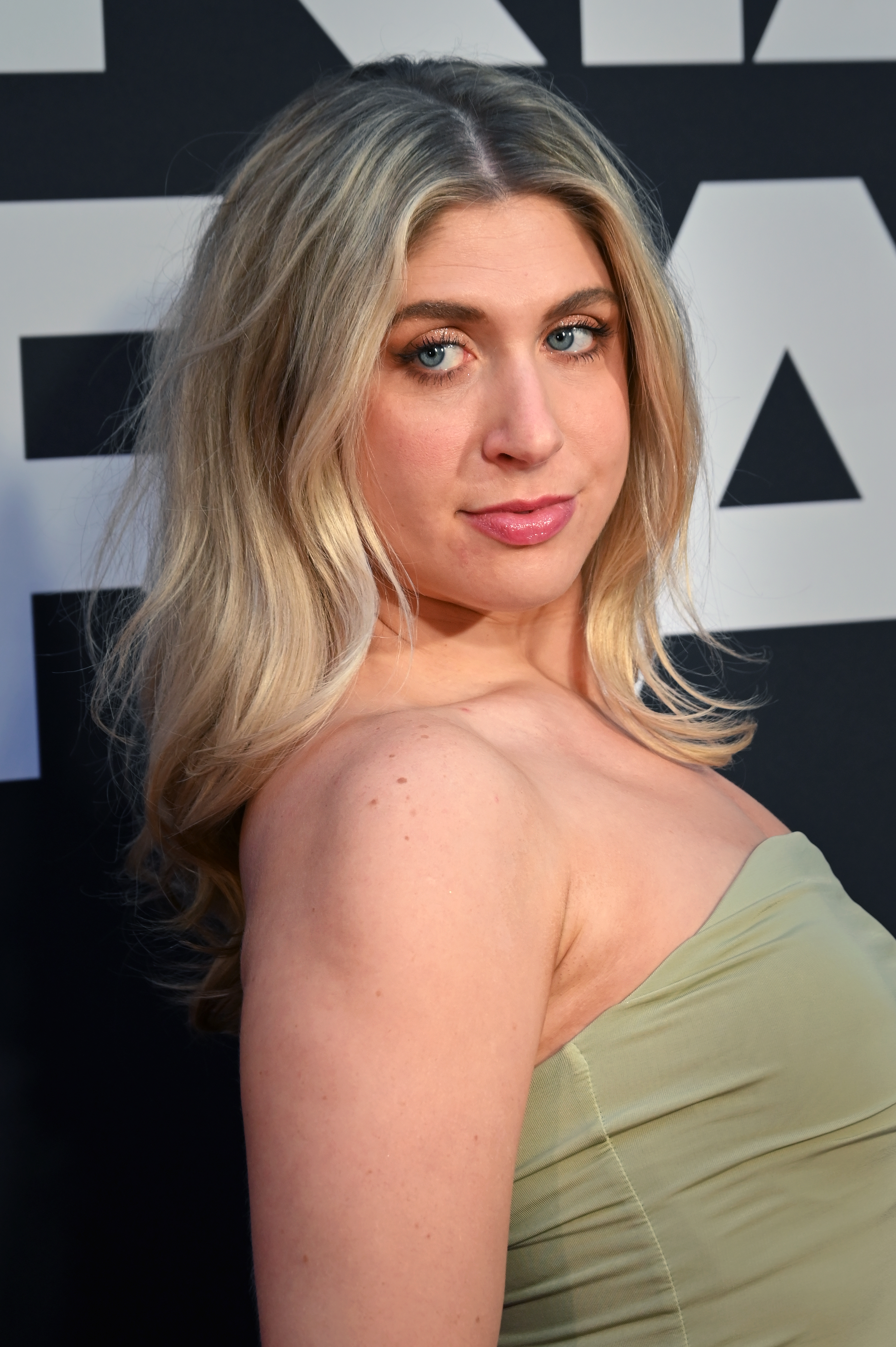
- Brier in 2025
- Born: August 4, 1994 (age 32)
- Education: Smith College (BA)
- Occupations: Actress; comedian; influencer
- Mother: Susan Cinoman

TikTok information
- Page: Sabrina Brier
- Followers: 862.3 K
- Last updated: August 10, 2025

Sabrina Plon Brier (born August 4, 1994) is an American influencer, comedian, and actress. Her TikTok videos skits featuring privileged and self-involved characters first became popular in 2023.

== Life and career ==
Brier was born on August 4, 1994, to Susan Cinoman, a playwright and former sketch comedian, and a cardiologist father. She is Jewish and has one older sister who works as a producer. Brier's parents divorced when she was five years old. She attended Amity Regional High School in Woodbridge, Connecticut and, while there, performed a monologue from The Taming of the Shrew for a Shakespeare competition in which she won first place. She then attended Smith College, where she majored in theater while taking improv classes. During college, she was an intern for the sixth season of the ABC political thriller series Scandal. She graduated in 2017 and soon moved to New York City. She worked in talent management for two years after graduating before working as an assistant for the writers of the ABC legal drama For Life.

Brier found success on TikTok, where she began posting in 2021, through posting skits in which she played privileged, self-involved characters, such as the "Extremely Passive Aggressive Roommate". By August 2023, she had gained more than 600 thousand followers. Brier had a guest role in the Steven Soderbergh web series Command Z, which was released in July 2023. As of 2023, she is represented by Creative Artists Agency. She appeared in a teaser video for the song "Planet of the Bass" by comedian Kyle Gordon as DJ Crazy Times on TikTok in August 2023. In October 2023, for The Guardian, JD Reforma wrote of Brier that she had "elevated the loyal-but-basic best friend archetype into something sublime". By 2024, videos of Brier saying "Oh!" became a popular reaction meme online, particularly on Twitter. In February 2024, she guest starred as Jessca, a substitute teacher, in "Smoking", an episode in season three of Abbott Elementary. By June 2024, Brier had over 800,000 followers on TikTok.

In January 2025, Brier released the audiobook, That Friend, about an influencer in New York City with an advice podcast whose life starts to fall apart, through Simon & Schuster.

== Filmography ==
=== Television ===
Year	Title	Role	Notes
2023	Command Z	Pura Shujaa	Episode: "The Climate II"
2024	Abbott Elementary	Jessca	Episode: "Smoking"
