= Susan Cinoman =

American dramatist

- Education: Temple University; Bryn Mawr College
- Occupations: Playwright; Screenwriter; Educator
- Years active: 1991-present
- Spouse: Doug Tenaglia
- Children: 2, including Sabrina Brier

Susan Cinoman (born 1960) is an American playwright and screenwriter from Philadelphia, Pennsylvania.

== Background ==
Cinoman attended Temple University where she studied theater and acting, and then Bryn Mawr College to study English. Aside from her work as a playwright, in early 2008 Cinoman was teaching English and drama at Middlebrook Middle School in Wilton, Connecticut, and by December 2008, she had become theater director at Woodland Regional High School in Beacon Falls, Connecticut. She would work there until June 2019 when she announced her retirement. She first began writing while at Temple University, with the comedy group The Soubrettes, created by herself, Michael Ladenson, Patrick Tranter, and Drucie McDaniel and co-starring Lennie Daniels and Jill Tarnoff.

She is a mother of two daughters and an animal advocate and horseback rider, as well as an active member of Woodland Worldwide, an international organization that seeks to create opportunities for young girls in impoverished circumstances.

== Career ==
=== Theater ===
Cinoman wrote her first play in 1991, and throughout the 1990s such theater companies produced her works as Ensemble Studio Theatre, The Miranda Theatre, Circle Repertory, Six Figures Theatre and Creative Voices Theatre.

Many of Cinoman's plays were directed by founder of the Actors Studio Jane Hoffman and Temple University theater professor Jan Silverman. Recently her play Beds was produced in Los Angeles by the 'Secret Rose Theatre' starring Paige Howard, and subsequently at Miami, Florida's nationally recognized summer play festival. Most recently Cinoman's play, "Love and Class in Connecticut" has been directed by Karen Lynn Carpenter, Interim Artistic Director of the William Inge Theatre Festival and director of Drama Desk winning play, "Love, Loss and What I Wore" by Nora Ephron. The play is being developed for a Broadway production currently led by Douglas Denoff (Nice Work if you Can Get It, Handle With Care.) Additionally, Cinoman's play "All Me, All the Time" has been directed by Barbara Bain of the Actors Studio in Los Angeles and Temple Beautiful, another play about the true story of 1970's dietary cult "Temple Beautiful" is set for a reading in Paris at The Moving Parts Theatre.

Her published plays include Fitting Rooms (included in The Best American Short Plays 1995-1996 published by Hal Leonard Corporation), and Little Sins and Truth and Sex (included in 25 in 10: twenty-five ten-minute plays published by Dramatic Publishing). Her play "Sweet Sand" was recently published by Next Stage Press.

Most recently, Cinoman's story, "Drama Mama", was featured on ABC-TV's The Goldbergs featuring herself (played by Ana Gasteyer), as the drama teacher of Adam F. Goldberg, the series' creator.

Cinoman's plays are published by Applause Books, Dramatic Publishing and Next Stage Press.

=== Screenwriter ===
Cinoman has written two independent films both directed by her husband, Doug Tenagalia. Her first film, adapted from one of her plays, Love and Class in Connecticut (2007), starring Joanna Keylock, Bill Phillips, Carole Schweid, Theresa Rose, and Steve Garbett, won 'Best Narrative' at the 'New England Film and Video Festival', and 'Judges'Choice for Best Connecticut Filmmaker' at the 'Connecticut Film Festival' of 2008, and was official selection at both the Berkshire International Film Festival Official Selection and the 'Somewhere North of Boston Film Festival'.

Her second film, All Me, All the Time (2007), starred John Augustine, Siri Baruc, Janine Barris, Sachi Parker, Keir Dullea and his real life wife, Mia Dillon.

=== Recognition ===
Of her 1994 evening of one acts, Cinoman and Rebeck, The New York Times wrote "Ms. Cinoman gets the evening off to an intriguing start with The Bull, a mordant twist on the bullring's classic dance of seduction and death," and made note of her additional offerings, The Sineater of Cork, Hysteria, and Truth and Sex, noting that "Like many such collections, this one has shortcomings as well as talent and promise."

=== Awards and nominations ===
Cinoman won an Aristos Award in 2009, given for objectivity in arts criticism, scholarship, or commentary, for a comment she made on the weblog "Community Perspectives: Riffing with John Clinton Eisner". Maxwell Anderson Playwright Award Theatre Ariel Women in Playwrighting Award Publication: Fitting Rooms Applause Book; Best Plays 1995096, 25 in 10, "Truth and Sex", "Little Sins", Dramatic Publishing, Etens, "The Bull", 2019 Guilford Prize in Drama Ellie Award in Playwrighting, Ivoryton Playhouse Connecticut Literary Journal
