= Alex Barnow =

American television producer and writer

Alex Barnow is an American television producer and writer. He is one of the co-creators of the American television sitcom Mr. Sunshine, which he created with Matthew Perry and his partner, Marc Finek. He also worked as a writer/producer for television programs including The Goldbergs, Rules of Engagement, 'Til Death, Out of Practice and Family Guy.

In 2019, Barnow became a showrunner of The Goldbergs along with producer Chris Bishop after creator Adam F. Goldberg stepped down.
