= Sam Lerner =

American actor (born 1992)

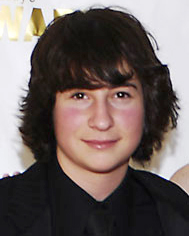
- Lerner at the 2007 Annie Awards
- Born: Samuel Bryce Lerner; September 27, 1992 (age 34); Los Angeles, California, U.S.
- Occupation: Actor
- Years active: 2003–present
- Partner: Olivia Sui (2018–present)
- Father: Ken Lerner
- Relatives: Michael Lerner (paternal uncle)

Samuel Bryce Lerner (born September 27, 1992) is an American actor. He is best known for his role as Geoff Schwartz in the ABC sitcom The Goldbergs (2013–2023), and as Quinn Goldberg in the science fiction film Project Almanac (2015). His voice roles include the leading role of Zak Saturday in the animated series The Secret Saturdays (2008–2010) and Charles "Chowder" in the supernatural film Monster House (2006).

== Early and personal life ==
Samuel Bryce Lerner was born on September 27, 1992, at Cedars-Sinai Medical Center in Los Angeles, California. His father, Ken Lerner, is an actor and his mother, Patricia Klein, is a journalist who previously worked for the Los Angeles Times. His paternal uncle was actor Michael Lerner, and their family is Jewish.

Lerner has been in a relationship with Smosh cast member Olivia Sui since 2018.

== Career ==
Lerner appeared in the feature film Envy, as the son of Ben Stiller and Rachel Weisz's characters. In addition, he portrayed Sam Robards's characters in the pilot by ABC, My Life With Men, and the son of John Leguizamo and Claire Forlani's characters in an untitled Brett Ratner-directed pilot for CBS.

Lerner voiced Chowder in the film Monster House (2006). He was nominated for the 2006 Annie Award for Best Voice Acting in an Animated Feature for his role, but lost the award to Ian McKellen for Flushed Away.

He has appeared on the television shows Malcolm in the Middle, The King of Queens, Two and a Half Men, Oliver Beene, and Sonny With a Chance, and had a recurring voice role on the Cartoon Network show Whatever Happened to Robot Jones?. He also voiced Zak Saturday in the Cartoon Network series The Secret Saturdays.

From 2013 until 2023, Lerner portrayed Geoff Schwartz in the ABC series The Goldbergs.

On October 16, 2017, Lerner was cast as Ronnie in the Blumhouse supernatural thriller film Truth or Dare. The film was released in theaters on April 13, 2018.

== Filmography ==
=== Film ===
Year	Title	Role	Notes
2004	Envy	Michael	
2006	Monster House	Chowder (voice)	Nominated – Annie Award for Voice Acting in a Feature Production
2010	Seventeen	Aiden	Short film
2012	Nobody Walks	Avi	
2015	Project Almanac	Quinn Goldberg	
2016	Mono	Ivan Gregory	
2017	Fun Mom Dinner	Alex	
2017	Walk of Fame	Rowe	
2018	Truth or Dare	Ronnie	

=== Television ===
Year	Title	Role	Notes
2003	Malcolm in the Middle	Patrick	Episode: "Kicked Out"
2003	My Life with Men	Marty	Unsold pilot
2003	Whatever Happened to... Robot Jones?	Various voices	2 episodes
2003	Two and a Half Men	Andrew	Episode: "Twenty-five Little Pre-pubers Without a Snoot-ful"
2004	Oliver Beene	The Kid	Episode: "Soup to Nuts"
2004	The King of Queens	Donny	Episode: "Multiple Plots"
2005	Untitled David Diamond / David Weissman	Jackson	Unsold pilot
2007	Las Vegas	Hershel Lipshutz	Episode: "Run, Cooper, Run!"
2008–2010	The Secret Saturdays	Zak Saturday, Zak Monday (voice)	30 episodes
2010	Sonny with a Chance	Dinka	Episode: "Sonny Get Your Goat"
2010	Rizzoli & Isles	Quinn	Episode: "Born to Run"
2011	NCIS	Nathan Tobias	Episode: "Restless"
2011	Harry's Law	Zach Elwood	Episode: "Bad to Worse"
2011–2014	Suburgatory	Evan	13 episodes
2012	Happily Divorced	Production Assistant	Episode: "A Star Is Reborn"
2012	Like Father	Mike	Unsold pilot
2014–2023	The Goldbergs	Geoff Schwartz	Recurring role (seasons 2–4); main role (seasons 5–10), 161 episodes
2015	Lethal Seduction	Walter	Television film
2017	Workaholics	Michael	Episode: "Party Gawds"
2018–2019	Trolls: The Beat Goes On!	King Gristle (voice)	8 episodes
2019	Celebrity Family Feud	Himself	Episode: "Black-ish vs. The Goldbergs"
2019	Schooled	Geoff Schwartz	Episode: "Dr. Barry"
2019	Ballers	Dan	3 episodes
2021	Trolls: TrollsTopia	King Gristle (voice)	Episode: "Piney & Lord Prickles"

=== Video games ===
Year	Title	Role	Notes
2006	Monster House	Chowder	
2009	The Secret Saturdays: Beasts of the 5th Sun	Zak Saturday	
