= Sean Giambrone =

American actor (born 1999)

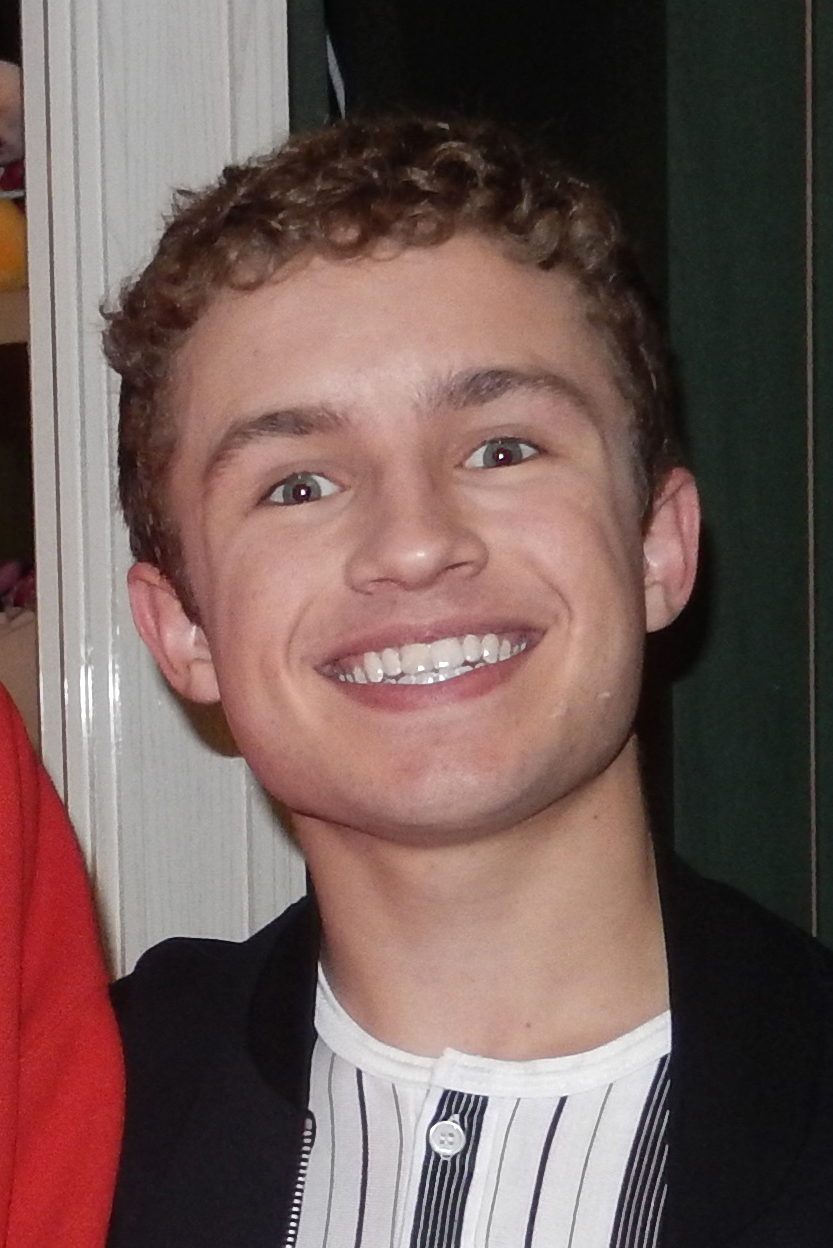
- Giambrone in 2019
- Born: May 30, 1999 (age 27); St. Joseph, Michigan, U.S.
- Occupation: Actor
- Years active: 2008–present

Sean Giambrone (born May 30, 1999) is an American actor. He is best known for playing Adam F. Goldberg in the sitcom The Goldbergs. His other on-screen roles include Ron Stoppable in the Disney Channel film Kim Possible, and Montgomery in Pizza Movie. His voice acting credits include Luan's boyfriend Benny in The Loud House, Yumyulack Opposites in Solar Opposites, Jeff Randell in Clarence, Russell in Russell Madness, Ben Pincus in Jurassic World Camp Cretaceous and its sequel series Jurassic World: Chaos Theory, and Jimmy McGill in Slippin' Jimmy.

== Early life ==
Giambrone was born in St. Joseph, Michigan to a family of Italian and German descent, and raised in Park Ridge, Illinois, where he attended Lincoln Middle School and Maine South High School. As of 2019, he is based in Los Angeles, but often visits Park Ridge.

== Career ==
Giambrone started his acting career at age nine, starring in television commercials for McDonald's and Friendly's Restaurants, among others. His first film role came in 2012, where he played Afro Boy in I Heart Shakey.

From 2013 to 2023, Giambrone played the part of Adam Goldberg, the youngest child of Beverly (Wendi McLendon-Covey) and Murray (Jeff Garlin), in the ABC comedy series The Goldbergs.

From 2014 to 2018, Giambrone provided the voice of Jeff Randell, the title character's best friend, on the Cartoon Network animated series Clarence. He also made an appearance in R.L. Stine's The Haunting Hour, and provided the voice of a bull terrier named Russell in the 2015 DVD film Russell Madness. In 2019, Giambrone co-starred with Sadie Stanley in the film Kim Possible, where he played Ron Stoppable, the best friend and sidekick of Stanley's title character, and was credited in the soundtrack.

From 2020 to 2022, he voiced Ben Pincus in Jurassic World: Camp Cretaceous. Since 2024, he reprised his role in Jurassic World: Chaos Theory.

== Filmography ==
=== Film ===
Year	Title	Role	Notes
2012	I Heart Shakey	Toledo Kid #3 (Afro Boy)	
2015	Russell Madness	Russell (voice)	Direct-to-video
2015	Mark & Russell's Wild Ride	Russell	Television film
2017	The Emoji Movie	Travis (voice)	Cameo
2018	Ralph Breaks the Internet	eBoy (voice)	Cameo
2019	Kim Possible	Ron Stoppable	Television film
2019	The Secret Life of Pets 2	Cotton (voice)	Cameo
2026	Pizza Movie	Montgomery	
TBA	Slay	Jordi	Post-production

=== Television ===
Year	Title	Role	Notes
2013–2023	The Goldbergs	Adam Goldberg	Main role
2014–2018	Clarence	Jeff Randell (voice)	Main role
2014	R. L. Stine's The Haunting Hour: The Series	Sean	Episode: "I'm Not Martin"
2018–2020	Big Hero 6: The Series	Richardson Mole (voice)	12 episodes
2018	Adventure Time	Shermy (voice)	Episode: "Come Along with Me"
2019–present	The Loud House	Benny/Mrs. Appleblossom (voice)	
2019	Celebrity Family Feud	Himself	Episode: "Black-ish vs. The Goldbergs"
2019	Rapunzel's Tangled Adventure	Teenage Eugene (voice)	Episode: "No Time Like the Past"
2019–2020	Harley Quinn	Joshua Cobblepot (voice)	3 episodes
2020–2025	Solar Opposites	Yumyulack Opposites (voice)	Main role
2020–2022	Jurassic World Camp Cretaceous	Ben Pincus (voice)	Main role
2021–2022	The Chicken Squad	Riley (voice)	12 episodes
2022	We Baby Bears	Francis (voice)	Episode: "Baby Bear Genius"
2022	Slippin' Jimmy	Jimmy McGill (voice)	Main role
2022	The Ghost and Molly McGee	Reggie (voice)	Episode: "The Internship"
2022–present	Spidey and His Amazing Friends	Ant-Man (voice)	
2023	Adventure Time: Fionna and Cake	Shermy (voice)	2 episodes
2023	Carol & the End of the World	Steven (voice)	3 episodes
2024–2025	Jurassic World: Chaos Theory	Ben Pincus (voice)	Main role
2025	Super Duper Bunny League	Fizzlor (voice)	Episode: "Cool Dudes from Space"
2025–2026	Kabu	Bearnard (voice)	

=== Video games ===
Year	Title	Role	Notes
2022	Warped Kart Racers	Yumyulack (voice)	Archival recording
