= Troy Gentile =

American actor (born 1993)

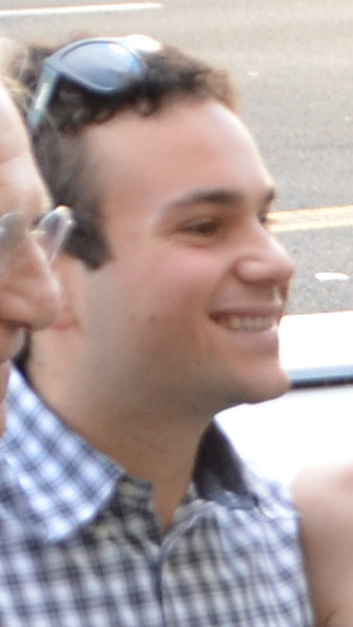
- Gentile in 2014
- Born: Troy Francis Farshi; October 27, 1993 (age 33); Boca Raton, Florida, U.S.
- Occupation: Actor
- Years active: 2005–present

Troy Gentile (born Troy Francis Farshi; October 27, 1993) is an American actor best known for his roles as Mark in Hotel for Dogs (2009) and Barry Goldberg on the comedy series The Goldbergs (2013–2023), and for playing young versions of Jack Black‘s characters in Nacho Libre and Tenacious D in The Pick of Destiny (both 2006). He is also known for his role in Bad News Bears (2005).

== Early life ==
Gentile was born in Boca Raton, Florida, to an Italian-American mother, Debra (née Gentile) and an Iranian father, Albert Farshi.

He attended community college before he was cast in The Goldbergs.

== Career ==
He portrayed a young Craig Ferguson on a segment of The Late Late Show with Craig Ferguson in October 2005. He later appeared in films such as Bad News Bears, Nacho Libre, Good Luck Chuck, Drillbit Taylor, and Hotel for Dogs. From 2013 to 2023, he portrayed Barry Goldberg in the ABC comedy series The Goldbergs.

== Filmography ==
=== Film ===
Year	Title	Role	Notes
2005	Bad News Bears	Matthew Hooper	
2006	Nacho Libre	Young Nacho	
2006	Tenacious D in The Pick of Destiny	Lil' JB	
2007	9 Lives of Mara	Larry	
2007	I Could Never Be Your Woman	Fighting Boy	
2007	Order Up	Boy	Short film
2007	Good Luck Chuck	Young Stu	
2008	Pineapple Express	Troy Jones	Unrated version only (uncredited)
2008	Drillbit Taylor	Ryan "T-Dog" Anderson	
2009	Hotel for Dogs	Mark	
2011	Pig Lady	Justin	Short film
2025	A Breed Apart	Mason Kelly	

=== Television ===
Year	Title	Role	Notes
2006	The Suite Life of Zack & Cody	Jeremy	Episode: "Odd Couples"
2006	Zip	Nelson	Pilot
2007	Fugly	Nathan	Pilot
2008	Entourage	Mitchell Levine	Episode: "The All Out Fall Out"
2010	Hawthorne	R.J. Paxton	Episode: "The Starting Line"
2013–2023	The Goldbergs	Barry Goldberg	Main role
2015	The Middle	Kid at Party	Episode: "Operational Infiltration"
2019–2020	Schooled	Barry Goldberg	6 episodes
2019	Celebrity Family Feud	Himself	Episode: "Black-ish vs. The Goldbergs"
2020	That One Time	Kevin Brooks	Pilot

== Awards and nominations ==
=== Film ===
Year	Category	Award	Work	Result
2005	Young Artist Award	Best Performance by an Ensemble in a Feature Film	Bad News Bears	Won
2006	Young Artist Award	Best Supporting Young Actor in a Feature Film	Nacho Libre	Nominated
2008	Young Artist Award	Best Performance by an Ensemble in a Feature Film	Drillbit Taylor	Nominated
2008	Tabloid Witch Awards	Best Supporting Actor	9 Lives of Mara	Won
