= Brand (surname) =

- Pronunciation: brænd
- Gender: Male

Origin
- Origin: Old Norse, Old English, Proto-Germanic 'brandaz'
- Meaning: "sword", "fire"
- Region of origin: England, Scotland, Scandinavia, the Netherlands, North Germany

Other names
- Nicknames: Brand, Brandon
- Related names: Brandr, Brandt, Brant, Brando, Brandes, Brandon, Brandis

Brand is a surname. It usually is a patronymic from the Germanic personal name Brando ("sword") or a short form of a compound personal name such as Hildebrand. The surname originated separately in England, Scotland, Scandinavia, the Netherlands, and North Germany. The proto-Germanic word for 'brand' is 'brandaz'.

Notable people with the surname include:

- Adam Brand (explorer) (before 1692–1746), German merchant and explorer
- Adam Brand (born 1970), Australian country music singer
- Adolf Brand (1874–1945), German activist for homosexual rights
- Alexander Brand (born 1977), Colombian boxer
- Andrea Brand (born 1959), American molecular biology professor at the University of Cambridge
- Arie van den Brand (born 1951), Dutch GreenLeft politician
- Aron Brand (1910–1977), Israeli pediatric cardiologist
- Arthur Brand (1853–1917), British Liberal politician
- August Brand (1863–1930), German botanist
- Charles Brand (disambiguation), several people
- Chris Brand (1943–2017), British psychologist
- Christian Brand (born 1972), German football player and coach
- Christianna Brand (1907–1988), British crime writer and children's author
- Christine Brand (born 1973), Swiss writer and journalist
- Christoffel Brand (1797–1875), South African statesman
- Colette Brand (born 1967), Swiss freestyle skier
- Daniel Brand (1935–2015), American wrestler
- Daphny van den Brand (born 1978), Dutch cyclo-cross, road bicycle and mountain bike racer
- David Brand, 5th Viscount Hampden (1903–1975), English peer, cricketer, soldier and banker
- David Brand (1912–1979), Australian politician
- David Brand (footballer) (born 1951), English footballer, National Coach of Samoa 2002–2005
- David Brand, Lord Brand (1923–1996), Scottish judge
- Dionne Brand (born 1953), Canadian writer
- Elton Brand (born 1979), American basketball player and general manager
- Erland Brand (1922–2020), Swedish painter
- Esther Brand (1922–2015), South African athlete
- Gerry Brand (1906–1996), South African rugby union player
- Gideon Brand van Zyl (1873–1956), South African Governor-General
- Glen Brand (1923–2008), American Freestyle wrestler
- Gordon J. Brand (1955–2020), English golfer
- Gordon Brand Jnr (1958–2019), Scottish golfer
- Hans-Joachim Brand (1916–1945), German Luftwaffe pilot
- Hansi Brand (1912–2000), Hungarian-born Zionist
- Heather Brand (born 1982), Zimbabwean swimmer
- Heiner Brand (born 1952), West German handball player and coach
- Hennig Brand (c. 1630 – c. 1710), German alchemist and physician
- Henry Brand, 1st Viscount Hampden (1814–1892), British politician
- Henry Brand, 2nd Viscount Hampden (1841–1906), British Governor of New South Wales
- Hubert Brand (1870–1955), Royal Navy officer
- Ilona Brand (born 1958), East German luger
- Jack Brand (born 1953), German goalkeeper
- James T. Brand (1886–1964), judge in Oregon
- James Brand (musician) (1976–2010), American musician
- James Brand (merchant) (1822–1897), Scottish-American merchant
- Jan Brand (field hockey) (1908–1969), Dutch field hockey player
- Jeroen Brand (born 1982), Dutch cricketer
- Jo Brand (born 1957), British feminist comedian
- Joel Brand (1907–1964), Holocaust survivor; co-founder of the Hungarian Aid and Rescue Committee
- Johannes Brand (1823–1888), fourth president of the Orange Free State
- Jolene Brand (born 1934), American actress
- Joop Brand (born 1936), Dutch football player and manager
- Jule Brand (born 2002), German football player and 2022 Golden Girl winner
- Katy Brand (born 1979), English actress, comedian and writer
- Kris Brand (born 1983), Canadian volleyball player
- Lotte Brand (1910–1986), German art historian
- Lucinda Brand (born 1989), Dutch racing cyclist
- Michael Brand (art historian) (born 1958), Australian scholar
- Michael Brand (composer) (born 1952), English orchestral conductor and composer
- Michael Brand (politician) (born 1973), German politician
- Michael Brand (1815–1870), birth name of Hungarian composer Mihály Mosonyi
- Millen Brand (1906–1980), American writer and poet
- Mona Brand (1915–2007), Australian playwright, poet and freelance writer
- Myles Brand (1942–2009), American University and NCAA president
- Nadja Brand (born 1975), South African-born actress and producer
- Neil Brand (born 1958), British dramatist, composer and author
- Neville Brand (1920–1992), American actor
- Oscar Brand (1920–2016), Canadian folk singer/songwriter
- Paul Brand (disambiguation)
- Peter Brand (disambiguation)
- Pepe Brand (1900–1971), Spanish professional football player and manager
- Quintin Brand (1893–1968), British pilot
- Rachel Brand (born 1973), American lawyer, US Associate Attorney General 2017–2018
- Ralph Brand (1936–2026), Scottish footballer
- Renée Brand (1900–1980), Jewish-German writer in Exile in England
- Robert Brand, 1st Baron Brand (1878–1963), British civil servant and businessman
- Ron Brand (born 1940), American baseball player
- Russell Brand (born 1975), English comedian and actor
- Simón Brand (born 1970), Colombian film director
- Steffen Brand (born 1965), German steeple chase runner
- Steven Brand (born 1969), Scottish actor
- Stewart Brand (born 1938), American writer, editor, and futurist
- Theodor von Brand (1899–1978), German-born American parasitologist
- Theodor P. Von Brand (1926–2004), American judge, son of Theodor
- Ulrich Brand (born 1967), German political scientist
- Vance D. Brand (born 1931), American astronaut
- William Brand (1888–1979), Australian politician
- William Brand (botanist) (1807–1869), Scottish solicitor, banker, botanist and plant collector
- William H. Brand (1824–1891), New York politician

Fictional characters:

- Brand, the Burning of Vengeance, a playable champion character in the MOBA video game League of Legends
- Amelia Brand, a scientist from the sci-fi movie Interstellar

== See also ==
- Brand, Brandel, Brandl, Brands, Brändle, Breindel, Brendel, Brendl, Brendle, Brentel, Brindle, Brundle, Prendel
- Brandt (name)
