= Brands (surname) =

Brands is a Dutch and Low Saxon patronymic surname. Brand is a short version of names ending in -brand, like Hildebrand and IJsbrand. Notable people with the surname include:

- Daniel Brands (born 1987), German tennis player
- Eugène Brands (1913–2002), Dutch painter
- Frans Brands (1940–2008), Belgian cyclist
- Gunnar Brands (born 1956), German classical scholar and archaeologist
- Hal Brands (born 1983), American historian, son of H.W.
- H. W. Brands (born 1953), American historian
- Kevin Brands (born 1988), Dutch footballer
- Stefan Brands (born ca. 1970), Dutch cryptographer
- Terry Brands (born 1968), American sport wrestler
- Tom Brands (born 1968), American sport wrestler and coach
- X Brands (1927–2000), American actor

== See also ==
- Ernie Brandts (born 1956), Dutch football defender and manager
- Brandts Buys, a family of Dutch musicians
- Brand, Brandel, Brandl, Brands, Brändle, Breindel, Brendel, Brendl, Brendle, Brentel, Brindle, Brundle, Prendel
- Brandt (name)
