= Brandl =

Brandl is a surname of German origin. People with that surname include:

- David Brandl (born 1987), Austrian swimmer
- Herbert Brandl (1959–2025), Austrian painter
- Johann Brandl (1835–1913), Austrian composer
- Johann Evangelist Brandl (1760–1837), German composer
- John Brandl (1937–2008), American economist, state legislator and academic administrator
- Mark Staff Brandl (born 1955), American artist, art historian and art critic
- Martin Brandl (born 1981), German politician
- Maximilian Brandl (born 1997), German mountain bike racer
- Nadine Brandl (born 1990), Austrian synchronized swimmer
- Petr Brandl (1668–1735), Bohemian painter
- Reinhard Brandl (born 1977), German politician
- Therese Brandl (1902–1948), German Nazi concentration camp guard executed for war crimes
- Uwe Brandl (born 1959), German politician

== See also ==
- Georg Brandl Egloff (born 1963), American composer and performer
- Brandel, Brandl, Brändle, Breindel, Brendel, Brendl, Brendle, Brentel, Brindle, Brundle, Prendel
