= Brändle =

Brändle, or Brandle, is a surname. Notable people with the surname include:

- Daniel Brändle (born 1992), Liechtensteiner international footballer who plays as a midfielder
- Jonas Brändle (born 2000), German footballer
- Joseph E. Brandle (1839–1909), American soldier who received the Medal of Honor during the American Civil War
- Kurt Brändle (1912–1943), German Luftwaffe military aviator during World War II
- Matthias Brändle (born 1989), Austrian professional road bicycle racer
- Naemi Brändle (born 2001), Swiss canoeist
- Pola Brändle (born 1980), German artist
- Rea Brändle (1953–2019), Swiss journalist

== See also ==
- Brandel, Brändle, Breindel, Brendel, Brendelia, Brendl, Brendle, Brentel, Brindle, Brundle, Prendel
