= Brindle (surname) =

Brindle is a surname. Notable people with the surname include:

- Arran Brindle (born 1981), English cricketer, member of the England Women's team
- Dave Brindle (fl. 1980s–1990s), Canadian broadcast journalist and producer
- Frederick Brindle (1908–1983), English professional rugby league footballer
- Melbourne Brindle (1904–1995), Australian-American illustrator and painter
- Reginald Brindle (1925–1998), English cricketer
- Reginald Smith Brindle (1917–2003), British composer and writer
- Robert Brindle (1837–1916), English prelate of the Roman Catholic Church
- Timothy Brindle (born 1980), American Christian hip hop musician
- Tom Brindle (footballer) (1861–1905), English footballer
- Tom Brindle (politician) (1878–1950), member of the New Zealand Legislative Council

== Fictional characters ==
- Brindle, Brindle Family from Small Wonder

== See also ==
- Brandel, Brändle, Breindel, Brendel, Brendelia, Brendl, Brendle, Brentel, Brindle, Brundle, Prendel
