= Prendel =

Prendel is a German surname, a phonetic variant of Brendel. Notable people with the surname include:

- Jan Wilhelm Prendel (1905–1992), German architect and construction official
- Romul Prendel (1851–1904), Russian geologist, mineralogist, and crystallographer; the founder of meteoritology in the Russian Empire
- Victor von Prendel (1766–1852), Austrian and Russian general

== See also ==
- Brand, Brandel, Brandl, Brands, Brändle, Breindel, Brendel, Brendl, Brendle, Brentel, Brindle, Brundle, Prendel
