= Brundle =

Brundle is a surname. Notable people with the surname include:

- Alex Brundle (born 1990), British racing driver
- Fred Brundle, namesake of the Orangeville/Brundle Field Aerodrome
- James Brundle (born 1986), British motorcycle speedway racer
- Martin Brundle (born 1959), British racing driver
- Mitch Brundle (born 1994), British semi-professional footballer
- Robin Brundle (born 1962), British auto racing driver and businessman

== Fictional characters ==
- BrundleFly, fictional character from the 1986 David Cronenberg film The Fly
- Martin Brundle (The Fly), fictional character from the 1989 film The Fly II
- Seth Brundle, fictional character in the 1986 remake of the film The Fly

== See also ==
- Brandel, Brändle, Breindel, Brendel, Brendelia, Brendl, Brendle, Brentel, Brindle, Brundle, Prendel
