= Charles Brand =

Charles Brand may refer to:

- Charles Brand (general) (1873–1961), Australian Army brigadier-general in World War I
- Charles H. Brand (1861–1933), American politician, businessman, jurist and lawyer
- Charles Brand (Ohio politician) (1871–1966), U.S. representative from Ohio
- Charles Brand of Dundee, a firm of housebreakers
- Charles Amarin Brand (1920–2013), French prelate of the Roman Catholic Church
- Charles John Brand (1879–1949), United States Department of Agriculture official
- Charles Brand (water polo) (1916–1984), British Olympic water polo player
