= Egli =

Egli (Swiss German: from a pet form of the ancient Germanic personal name Egenolf or Egilolf (see Egloff)) is both a given name and a surname.

Notable people with the given name include:

- Egli Kaja (born 1997), Albanian footballer

Notable people with the surname include:

- Alphons Egli (1924–2016), Swiss politician
- Jean-François Egli (1928–2023), judge on the Swiss Federal Supreme Court
- André Egli (born 1958), Swiss footballer
- Beatrice Egli (born 1988), Swiss singer
- Charles Émile Egli (1877–1937), Swiss illustrator and painter
- Fritz Egli (born 1937), Swiss motorcycle racer
- Hans Egli, Swiss sports shooter
- John Egli (1921–1982), American college men's basketball coach
- Keith Egli (born c. 1962), Canadian politician
- Marie-Andrea Egli (born 1989), Swiss footballer
- Paul Egli (1911–1997), Swiss road bicycle racer
