= Brandle =

Brandle may refer to:

- Brandle (card game), a German card game for 4 players
- Brändle, the surname, also sometimes spelt Brandle
