= Brentel =

Brentel is a German surname associated with the Swabian Brentel family of painters. Notable persons with the surname include:

- Friedrich Brentel (1580–1651), Alsatian miniature painter, draftsman and engraver

== See also ==
- Brandel, Brändle, Breindel, Brendel, Brendelia, Brendl, Brendle, Brentel, Brindle, Brundle, Prendel
