= Jan Brandts Buys =

Dutch composer

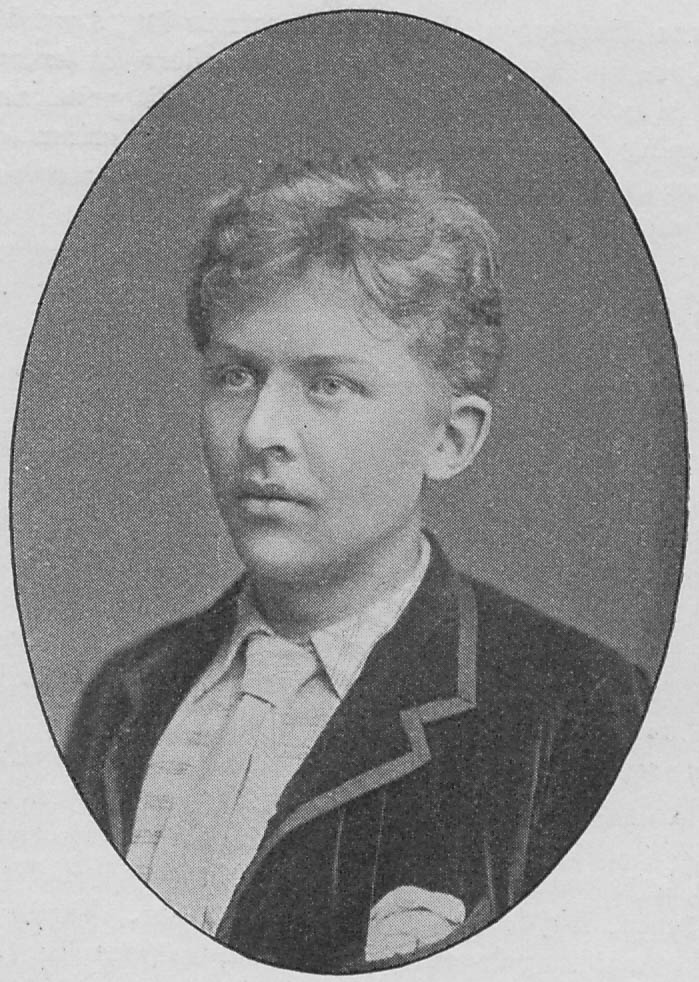
Jan Brandts Buys.

Jan Willem Frans Brandts Buys (Zutphen, 12 September 1868 – Salzburg, 7 December 1933) was a Dutch-Austrian composer who came from a long line of Dutch organists and composers of protestant church music.

His father was an organ player in the town of Zutphen in the Netherlands, where Jan was born. He studied at the Raff Conservatory in Frankfurt and in 1892 settled in Vienna, where he got to know Johannes Brahms, who, along with Edvard Grieg, praised his early works. His piano concerto won an important international prize and such famous artists as Lilli Lehmann often included his songs on the same program with those of Franz Schubert.

== Work ==
Brandts Buys' oeuvre comprises piano pieces, organ pieces, chamber music, orchestral music, songs, pieces for choir and cantatas, operas and many arrangements - such as piano arrangements of all the symphonies of Schubert and Beethoven).

However, his reputation today mainly rests on his comic operas and operettas, such as The Tailors of Schönau [1916] and The Man in the Moon [1922], which gained considerable international acclaim. These two operas, along with Glockenspiel [1913] and Der Eroberer [1918] were first performed at the Dresden Hofoper, with casts that included the young Richard Tauber. Of the ten chamber music works he wrote, only the Romantische Serenade (Romantic Serenade), composed in 1905, was performed with any regularity before disappearing shortly after his death. In the United States, it figured in the first New York program given by the Zoellner Quartet after returning from its formative years in Europe, at which time the work had been heard in that city only once before. The quartet continued to program the serenade as late as 1919.
