= Norwegian Pharmacy Association =

Norwegian Pharmacy Association (Norwegian: Apotekforeningen) is a trade organization representing the pharmacies and pharmacy owners in Norway. In addition to the three large chains and hospital pharmacies, 20 independent pharmacists are members of the organization.

The Norwegian Pharmacy Association is a trade association for Pharmacies located in Norway. It was established in 1881.

Notable people include Leif Brendel, secretary-general from 1940 to 1968.
