= Egloff =

Egloff is a surname shared by several notable people:

- Ron Egloff (born 1955), former American professional football player
- Georg Brandl Egloff (born 1963), American musician
- Gustav Egloff (1886-1955) American chemist and Director of UOP
- Bruce Egloff (born 1965), former American professional baseball player
- Rick Egloff (living), American-Canadian professional football player
