= Daniel Brändle =

Liechtenstein footballer

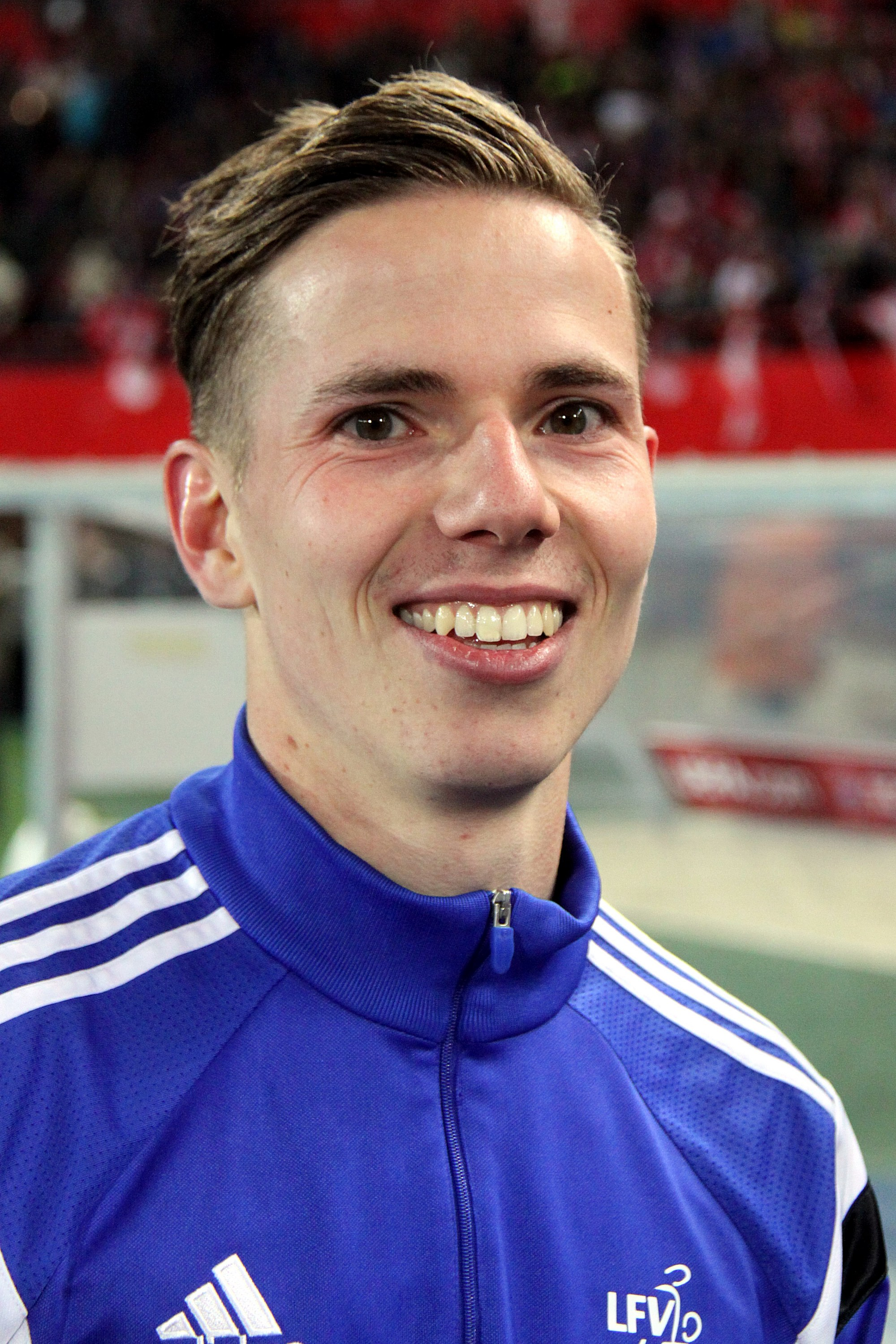

Personal information
- Date of birth: 23 January 1992 (age 34)
- Place of birth: Vaduz, Liechtenstein
- Position: Midfielder

Team information
- Current team: SV Pullach
- Number: 23

Senior career*
Years	Team	Apps	(Gls)
2008–2012	FC Balzers	12	(0)
2012–2014	FC Bern 1894	44	(8)
2014–2016	FC Münsingen	42	(6)
2016–2017	St. Andrews	11	(0)
2017–2018	FC Balzers	14	(0)
2018–2023	SV Pullach	40	(3)

International career^{‡}
2011–2014	Liechtenstein U-21	14	(0)
2014–2022	Liechtenstein	43	(0)
- * Club domestic league appearances and goals as of 26 June 2023 ‡ National team caps and goals as of 14 June 2022

Daniel Brändle (born 23 January 1992) is a former Liechtensteiner international footballer who last played for SV Pullach, as a midfielder.

== Career ==
Born in Vaduz, Brändle has played for FC Balzers, FC Bern 1894, FC Münsingen and St. Andrews.

He made his senior international debut for Liechtenstein in 2014.
