= Paul Brand =

Paul Brand may refer to:

- Paul Brand (historian) (born 1946), British legal historian
- Paul Brand (journalist), British journalist
- Paul Brand (physician) (1914–2003), English physician
