= Peter Brand =

Peter Brand may refer to:

- Peter Brand (British politician) (1947–2023), British general practitioner and politician
- Peter J. Brand (born 1967), Canadian Egyptologist
- Peter Wilhelm Brand (1900–1978), German politician
- Peter Andreas Brandt (1792–1862), Norwegian painter and illustrator
- Peter Brand, fictional character in the film Moneyball (2011), partially based on Paul DePodesta
