= Brendel =

Brendel is a surname. Notable people with the surname include:

- Albert Brendel (Wehrmacht officer) (1893–1943), Knight's Cross of the Iron Cross recipient
- Albert Heinrich Brendel (1827–1878), German painter
- Alfred Brendel (1931–2025), Czech-born Austrian classical pianist, poet and essayist
- Brian Brendell (born 1986), Namibian footballer
- Cornelia Brendel, birth name of Cornelia Foss
- Daniela Brendel (born 1973), German swimmer
- El Brendel (1890–1964), American entertainer
- Franz Brendel (1811–1868), 19th-century music critic and publisher
- Franz Brendel (canoeist), German canoeist
- Günther Brendel (1930–2026), German painter, graphic artist, and academic
- Henry W. Brendel (1857–1940), American lawyer and government official
- Jake Brendel (born 1992), American football player
- Jakob Brendel (1907–1964), German wrestler
- Joachim Brendel (1921–1974), German Luftwaffe pilot
- Karl Brendel (1871–1925), German sculptor
- Leif Brendel (1903–1972), Norwegian editor
- Maria Weigert Brendel (1902–1994), German classical art expert, wife of Otto Brendel
- Martin Brendel (1862–1939), German astronomer
- Neal Brendel (1954–2021), American rugby union player and lawyer
- Otto Brendel (1901–1973), scholar of Etruscan art
- Pascal Brendel (born 2003), German artistic gymnast
- Robert Brendel (c. 1821–1898), German botanist and model maker
- Sarah Brendel (born 1976), German pop singer
- Sebastian Brendel (born 1988), German canoeist
- Willi Brendel (1938–2006), German field hockey player
- Wolfgang Brendel (born 1947), German opera singer

== See also ==
- Brandel, Breindel, Brendel, Brendelia, Brendl, Brendle, Brentel, Prendel
- Brendel Anstey (1887–1933), English footballer
