= Pola Brändle =

German artist and photographer

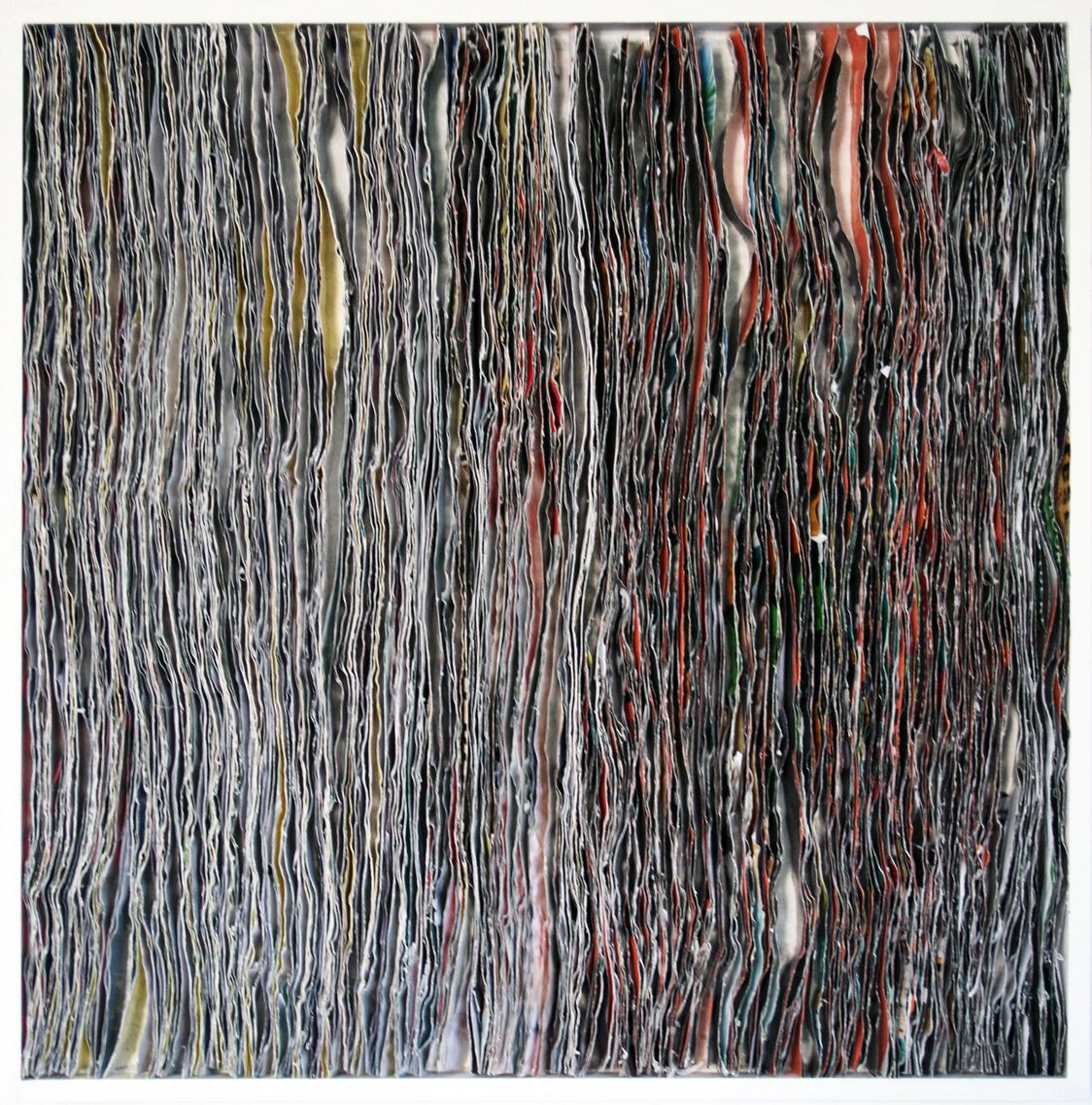
Collage in shadow gap frame, 2015, 47 x 47 cm

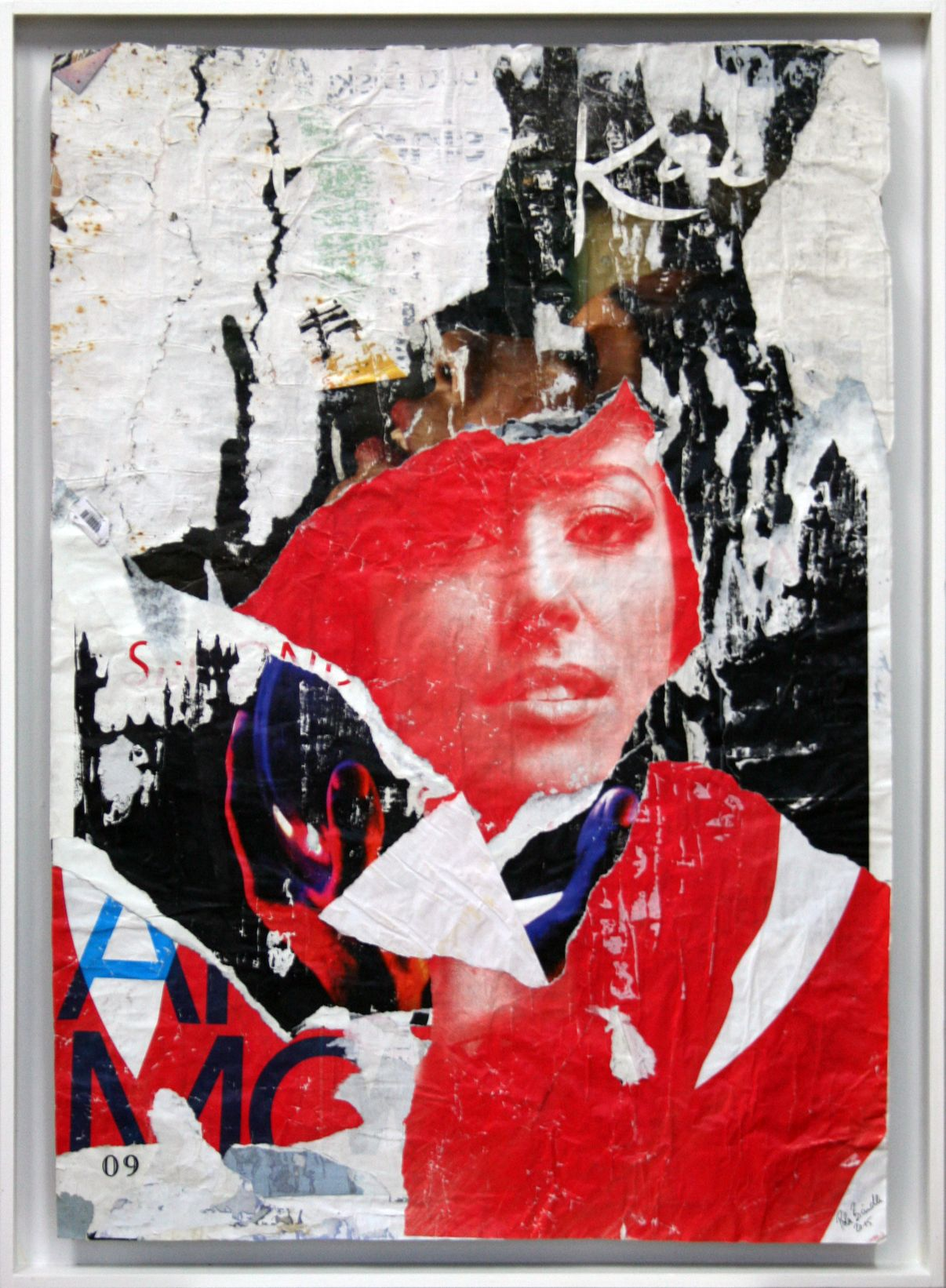
Collage/decollage in shadow gap frame, 2015, 90 x 66 cm

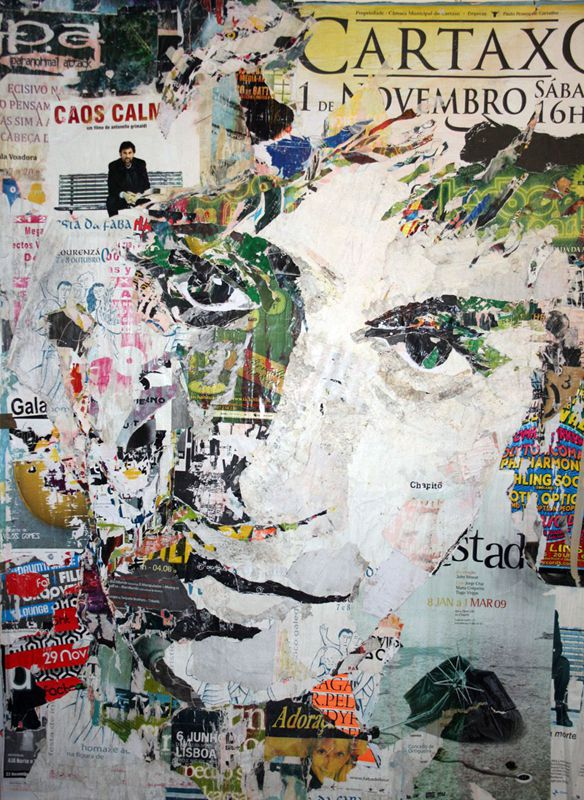
Emil Portrait, Collage/decollage, 2012, 250 x 180 cm

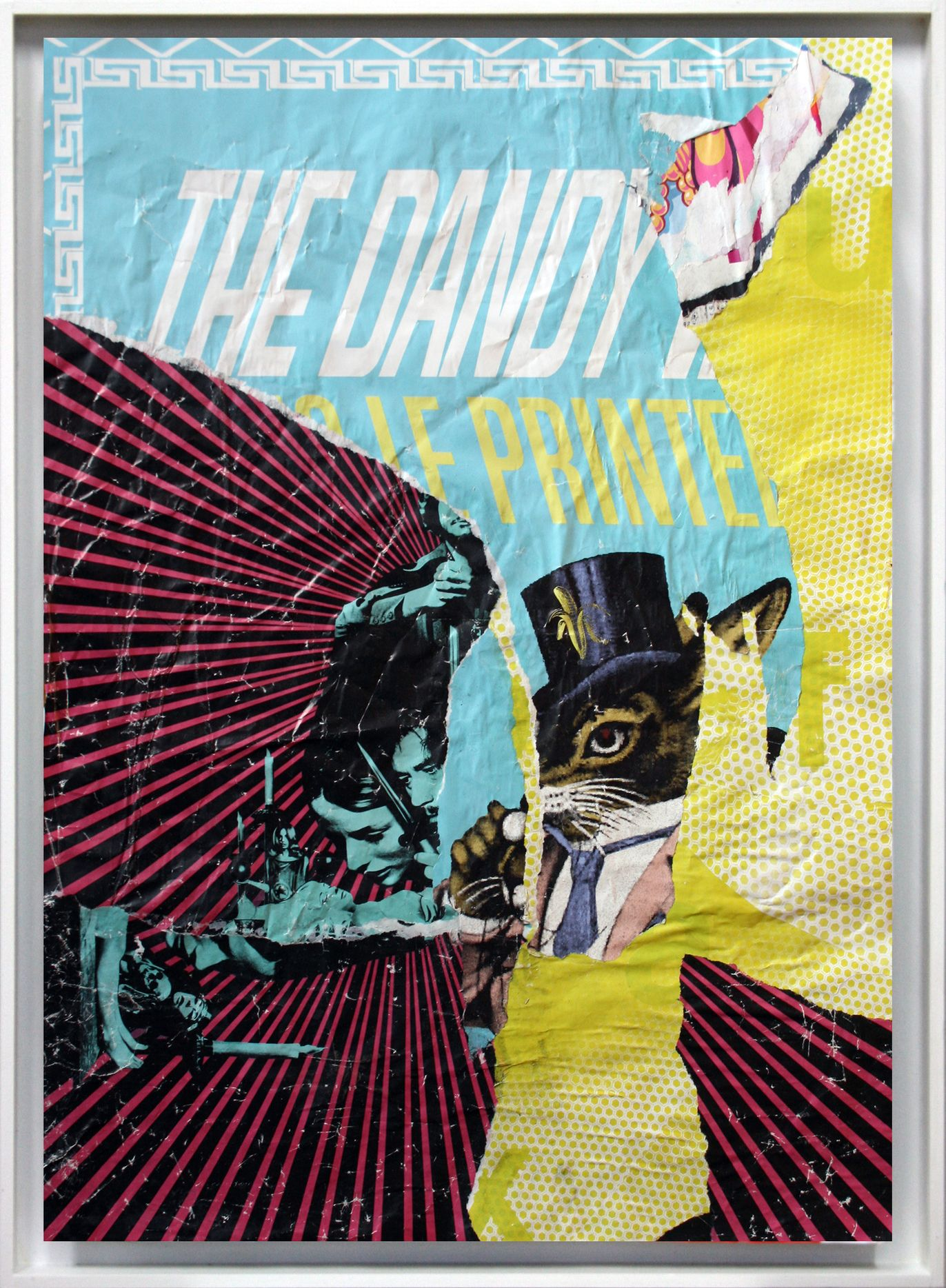
Collage/decollage in shadow gap frame, 2015, 65 x 46 cm

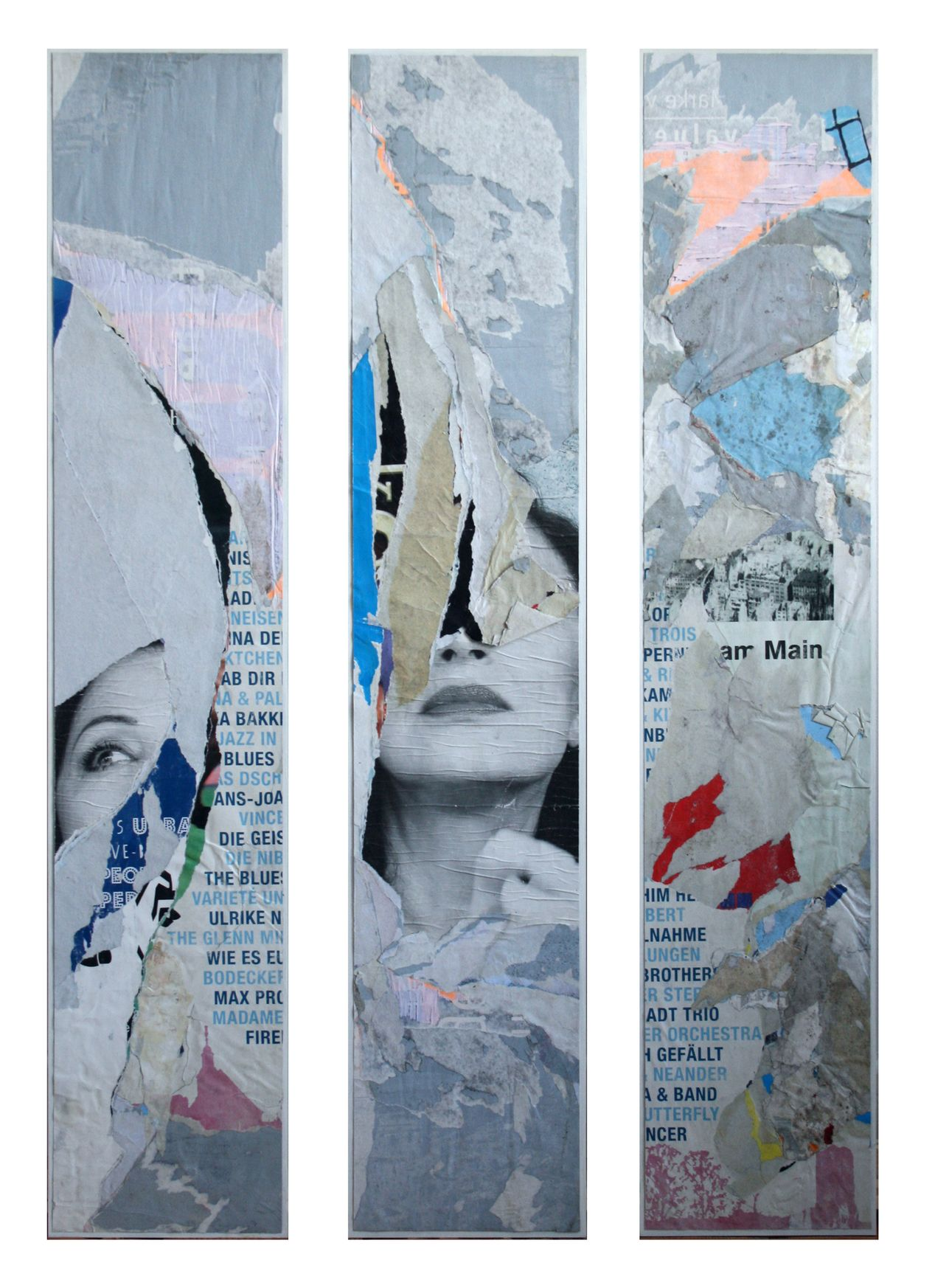
Frankfurt Looks, Collage/decollage on wood, 2015, 101 x 70 cm

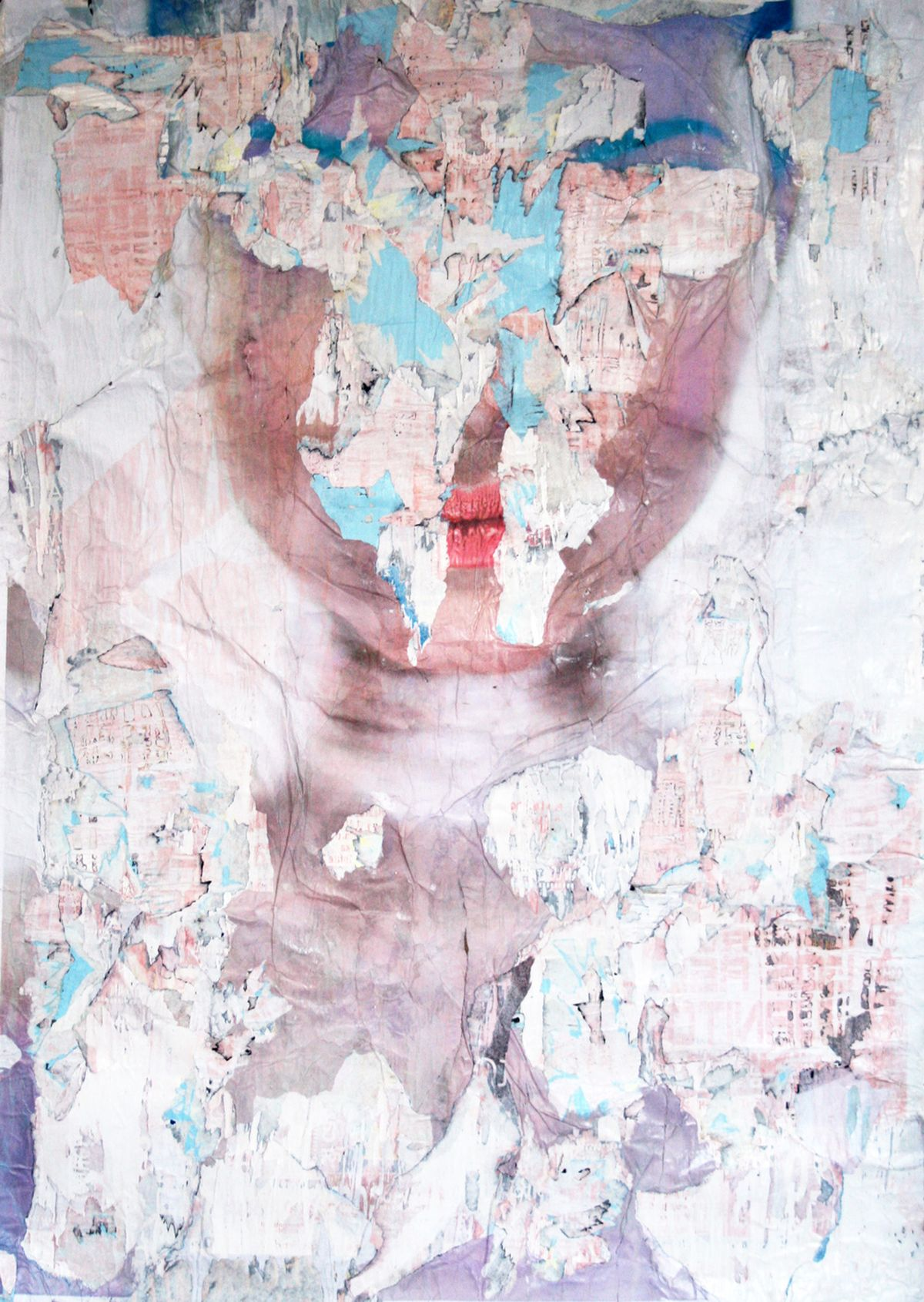
Morning Beauty, Collage/decollage, 2014, 128 x 100 cm

Pola Brändle (born April 7, 1980, in Aachen, West Germany) is a German collage/decollage artist who lives and works in Berlin Kreuzberg, Germany.

== Life ==
Brändle grew up in Aachen, and, after graduating from high school, she joined the Maastricht Academy of Fine Arts, where she earned her Bachelor of Design in 2003. Brändle's final work at the Maastricht Academy of Fine Arts was supported by the "TENT Academy Award" (Rotterdam) together with nine other nominations as best final works in the Netherlands. During her studies Brändle developed her artistic photographic potentials and discovered the fascination of posters and their artistic opportunities for further editing. After living in Portsmouth, Berlin and Lisbon, Brändle moved to the Mediterranean island of Mallorca. In 2012 Bränlde returned to Berlin Kreuzberg, where she now lives and works.

== Work ==
Brändle follows in the footsteps of the affichistes working with posters from her immediate environment but also collecting material on her travels which provide the bases of her time- and culture-specific artworks. Her work involves both small fragments and large-scale pieces ranging between pop art and abstraction.

== Exhibitions (selection) ==
This is a table of exhibitions of Pola Brändle

- 2018: Kunststation Kleinsassen, Kleinsassen, Germany
- 2017: Alte Feuerwache - project room, Berlin, Germany
- 2016: Haus am Lützowplatz, Berlin, Germany
- 2016: Hotel de Rome (Rocco Forte Hotels), Berlin, Germany
- 2015/16: Sunnubraut, Island Biennial, Gardur, Island
- 2015: RDKM, Yalova Biennial, Istanbul & Yalova, Turkey
- 2014: Kunstetage K55, Heilbronn, Germany
- 2014: MMG Gallery, Budapest, Hungary
- 2013: City Museum, Yalova, Turkey
- 2010: CoCA - Center of Contemporary Art, Seattle, US

== Literature ==
- Brändle, Pola: „Plakatief – A World in Layers“; Kerber Verlag, Bielefeld; ISBN 978-3-86678-484-0

== See also ==
- List of German women artists
