= Rea Brändle =

Swiss journalist and writer (1953–2019)

Rea Brändle (1 May 1953 – 2 September 2019) was a Swiss journalist and writer.

== Biography ==
Brändle was born on 1 May 1953 in Neu St. Johann. She grew up in upper Toggenburg. After she completed her German studies, she became a cultural editor and journalist for Tages-Anzeiger. In 1984, she contributed to the publication of the booklet Die Sprache ist kein Mann, Madame of the women's group of the Swiss Journalists Union. Later she became an independent author. In 2012, she edited a biography of writer Alfred Huggenberger with historian Mario König on behalf of the government of Thurgau. For several years, she wrote regularly for WOZ Die Wochenzeitung in Zürich. In 2006, she contributed to WOZ as a cultural editor.

She died on 2 September 2019 in Zürich.

== Publications ==
=== Books ===
- Johannes Seluner, Findling. Eine Recherche. Zürich: Limmat, 1990, ISBN 3-85791-162-X.
- Wildfremd, hautnah. Völkerschauen und Schauplätze Zürich 1880–1960. Zürich: Rotpunkt, 1995, ISBN 3-85869-120-8. 2nd edition, reworked and enlarged: Zürich, Rotpunkt, 2013, ISBN 978-3-85869-561-1
- with Felix Kauf and Ernst Scagnet: Die Regierung & Partner. Total verrückte Geschichte einer ganz normalen Entwicklung. Wattwil, Toggenburger, 2004, ISBN 3-908166-19-5.
- 200 Jahre Theater St. Gallen (ed.). Basel, Theaterkulturverlag, 2005, ISBN 3-908145-50-3 (= Schweizer Theaterjahrbuch, vol. 66).
- Über Giuseppe Reichmuth. Was macht einer mit so viel Talent. Zürich, Offizin, 2006, ISBN 3-907496-43-4.
- Nayo Bruce. Geschichte einer afrikanischen Familie in Europa. Zürich, Chronos Verlag, 2007, ISBN 978-3-0340-0868-6.
- Ammanns Vermächtnis. Aus dem Leben des Toggenburger Instrumentenmachers Ulrich Ammann, 1766–1842. Wattwil, Toggenburger, 2010, ISBN 978-3-908166-47-4.
- with Mario König: Huggenberger. Die Karriere eines Schriftstellers. Frauenfeld: Verlag des Historischen Vereins des Kantons Thurgau, 2012, ISBN 978-3-9522896-8-6.

=== Theatre works ===
- Ammanns Vermächtnis. UA: Alt St. Johann, 2002
- Herr Stauss malt an einem Bild und unser Haus ist auch drauf. UA: Lichtensteig, 2009

== Filmography ==
- Emil Zbinden (with Karl Jost and Peter Münger)
- Johannes Seluner, Fernsehen DRS, 1994
