= Charles John Brand =

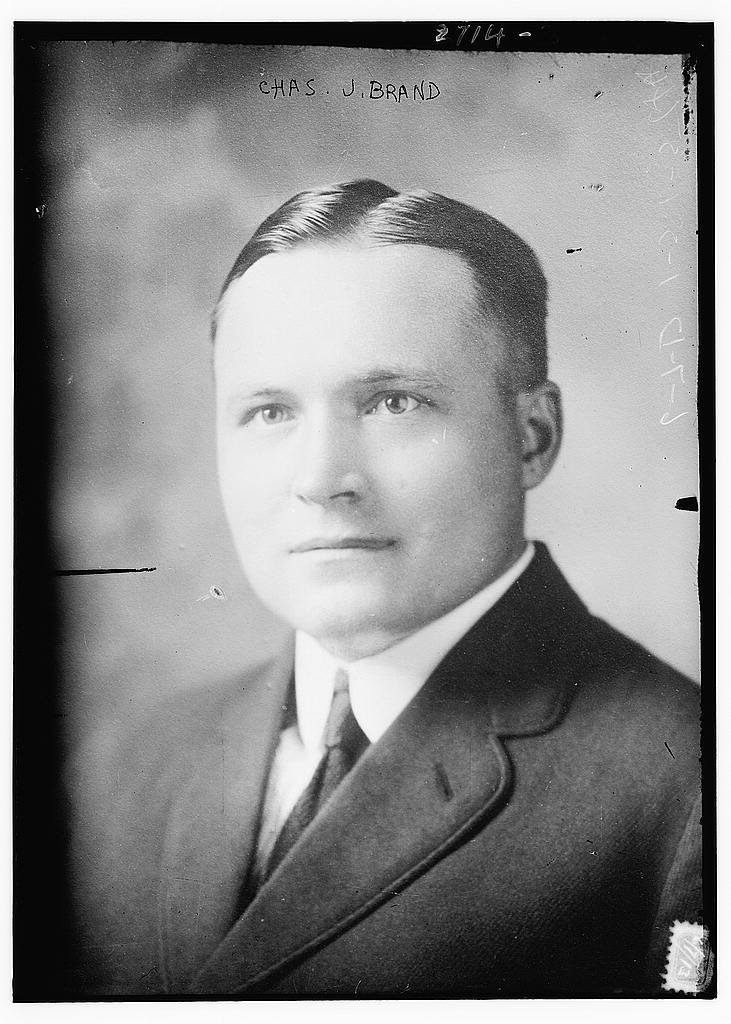
- Born: October 24, 1879; Lac qui Parle County, Minnesota
- Died: June 29, 1949 (aged 69)
- Education: University of Minnesota
- Occupation: Agricultural economist

Charles John Brand (October 24, 1879 in Lac qui Parle County, Minnesota– 1949) was Chief of the Bureau of Markets at the United States Department of Agriculture in Washington, DC.

== Biography ==
Brand graduated from the University of Minnesota in 1902. In 1913 he was a physiologist in charge of the Farmers' Cooperative Cotton. He resigned from the United States Department of Agriculture in 1925. In 1933 he left his job at the National Fertilizer Association to act as co-administrator for the Agricultural Adjustment Administration for a four-month period.

Brand died of coronary thrombosis at Doctors Hospital on June 29, 1949.

== Publications ==
- Yearbook of agriculture (1913)
