= Martin Brendel =

German astronomer

Otto Rudolf Martin Brendel (12 August 1862 – 6 September 1939) was a German astronomer. Born in Berlin-Niederschönhausen, he obtained the first successful photograph of the aurora borealis at Bossekop in northern Norway in 1892. He died in Freiburg.

The asteroid 761 Brendelia is named after Brendel.
