= Charles Brand (water polo) =

British water polo player (1916–1984)

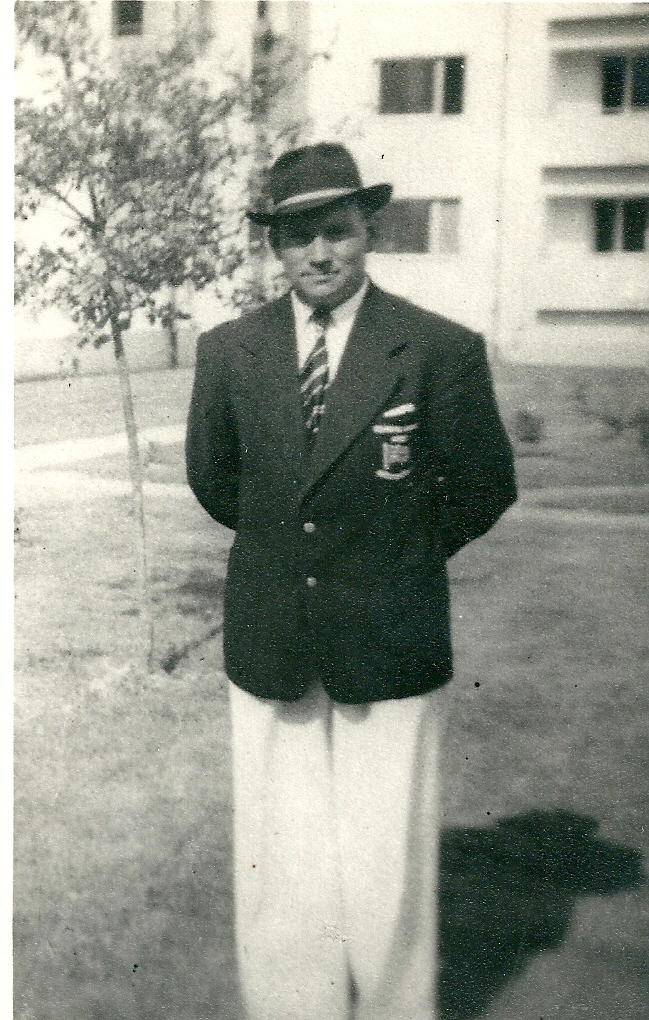
- Charlie Brand in 1948

Personal information
- Full name: Charles William Brand
- Nationality: British
- Born: 16 June 1916 Chorlton-cum-Hardy, England
- Died: July 1984 (aged 68) Blackpool, England

Sport
- Sport: Water polo

Charles William Brand (16 June 1916 – July 1984) was a British water polo player. He competed at the 1948 Summer Olympics and the 1952 Summer Olympics.
