= The Goldbergs season 4 =

The Goldbergs
- Season 4
- DVD cover
- Starring: Wendi McLendon-Covey; Sean Giambrone; Troy Gentile; Hayley Orrantia; AJ Michalka; George Segal; Jeff Garlin
- No. of episodes: 24

Release
- Original network: ABC
- Original release: September 21, 2016 – May 17, 2017

Season chronology
- ← Previous; Season 3 Next → Season 5

The fourth season of the American television comedy series The Goldbergs premiered on ABC on September 21, 2016. The season was produced by Adam F. Goldberg Productions, Happy Madison Productions, and Sony Pictures Television, and the executive producers are Adam F. Goldberg, Doug Robinson, and Seth Gordon. The season consists of 24 episodes. The season concluded on May 17, 2017.

The show explores the daily lives of the Goldberg family, a family living in Jenkintown, Pennsylvania in the 1980s. Beverly Goldberg (Wendi McLendon-Covey), the overprotective matriarch of the Goldbergs is married to Murray Goldberg (Jeff Garlin). They are the parents of three children, Erica (Hayley Orrantia), Barry (Troy Gentile), and Adam (Sean Giambrone).

ABC renewed The Goldbergs for its fourth season on March 3, 2016.

== Plot ==
Incoming freshman Adam joins junior Barry and senior Erica at William Penn. After realizing she has developed feelings for Geoff but missed her chance with him after he moved on to dating Evy Silver, Erica tries to distract herself while also attempting to figure out where she wants to attend college, but a kiss with Geoff causes his breakup with Evy, and the two decide to take things slowly before eventually becoming a couple. Lainey is accepted to a fashion design school in Georgia, and when Barry finds out she's leaving town earlier than expected, the two break up. Adam begins dating a fellow nerd, a junior named Jackie Geary. JTP's Deadhead classmate Matt Bradley joins them as their fifth member. Murray hires his brother Marvin to work at the furniture store. The season wraps up with Erica and Lainey graduating from high school.

== Cast ==
=== Main cast ===
- Wendi McLendon-Covey as Beverly Goldberg
- Sean Giambrone as Adam Goldberg
- Troy Gentile as Barry Goldberg
- Hayley Orrantia as Erica Goldberg
- AJ Michalka as Lainey Lewis
- George Segal as Albert "Pops" Solomon
- Jeff Garlin as Murray Goldberg

=== Recurring cast ===
- Tim Meadows as Mr. Glascott
- Stephen Tobolowsky as Principal Ball
- Bryan Callen as Mr. Mellor
- David Koechner as Bill Lewis
- Dan Fogler as Marvin Goldberg
- Allie Grant as Evelyn Silver
- Natalie Alyn Lind as Dana Caldwell
- Kenny Ridwan as Dave Kim
- Stephanie Katherine Grant as Emmy Mirsky
- Rowan Blanchard as Jackie Geary
- Sean Marquette as Johnny Atkins
- Quincy Fouse as Taz Money
- Matt Bush as Andy Cogan
- Sam Lerner as Geoff Schwartz
- Noah Munck as "Naked Rob" Smith
- Shayne Topp as Matt Bradley
- Niko Guardado as Ruben Amaro Jr.
- Zach Callison as Brian Corbett
- Zayne Emory as J.C. Spink
- Joshua Carlon as Michael C. Levy
- David Bloom as Michael Z. Levy

== Episodes ==
No. overall	No. in season	Title	Directed by	Written by	Original release date	Prod. code	U.S. viewers (millions)
72	1	"Breakfast Club"	David Katzenberg	Marc Firek	September 21, 2016	401	6.90
It's Adam's first day of high school, which means a clean slate for him and his nerdy friends. So he tries to reinvent himself with a new "bad boy" rep, dressing just like Judd Nelson's John Bender character in The Breakfast Club. Barry tries to establish himself as a jock, while Erica wants to have an awesome senior year by doing whatever she wants. But their plans are threatened when Beverly receives her teaching certificate to become a substitute teacher at their school. However, her fellow teachers do not welcome her and she has a terrible first day, especially when her kids won't sit with her during lunch. Principal Ball fires Beverly after she loudly cusses at him. While Erica, Adam and Lainey bicker with Beverly, Ball issues them all a Saturday detention, as well as Barry whose rude comments Lainey was reading. Adam sees this as an opportunity to live out The Breakfast Club, with Lainey as the popular princess, Barry as the jock, and Erica as the unstable basket case, given her jealous rage over Geoff and Evy. Adam proclaims himself the troubled bad boy, even though the rest of the group sees him as the nerd. They spend eight hours acting out the film by dancing and sharing their problems with each other. Beverly even shares that she wants to belong and her kids see she's just like them; struggling with her identity. Later, Murray marches down to the school and asks Principal Ball to give Beverly her job back so she has a purpose in her life instead of just being a mom, convincing Ball he can use Beverly's "skills" when he has problems with other teachers. Featured Songs: "My Sharona" by The Knack, "Don't You (Forget About Me)" by Simple Minds Notes: The date at the beginning of the episode is announced as "September 3rd" instead of "September 21st".; The episode is dedicated to "all incoming freshmen".; First of ten season co-star appearances of Alex Jennings as classmate Carla Mann.
73	2	"I Heart Video Dating"	Peter Ellis	Alex Barnow	September 28, 2016	402	6.58
Lainey, Erica and Beverly are in the mall when they are approached by the owner of a video dating service. They are shocked when demo tape the owner shows is one that features Pops. Lainey thinks that video dating might be the best way to get her single father, Bill, back out there, while Beverly insists her skills at setting up couples is superior. Bill visits the store and tries to make a video, but he can't stop pining for his ex-wife and crying. Erica decides she will have Adam make a dating video for her, but she too cries when she thinks about losing her chance with Geoff Schwartz. Meanwhile, Barry takes an assessment for career day, and the results show he should go into in accounting. Decidedly against that career choice, Barry sees Mr. Mellor hard at work with a class and thinks that being a gym teacher and coach is for him. Mr. Mellor is more than willing to mentor Barry, but it gets out of control and Murray tries to nip it in the bud. Featured Song: "Listen To Your Heart" by Roxette Guest Starring: Rob Huebel as John Calabasas Note: The episode is dedicated to "the real Coach Mellor".
74	3	"George! George Glass!"	Joanna Kerns	Aaron Kaczander	October 5, 2016	404	6.23
Adam runs into a junior at the high school, and remembers her as the cute "Waffle Girl" Zoe McIntosh (Brec Bassinger) who served their family at a restaurant a few years ago. He wants to ask her out, but feels he has to look like a "player" first. Taking a tip from the Brady Bunch episode in which Jan Brady made up the fake boyfriend George Glass, Adam makes up the girlfriend Lampie Tableman. Erica makes fun of Adam and says his plan will never work, but she soon pulls a "George Glass" of her own, making up a college-age boyfriend named Jordan Wahlberg (combining the names of two members of New Kids on the Block) in hopes that Geoff Schwartz will become jealous. Adam's plan goes into high gear as he has Dave Kim create fake hickies with a vacuum, but Dave makes too many, causing Adam to have Dave shoot him with a paintball gun to explain away the marks. Waffle Girl sees Adam at that moment, and says she too likes paintball. She invites Adam on a paintball date, but Adam gets scared while playing and makes a fool of himself. At school, Evy and the JTP shoot holes in Erica's fake boyfriend story when some of her facts don't add up. Meanwhile, Barry wants badly to go to Live Aid in Philadelphia, but Murray says no. Barry refuses Beverly's offer of tickets to see The Beach Boys, with neither he nor Beverly realizing the Beach Boys are on the bill at Live Aid. Murray has to go with Beverly instead, but he gets into an argument over a parking space, causing them to miss the concert. Beverly chastises her husband for his stubbornness, and insists he take her to Chi-Chi's for dinner, a place which Murray has vowed to never go. Murray caves and goes to Chi-Chi's, but his stubbornness ruins that, too. With Erica's life about to be ruined at school, a handsome young man claiming to be Jordan Wahlberg pulls up and—in full view of Evy and Geoff—makes reference to a frat party they attended together. Erica then breaks up with the guy. Realizing Adam helped her, she asks him why. Adam explains that Waffle Girl was just a crush for him, but what his sister feels for Geoff is real. Featured Song: "God Only Knows" by The Beach Boys Absent: AJ Michalka as Lainey Lewis Guest Starring: Brian Baumgartner as Larry, Daniel Booko as Eddie Note: The episode is dedicated to Adam's "stubborn dad".
75	4	"Crazy Calls"	Lew Schneider	Steve Basilone	October 12, 2016	405	6.47
After constantly missing phone calls and messages, Murray buys an answering machine. Erica and Barry want to use a Crazy Calls cassette tape to have a funny voice as callers leave a message, but they have to settle for their dad's voice. Murray then gets one for Pop-Pop (his father), and they get into their own message war (nearly committing Elder abuse) from not wanting to talk to each other on the phone or face to face. Frustrated with the phone always being tied up, Erica erases the message tape, but soon sees her father is depressed over not having any new messages from Pop-Pop. Meanwhile, Beverly is worried about Adam's social standing as a freshman in high school, especially when he can't find a group to sit with in the cafeteria during lunch. He then joins up with the nerds in the computer lab, who eat their lunch while playing old school RPG games. Beverly, thinking her son has settled for spending time with computer geeks, sabotages his time in the lab by "cheesing" the disk drive, which gets Adam kicked out. She then devises a plan to have the cool kids be nice to him, but Adam sees through it. After Adam tells Beverly he actually enjoyed having lunch in the computer lab, Beverly makes a deal with Johnny Atkins to take the blame for the cheesed drive, and gets Adam's nerdy friends back. Featured Songs: "Wait For The Beep (Crazy Calls Rap)" by Ron Carter and WDR Band, "The Heart of the Matter" by Don Henley Absent: AJ Michalka as Lainey Lewis Guest Starring: Judd Hirsch as Ben "Pop-Pop" Goldberg Notes: The episode is dedicated to "the real Mike Levy and Mike Levy".; The real Mike C. Levy and Mike Z. Levy appear in the episode as the school employees that clean the cheese out of the computer.; After having a recurring role in season 3, this is the only appearance of Judd Hirsch in season 4.
76	5	"Stefan King"	David Katzenberg	Chris Bishop	October 26, 2016	406	6.14
Adam is determined to write a novel in the vein of horror icon Stephen King, but he's at a loss for ideas until Beverly comes in the room and does her usual smothering. This inspires Adam to write about a monster called "The Veberly" who sucks the blood of children. A proud but clueless Beverly shares Adam's first few chapters with her book club, with all the members quickly realizing the monster is Beverly. Beverly then locks Adam in his room (a la the writer Paul Sheldon in Stephen King's Misery) until he rewrites the Veberly character in a nicer light. Elsewhere, Geoff Schwartz and Evy reveal they are going to the high school Halloween dance as Audrey and Audrey Jr. from Little Shop of Horrors, and Erica quickly lies that she is going with Lainey's hot cousin. While Lainey does manage to get her cousin to agree to go with Erica, he sees her with no makeup and her geeky glasses and backs out. Determined to not be shown up by Evy, Erica rents a superior Audrey Jr. costume and forces Barry to wear it and be her "date" to the dance. But Barry falls over a table at the dance and the costume head falls off, with everyone seeing that Erica went with her brother. Erica retreats to the music room in total humiliation. Soon after, Lainey and Barry ask Geoff to console Erica, and he does, singing a song with her and telling her they will always be good friends. Erica returns to the dance and has fun, not caring what anyone thinks anymore. Featured song: "Suddenly, Seymour" from Little Shop of Horrors, covered by Hayley Orrantia and Sam Lerner Guest Starring: Jennifer Irwin as Virginia Kremp, Jackie Sandler as Elaine Notes: The date at the beginning of the episode is announced as "October 29th" instead of the expected "October 26th".; The episode is dedicated to Adam's "muse Stephen King".; After having a recurring role in seasons 2 and 3, this is the only appearance of Jennifer Irwin in season 4.
77	6	"Recipe for Death II: Kiss the Cook"	Lew Schneider	Brian Hennelly	November 9, 2016	403	6.46
Inspired by action films of the 80's, especially Arnold Schwarzenegger's Commando, Adam convinces Murray to fund his own action movie, Recipe for Death , which will require $80 worth of gear to spice things up. Adam and his dad bond over the experience, but Murray starts to take his "producer" role a bit too seriously and wants to make changes, including replacing Barry as lead actor with Mr. Mellor. Adam soon nixes the project after Murray's meddling becomes unbearable, but he secretly goes to Pops for another $80 to do the movie his own way. Realizing he let his son down, Murray brings Adam a real film camera, which he borrowed from a relative who shoots bar mitzvahs. Murray, Adam, Barry and Mr. Mellor then all work together to shoot the perfect action film. Elsewhere, Erica sees Lainey in a new sweater dress, and wants one of her own. She convinces Beverly to take her to the mall by calling it a "shopping experience" they can both enjoy, with the ulterior motive of making a detour to the hip new clothing store Benetton. When they arrive, Beverly notices that the Gimbels department store is closing, which distracts her. Though Erica manages to drag Beverly to Benetton and get her to spring for the sweater dress, they are soon banned from the store after an argument when the cashier won't honor Beverly's Gimbels coupon. Back home, a furious Erica starts cutting up many of Beverly's sweaters with Lainey in an attempt to create a sweater dress, but all the efforts fail. Horrified after seeing her ruined sweaters and learning that Erica really just wanted her credit card, Beverly is despondent. Erica consoles her mother and says she really would enjoy a shopping trip...this time to Gimbels, where Beverly can use coupons on top of the closeout prices to replace many of her sweaters. Featured Song: "All I Need is a Miracle" by Mike & the Mechanics Note: The episode is dedicated to "the man who produced [Adam's] first movie... [his] dad".
78	7	"Ho-ly K.I.T.T."	Lea Thompson	Andrew Secunda	November 16, 2016	410	6.45
Adam badly wants to go to the Gimbels Thanksgiving Day Parade after learning that K.I.T.T., the intelligent car from the popular TV series Knight Rider, will be appearing, but Murray doesn't want to deal with downtown traffic and Beverly is too busy preparing the Thanksgiving meal. Murray's brother Marvin arrives for Thanksgiving, and the two bond over watching episodes of Knight Rider that Adam recorded. Later, Adam is watching the Thanksgiving Day Parade on TV with Pops when he sees Murray and Marvin in the background as K.I.T.T. passes by. Furious, Adam plots to dredge up old sibling rivalries with a Knight Rider board game, which quickly goes south when Murray and Marvin argue over who will play as the Michael Knight piece. Meanwhile, Barry tells Beverly he wants to spend Thanksgiving with Lainey, so Beverly usurps this by inviting Bill and Lainey to the Goldberg Thanksgiving. Despite Beverly telling Bill not to bring anything, he shows up with his own turkey and a deep fryer, insisting it will be better than Beverly's turkey. Adam convinces Marvin to take him to see K.I.T.T., which is being stored at the mall where Marvin works as a security guard. The two take a joyride, ending at the Goldberg driveway. Meanwhile, Bill is dropping his turkey into the fryer. The turkey is ejected as if shot out of a cannon, and lands on K.I.T.T.'s hood, doing damage. Bill realizes that Beverly must have sabotaged his turkey by re-freezing it, so he leaves with Lainey. After learning how much Thanksgiving means to Bill and Lainey since Lainey's mother left, Beverly apologizes for her behavior and pleads for the Lewises to come back. Murray and Marvin also make up, with Murray admitting he always bossed Marvin around because he thought he had to take charge with their father gone so much. Meanwhile, Erica decides to become a vegetarian but no one seems to care. In the end, it’s revealed that she was only being a vegetarian because she was looking for something to distract her from thinking about Geoff all the time. Featured Songs: "The Promise" by When in Rome, "Knight Rider Theme" by Stu Phillips Note: The episode is dedicated to "fried turkeys everywhere".
79	8	"The Greatest Musical Ever Written"	Lew Schneider	Annie Mebane	November 30, 2016	407	5.96
When Adam's drama teacher Mrs. Cinoman changes the school play from the annual production of The Wizard of Oz to the exciting new musical Phantom of the Opera, Adam and most of the student body wants to be involved, including the popular kids and Lainey. Barry is surprised that everyone is enamored with the musical and angered that Adam's part requires him to kiss Lainey. Barry becomes a stage hand in order to sabotage their intimate scene, but Mrs. Cinoman gets in the crossfire and gets hurt when a chandelier crashes on stage. The play gets cancelled since they didn't get legal permission, and Barry admits to Adam that he was surprised that Adam could succeed in a place where Barry can't. Meanwhile, Erica wants to take it easy for her senior year by blowing off hard classes, so she takes a home economics class with a bunch of football jocks who also want an "easy A". However, Beverly becomes a substitute teacher for the class, and gives Erica and jocks an 'F' for not taking cooking seriously. Principal Ball and Coach Mellor force her to change the grades and tell her that home economics is a blow-off class, exhilarating Erica and devastating Beverly. Later, Erica realizes her mom works hard at home to scrimp and save so she and Murray can pay for her college tuition. Erica then tries to prepare a home cooked meal, but it isn't easy as it looks. In the end, mother and daughter come together and make dinner for the whole family. Featured Song: "Think of Me" from The Phantom of the Opera, covered by Hayley Orrantia Guest Starring: Ana Gasteyer as Miss Cinoman, Nate Hartley as Dan Morse Note: The episode is dedicated to Adam's "high school drama teacher", Miss Cinoman.
80	9	"Globetrotters"	Richie Keen	Adam Armus	December 7, 2016	408	5.40
Murray has two tickets to a Harlem Globetrotters game and wants to take Barry, but Barry has pneumonia and cannot go. Murray is forced to take Adam, who isn't thrilled about going, but Adam's attitude quickly changes when he sees how funny the Globetrotters are. Despite their lack of athletic ability, Adam and his pals start working on their own versions of Globetrotters routines, which angers Barry because sports are "his thing". Soon, Barry makes a list of his interests and hobbies that Adam is not allowed to participate in, but Adam becomes defiant. The fight boils over into a winner-takes-all basketball game, which Barry wins much to Adam's dismay. Barry later apologizes and states that he felt threatened by Adam's newfound interest in the Globetrotters, and agrees to share it with him. Meanwhile, Beverly plans a "surprise" 50th birthday party for Murray. Knowing that Murray isn't big on parties, Beverly lets him in on the surprise so that he will be prepared to spend a night with friends and family. On the day of the event, Murray plans to take a quick nap before the party, but falls asleep for two hours, angering Beverly. Having hurt his wife, Murray later surprises Beverly by organizing a re-do of his own 50th birthday party. Featured Song: "One Moment in Time" by Whitney Houston Absent: AJ Michalka as Lainey Lewis Notes: The episode is dedicated to Adam's "dad's birthday party he never wanted" and to "The Globetrotters".; First of five season co-star appearances of Nate Hartley as classmate Dan Morse.; Only season co-star appearances of Ben Zelevansky as Dale and Sam Kindseth as David Sirota.
81	10	"Han Ukkah Solo"	Joanna Kerns	Dan Levy	December 14, 2016	409	6.20
Johnny Atkins sells Adam a rare bootleg VHS copy of the Star Wars Holiday Special, knowing that Adam is a huge fan of the Star Wars franchise. After viewing the tape, Adam is extremely disappointed, and begins to question his fandom and loyalty to other movies, picking apart ridiculous plot lines and inconsistencies. In a larger sense, Adam fears he has grown up and lost his sense of "childlike wonder", and he shares these fears with Pops. Pops tries to ease Adam's fears by taking him to see the latest George Lucas film, but it turns out to be the notorious flop Howard the Duck, leading to further disappointment. In the end, Adam finds some redeeming quality in the Star Wars Holiday Special in that it introduced the Boba Fett character, and Pops convinces him that he never should lose his youthful wonderment. Elsewhere, Erica and Barry are singing in the chorus for the school's holiday show, with Beverly expecting Erica to sing the solo for the Dreidel song, which is the only Hanukkah song included. Erica is tired of singing the song, having only done it to please Pops. The chorus doesn't want to sing the song and neither does Erica, disappointing Beverly. Beverly insists that Erica write a Hanukah song for the show, causing Barry to try and write a better song. Ms. Cinoman doesn't like either of their songs—Erica's is a blatant ripoff of "Happy Birthday" and Barry's is a historically inaccurate rap song about the Maccabees. Principal Ball says that if there is no Chanukah song, the show can't include Christmas songs either, resulting in chaos when all the Christmas lyrics are replaced with secular lyrics about mundane topics such as "We wish you a snowy Tuesday". Things only get worse when Ms. Cinoman spitefully reveals to the entire class that Beverly caused the mishap, leaving Erica and Barry embarrassed. Erica confronts Beverly and learns the shocking truth: she was lying about Pops liking the song, and had use him to manipulate her into singing the song for over a decade. Beverly reveals that she loved hearing Erica sing the song and was afraid she wouldn't do it if she asked her directly. Understanding of the incident, Erica forgives her and manages to pull off a solo singing a popular secular song, delighting her mother. Featured song: "Put a Little Love in Your Heart" by Annie Lennox and Al Green, covered by Hayley Orrantia Absent: AJ Michalka as Lainey Lewis Note: The episode is dedicated to "the holiday's most beautiful voices".
82	11	"O Captain! My Captain!"	Richie Keen	Marc Firek	January 4, 2017	412	6.73
Beverly has a one-month substitute assignment for a class that includes Barry. Inspired by the film Dead Poets Society, she tries to make a difference in changing the attitudes of her students, but they actively resist. At home, Beverly constantly grills Barry with chemistry questions, but he says he doesn't need to learn it because he plans to marry Kathy Ireland and live off her wealth. Murray takes a different tactic, convincing Barry that Beverly really has no interest in him learning because she wants to keep him at home forever. This inspires Barry to actually try to learn chemistry, and he begins to lead study sessions with the JTP. When Barry finds out that his dad lied to him, he vows to go back to the way things were, and Beverly is devastated that Barry's interest in science was fueled by his resentment of her. Murray later finds Barry hiding a physics book under his mattress. Barry admits he is now interested in science, and thinks he's found a subject he can excel at. He is ashamed, but Murray reassures him and reveals that Beverly believed in him from the start. Barry, the JTP and several classmates decide to stand on desks like from Dead Poets Society, overjoying Beverly. Elsewhere, a note is passed around Adam's class, landing in his hands when Mr. Glascott forces him to read it aloud. Adam does so, and reveals it was written by a guy who has noticed Emmy Mirsky's "blossoming" body, which embarrasses Emmy. Adam tries to convince Emmy that guys go through the same thing, especially when it comes to "shirts and skins" in gym class, but Emmy insists it's not the same. Erica assures Adam that ninth grade girls are very body-conscious, so he asks her for help in making things right with Emmy. Adam expects Erica to just write a nice apology letter for him, but she instead conspires with Mr. Mellor to make Adam a "skin for life" in gym. When Adam confronts Erica about this, Erica reveals that when she went through ninth grade, she went through the same exact thing as Emmy, but had no one to come to for support, and that Emmy does but Adam is shutting her out. Adam eventually shows his support for Emmy when he confronts two seniors (Johnny Atkins and JC Spink) who make wisecracks about Emmy's "nice rack". In return, Erica get hims out of skins and stops Adam from getting throw into a trashcan by said seniors. Absent: AJ Michalka as Lainey Lewis Notes: This is one of the only episodes in the ten-season series run that does not feature a 1980s-themed song at the end.; The episode is dedicated to "Doctor Barry Goldberg, M.D.".
83	12	"Snow Day"	Victor Nelli, Jr.	Lauren Bans	January 11, 2017	413	6.92
The Goldberg children get a day off from school due to heavy snow, and plan to spend it doing whatever they want. However, Beverly insists that Erica use the time to write her college essay and Murray orders Barry and Adam to shovel snow. Erica says she's already written an essay about a hero of hers, but won't say whom. Beverly searches Erica's room and finds the essay, titled "My Mother, My Hero". She goes overboard and wants to partake in every aspect of Erica's life. Erica retaliates by saying she will write an essay about herself, believing she has heroically escaped growing up with a "smother". This leads to a race to the mailbox and Erica destroying the first letter, devastating Beverly, who reveals that the first letter was the only proof she had that Erica still wanted her in her life. Erica assures her this isn't the case, and tells Beverly she would be lucky to grow up to be just like her mother. Meanwhile, Barry and Adam defy Murray by building a snow fort instead of shoveling the driveway. When an angry Murray gets stuck in the entrance to the fort and panics, the boys see their dad as vulnerable for the first time. They try to use this to their advantage by disobeying every order Murray gives them. Murray goes along with it, saying they will need him someday. "Someday" comes only twenty minutes later, when the boys have a mishap while doing some "tailgate sledding". The boys apologize and the family has a snowball fight on the lawn. Featured Song: "Theme from The Greatest American Hero (Believe It or Not)" by Mike Post Absent: AJ Michalka as Lainey Lewis Notes: The date at the beginning of the episode is announced as "snow day" instead of "January 11th".; The episode is dedicated to "snow day".
84	13	"Agassi"	David Katzenberg	Chris Bishop	February 8, 2017	416	6.19
Adam is upset when Chad Kremp can't devote any more time to "Chadam Productions", their movie-making venture, because he is always at tennis practice. To ensure they don’t grow apart, Adam joins the team and insists on being Chad’s doubles partner, but he is terrible at tennis. The next day, Adam is upset to learn Chad ditched him to partner with Dave Kim, and goes to self-processed "sports guru" Barry for help; Barry is thrilled, going all-out to emulate star tennis player Andre Agassi, right down to the hair and outfit; however, it is soon apparent that Barry is also an awful tennis player. Chad mocks Adam for his desire to keep making movies with him, claiming he only pretended to keep liking it because he thought Adam would overreact upon finding out he didn’t share his passion for it. Amidst his fury, Adam watches Barry flip out after a reprimand from Coach Mellor, and realizes there is another player he can channel much more accurately: John McEnroe. Barry goes all-out in his impersonation, earning respect from Mellor and inducing a meltdown for Chad, who is sent off for poor sportsmanship; he condemns Adam as he leaves. Later, Adam visits Chad to make things right, explaining that he just wanted to keep making movies with him; Chad assures him he doesn’t want to quit Chadam Productions, and will still make movies with him when time permits. Elsewhere, Valentine's Day finds the lonely Erica wallowing in self-pity after losing Geoff Schwartz to Evy Silver. With Mr. Glascott's help, Beverly holds an intervention to get the "old Erica" back, with little success. Beverly then takes Erica to a discotheque (an empty one, since the disco era is long over), and tries to get her to dance to lift her spirits, which also fails to work. Later, Erica runs into Geoff and Evy, and Evy expresses pity for how low she has sunk; this is the final straw for Erica, who reverts to her old ways invites the whole school to a "Disco Is Dead" party. Beverly tries to shut it down, but the discotheque owner beats her to it when he learns that all the patrons will be underage. Seeing Erica is miserable once again, Beverly vows to rescue both the party and her daughter's reputation. Obtaining the keys to the school, she sneaks all Erica’s party guests into the gym for a hugely successful disco party. Mr. Glascott is appalled that Beverly helped arrange an unauthorized party, but is unable to resist the disco music and joins her on the dance floor. Featured Song: "Never Surrender" by Stan Bush Absent: George Segal as Pops Guest Starring: Jacob Hopkins as Chad Kremp, Derek Miller as Mann D. Mecunda Notes: The date at the beginning of the episode is announced as "Valentine's Day" instead of the expected "February 8th".; The episode is dedicated to "Chadam".; The real Chad Kremp appears in the episode as Chad's father.
85	14	"The Spencer's Gift"	Jay Chandrasekhar	Alex Barnow	February 15, 2017	414	6.50
Barry asks Murray for money to buy a hot new boom box, but Dad says no, he must earn it. Barry and Erica are at the mall when they see a "help wanted" sign in the Spencer's Gifts store. Both apply and both get jobs. After one day working, it is clear that Barry is way more into novelty gifts than Erica and excels at talking customers into buying anything. This earns Barry a promotion, which irritates Erica, so she decides to sabotage him the next day at work. This backfires when Barry is fired for losing a bunch of bottled farts, which is not the result Erica wanted. She soon admits she was jealous of Barry and the ease with which he took to the job. Meanwhile, Barry sees that Adam already has the cool boom box, a gift from Beverly who says Adam is "special". She proclaims her schmoo doesn't need a job because he's going places with his movies. Trying to make things right with his siblings, Adam soon gets a job at the arcade in the mall. The arcade has a policy of giving a free quarter for each 'A' on a student's report card, and Adam gets bullied into dispensing quarters for a bunch of people with fake report cards, getting him quickly fired. This pleases Beverly, but Adam is not happy, saying he liked the job and wants to earn his keep like Barry and Erica. Adam then earns his job back by making a commercial for the arcade proprietor. Featured Song: "True Colors" by Cyndi Lauper Guest Starring: Chad Coleman as Leon Schmion, Parvesh Cheena as Andy Cesunda Notes: The episode is dedicated to Adam's "parents for letting [him] dream".; The real Brea Bee, who attended school with Adam, appears in the episode as Mrs. Vanica. A fictional version of her as Adam's classmate and girlfriend would later appear in seasons 7 through 10.
86	15	"So Swayze It’s Crazy"	Jay Chandrasekhar	Lacey Friedman	February 22, 2017	411	6.21
Upon learning that R. D. Robb, a boy Adam knows from the area, appeared in the movie A Christmas Story, Adam decides it's time for him to also become famous. He meets up with an agent Beverly knows and the agent definitely sees potential in Adam. As Beverly later finds out, the agent sees Adam filling a role as a nerd in Meatballs Part II, but Beverly will have none of it, insisting Adam is leading man material, a la Tom Cruise or Patrick Swayze. Beverly dumps the agent and proposes to represent Adam herself, with disastrous results. Adam later learns Beverly nixed a chance for him to be in Meatballs Part II and gets mad at her. Beverly soon grudgingly admits Adam could play a nerd, albeit a lovable one. At school, Barry decides to take on a punk persona after Lainey says she thinks the punk look is hot. Barry gets tips from a punkster named Matt Bradley, even letting Matt briefly join the JTP after the other members have no interest in going punk. But it soon becomes clear that Barry can't pull off the punk look or attitude and he ends up dressing up like a pirate. Meanwhile, Murray tries to get involved in Erica's love life after seeing her down in the dumps. He knows she likes one of her brothers' friends, but clearly doesn't know the details and sets her up with Dave Kim. Thrilled, Dave sings an embarrassing love song for Erica in the cafeteria the next day, humiliating her. Knowing her dad interfered, Erica confronts him at home, and Murray asks Pops for help to bond with Erica. Later, while trying to prove to her that he knows her better than she thinks, Murray references Erica’s love for Geoff Schwartz; as it happens, Geoff is there with Barry and overhears the whole thing. Later, Geoff confides to Erica that he's flattered she likes him, but he's happy in his relationship with Evy; Erica accepts this and lets him leave. However, just as Geoff has second thoughts, he turns around to see Erica has followed him, and the two end up kissing. Later, Murray assumes that Erica is angry with him for interfering in her life, but instead, she hugs him and thanks him for doing so. Featured Song: "Let My Love Open the Door (E. Cola Mix)" by Pete Townshend Guest Starring: Susie Essman as Edie Robb, Eddie Pepitone as Tony the Deli Guy Notes: The episode is dedicated to "Edie Robb, who inspired [Adam] to do this...", then a photo of Adam with a popped collar is shown, "and also the real R.D. Robb".; The real R. D. Robb appears in the episode as Paul Sirochman.; The featured song of this episode, which features Erica and Geoff's first kiss, would be used again in the season 8 finale when he proposes to her.
87	16	"The Kara-te Kid"	Anton Cropper	Adam F. Goldberg	March 1, 2017	415	6.17
When Adam writes a glowing review of The Karate Kid for the school newspaper, his classmates assume it was written by the other Adam Goldberg in 11th grade because he forgot to sign it with his middle initial. After finding out, Adam's namesake challenges him to a fight, and he turns to Barry for help. Since fighting isn't allowed on school grounds, Barry convinces Coach Mellor to start a karate club and brings Adam to his "sensei": Uncle Marvin. Like Mr. Miyagi, Marvin uses household chores and cleaning in place of karate techniques, but Barry and Adam eventually realize that he is quite literally making them do his chores, and go into the tournament not knowing anything. During the tournament, Beverly tells Barry to "sweep the leg" so that Adam can fake an injury and get out of fighting. However, Adam realizes he is sick of being bullied, especially after Murray gives him a pep talk about how he himself was a bully until one of his victims fought back. The two Adams confront each other in the hallway, and to Adam’s surprise, the other Adam admits he doesn't know how to fight either and was just hoping Adam would wuss out. Since they're both actors, they work together to replicate the last scene of The Karate Kid, ending by performing double crane kicks on each other. The contest is declared a tie, and they both get to keep their names. Meanwhile, after their first kiss, Erica and Geoff have begun sneaking around and stealing kisses behind Evy's back. Geoff repeatedly vows to break up with her without following through, resulting in Evy suspecting he isn’t telling her something. Geoff witnesses her confiding in Erica and reveals the truth, assuming she has learned it already, and Evy breaks things off in fury. Geoff and Erica make their relationship official, but realize their friends see them as the villains of their story, and that deep down, they know they are right. After seeing how heartbroken Evy is, Erica accepts that she doesn’t want to start a relationship with Geoff this way, and reluctantly suggests that they hold off on dating until the timing feels right. Later, Beverly, Marvin, Barry and Adam enroll for Karate classes with an instructor named Master John (Martin Kove, who coached the evil Cobra Kai team in the movie), who teaches them to fight with love, kindness and mercy. Featured Songs: "Glory of Love" by Peter Cetera, "You're the Best" by Joe Esposito Absent: AJ Michalka as Lainey Lewis Guest Starring: Oliver Cooper as The Other Adam Goldberg Notes: The episode is dedicated to Adam's "brother the Karate Kid".; The Karate Kid-themed episode uses the same font on the opening credits that was used in the movie.
88	17	"Deadheads"	Jason Blount	Adam Armus	March 8, 2017	418	5.70
Barry is resistant when Geoff, Andy, and Rob want to induct the school's resident Deadhead, Matt Bradley, into the JTP. He tries to make it as hard as possible for Matt to pass the "initiation tests", but Matt does anyway. With Barry out-voted 4 to 3 (as leader; Barry's vote counts as three) the JTP goes to the Grateful Dead concert instead of the Fat Boys, which Barry wanted. Barry then tries to get the group kicked out of the concert, but to no avail. The other JTP members chastise Barry for being selfish, causing him to quit and try to start a different posse. When the member recruitments are a disaster, Barry apologizes and asks to be back in the JTP. (The closing sequence mentions that Matt Bradley wound up being Barry's best friend after high school and becoming the fifth member of the JTP.) At home, Adam yells out the F-bomb when Pops knocks over his video camera, and Beverly hears it. Beverly starts a "swear jar" that any family member must donate to if they use a curse word. Erica laughs at this, as Beverly is the worst offender in the family, and proclaims they'll soon have enough of Mom's money in the jar for a trip to The Bahamas. Erica even finds a way to get Murray to donate whenever he calls one of his kids a "moron" because it is hurtful, so Murray pays an initial $50 to be able to call them morons without repercussions. Beverly insists that any money be used for a trip to Colonial Williamsburg, which Erica and Adam strongly oppose. As Mom and Dad put in more money, they try to even things up by creating a "Baditude" jar for any time Erica says something sarcastic and condescending, plus an "Adam" jar for whenever Adam says something nerdy or refers to a science fiction movie. All-out "jar wars" ensue, and money starts going from jar to jar. Realizing they can't do anything other than be themselves, the group ceases the jar wars, while Erica and Adam relent and agree that another trip to Colonial Williamsburg won't be so bad. Featured Song: "Touch of Grey" by Grateful Dead Absent: AJ Michalka as Lainey Lewis Notes: The episode is dedicated to "the real Matt Bradley".; First of two season co-star appearances of Jackie Radinsky as classmate Sergei Tarbokomous.
89	18	"Baré"	Jay Chandrasekhar	Steve Basilone	March 15, 2017	419	5.42
After Lainey announces she's been accepted by a fashion design school in Savannah, Georgia, Barry panics over the decision to follow his dream of being a doctor or follow his heart and stay with Lainey. He first considers fast-tracking his medical schooling, a la Doogie Howser, which Beverly surprisingly says is impossible. Barry then tries to take on the persona of fashion designer Baré, with the hopes of following Lainey to Georgia, and even presents a fashion show in the Goldberg home using the JTP as models. But Beverly has secretly consulted with Lainey, convincing her to do what is best for Barry and allow him to pursue a medical career, even if it means their relationship might end. Meanwhile, Erica and Adam become enraged that Murray seems to shower his dog Lucky with more love and attention than he does his kids. Erica sets out to prove it, but in cornering her dad with the information, he breaks out in a cry-whisper and says he is upset that she will be leaving for college soon. He remembers that when Erica was a little girl, she would always run into his arms when he came home from work, but now only Lucky does so. Erica tries to console her dad by saying she will look at colleges near Philadelphia, but Murray insists she needs to be on her own, and says he will support her efforts to attend the University of Miami. Featured Song: "This is the Time" by Billy Joel Note: The episode is dedicated "in loving memory of Lucky".
90	19	"A Night to Remember"	Lew Schneider	Chris Bishop	March 29, 2017	420	6.07
With prom night approaching, Erica and Geoff badly want to go together but are still trying to take things slow on resuming their relationship. When Barry learns that Lainey won’t to go to prom if Erica is staying at home, Barry convinces Geoff to act on his feelings to save his own prom plans. However, Geoff fails to reach Erica before she is asked to prom by Ruben Amaro Jr. Erica then tries to break it off so she can go with Geoff, only to learn Carla asked him to go with her to make Johnny Atkins jealous. A series of back-and-forth agreements and refusals ensues between Erica, Geoff and their prom dates, with the two eventually deciding to stick to their original dates so they will at least be there together. Not long into prom, they admit that they won’t truly enjoy themselves if they are with other people, and ultimately ditch their dates to officially be there as a couple. Meanwhile, despite Barry's pleas, Lainey admits that the real reason she doesn’t want to go to prom is because it is a painful reminder that their time together is getting shorter, and they spend the night having fun alone together instead. Elsewhere, Adam falls hard for a junior named Jackie (Rowan Blanchard) when she appears to be as much into sci-fi/fantasy as he is. But a problem arises when Adam learns Jackie is a huge fan of The Lord of the Rings which he has never read. Adam is forced to read the CliffsNotes version of the book to converse with Jackie, but his lie is soon discovered. Featured Song: "Time After Time" by Cyndi Lauper Notes: The date at the beginning of the episode is announced as "prom season" instead of "March 29th".; The episode is dedicated to Adam's "first prom date".; The real Jackie Geary appears in the episode as Jackie's mother.
91	20	"The Dynamic Duo"	Kevin Smith	Andrew Secunda	April 5, 2017	417	5.63
Murray is dead set on having Erica attend his alma mater, Penn State University, and sets up an admissions interview for his daughter. Erica intentionally bombs the interview at Penn State, so her parents would have no choice but to approve her preferred college, Carnegie Mellon University. But Erica soon receives a rejection letter from Carnegie Mellon, making Penn State her only option left. Beverly tries to fix the mistake using Murray's history as a Penn State alumnus, but she and Erica soon learn that he never graduated from Penn State, falling one credit short. Furious at her father's hypocrisy, Erica tries to fulfill her dream of becoming famous by singing on the street in the rain. Murray visits and apologizes for being a hypocrite, and they make up. Meanwhile, Adam and Pops make a date to see the new Batman movie starring Michael Keaton and Jack Nicholson. Barry badly wants to be included, but when they get to the theater, Pops and Adam take two seats in a row with no other seats available, forcing Barry to sit way up front by himself. Adam loves the movie, but Pops isn't thrilled because it isn't like the old Batman TV series starring Adam West. Seizing the opportunity, Barry tries to drive a wedge between Adam and Pops' friendship by taping Adam badmouthing the old Batman series and locking Adam in his room to prevent him from stopping him. When Barry shows Pops the video however, Pops sees it as an obvious ploy for his attention. Upset that his plan failed, Barry complains that Adam monopolizes all of Pops' time, and he always feels left out. To make it up, Adam and Pops ask Barry to play a villain in a Batman movie they are creating. Featured Song: "Africa" by Toto Absent: AJ Michalka as Lainey Lewis Guest Starring: David Hornsby as Kyle Schnitz Note: The episode is dedicated to "all the 80's superheroes".
92	21	"Fonzie Scheme"	Jude Weng	Matt Mira & Erik Weiner	April 26, 2017	421	5.23
Murray is given the honor of being named businessman of the year. When Beverly sees what he listed as his accomplishments, she is embarrassed and refuses to let anyone see it. While Adam, Barry, and Erica wait for the venue to close, a golfer mistakes Barry for a caddy. Barry decides to do wild and crazy stunts with it. Adams asks Erica what he should do. Erica says she's going off to college, so she won't act as the voice of reason. The golf cart ends up in the middle of the lake, causing Barry to start a "Ponzi Scheme" by calling it a "Fonzie scheme", mistaking it for the character Arthur Fonzarelli (played by Henry Winkler) in Happy Days. By stealing golf carts and replacing the previous. Barry ends up getting pinned under the second one, while Adam panics. Erica shows up with the JTP and fixes the problem. She tells Adam that while she may be moving away, she will always be his big sister. Meanwhile, Murray decides to start couponing, in order to impress Beverly. She gets mad at his shopping style, and he says he only did this to make her realize that he was the same man she married. Beverly realized how much she hurt her husband, and says that she never wanted to hurt his feeling, and shows that she added to his accomplishments of all the things he does as a Dad. Featured Song: "99 Luftballons" by Nena Absent: AJ Michalka as Lainey Lewis Note: The episode is dedicated to "our dumb decisions from childhood".
93	22	"The Day After the Day After"	Jay Chandrasekhar	Alex Barnow	May 3, 2017	422	5.16
Barry, Lainey and the JTP watch The Day After with Murray, and fearing a nuclear war. Barry tries to create a bunker, but Murray crushes Barry's dreams by becoming the new leader of the bunker and preventing Barry from building his own. After realizing how afraid Barry is, Murray lets on that he too is afraid, and there is nothing they can do but live their lives here and now. Meanwhile, Erica and Adam fight for Beverly's affections with Mother's Day approaching. Each has an alternative agenda: Erica wants to go to Emory University in Georgia, while Adam wants to go with Jackie to the beach. Erica asks first and gets to go to the college of her dreams, leading Beverly to shun Adam in favor of her, Adam sabotages it by making a video of Erica disappearing, and not being a part of the family, leading a heartbroken Beverly revokes her decision; later, Erica tells Adam off in front of Jackie, resulting in both siding against him. Adam fixes the situation, causing him to miss out on going to the beach with Jackie, but she in turn gives him a second kiss. Featured Song: "Wind Beneath My Wings" by Bette Midler Guest Starring: Steve Berg as Mailman Note: The episode is dedicated to "our cheesy Mother's Day gifts".
94	23	"Jedi Master Adam Skywalker"	Lew Schneider	Dan Levy	May 10, 2017	423	5.22
Barry and Erica both try to get recognition for something special in the yearbook, particularly battling for "cutest couple" (Barry-Lainey and Erica-Geoff). But their pursuits have to go through Adam, who is now on the yearbook committee with Jackie, and Adam uses this to his benefit by creating a list of demands for his siblings. When Erica and Barry get tired of calling their brother "Jedi Master Adam Skywalker" and doing his chores, they each try to get to his computer and make changes, but Adam catches them. In the battle over a floppy disk with all of the yearbook verbiage, Barry's fingers touch the surface of the disk, rendering it unreadable and causing Jackie to get angry with Adam. Meanwhile, Murray's brother Marvin arrives looking for another handout. Beverly insists that Murray hire him at the furniture store, but this leads to an argument on Marvin's first day and Murray fires him. Beverly later discovers that Marvin is living in his car. In a heart-to-heart, Marvin complains that Murray always treated him like a little kid. Erica and Barry see that they are treating Adam the same way. Murray lets Marvin live in the basement and re-hires him, while Erica and Barry sing a song to recognize Adam as a grown-up. Featured Song: "Lean On Me" by Club Nouveau Notes: This episode has the alternate title "Best Handsome" in syndication.; The episode is dedicated to Adam's "dad's baby brother".
95	24	"Graduation Day"	Kevin Smith	Matthew Edsall & Hans Rodionoff	May 17, 2017	424	5.27
Erica is growing tired of Beverly being sappy and nostalgic as her graduation day approaches, but Geoff helps her realize what a fantastic mom she has. Barry and Lainey make plans for a fun summer together before she heads off to college in Georgia. At the graduation ceremony, Barry overhears Bill Lewis say that Lainey is leaving in a few days, not a few months, causing Barry to confront Lainey on stage. They get into a fight and later, mutually realize their relationship has come to an end. When Erica has her turn, she refuses to accept her diploma as she's now realizing how much she will miss Beverly, leading to Principal Ball chasing her through the auditorium. Beverly is ecstatic that Erica wants to stay, but Murray tells her that he would rather she leave for four years than shelter her for the rest of her life. Realizing that Erica needs to go out into the world and experience life, Beverly tells Erica she needs to go to college, and tearfully tells her that she is going to change the world. Meanwhile, Adam and Jackie make plans to see Police Academy 5: Assignment Miami Beach, and call each other boyfriend/girlfriend for the first time. Things become complicated when Dana Caldwell shows up at the movie theater, saying she's home for the summer. Adam doesn't know what to do, so he panics and runs away. Adam ends up seeing the movie with Dana and attempts to tell her he's with Jackie now, but it turns out he misinterpreted Dana's reason for looking him up. When Adam tells Jackie that Dana is just a part of his past, he learns that Jackie used to date Ruben Amaro Jr., making him worry. Adam later goes to Police Academy 5 with Barry and spots Jackie sitting alone. He sits next to her and the two patch things up. Featured Song: "Making Love Out of Nothing at All" by Air Supply Notes: The episode is dedicated to Adam's "real family".; This is the last appearance of Dana Caldwell until she returns in season 7.

== Ratings ==
Viewership and ratings per episode of The Goldbergs season 4
No.	Title	Air date	Rating/share (18–49)	Viewers (millions)	DVR (18–49)	DVR viewers (millions)	Total (18–49)	Total viewers (millions)
1	"Breakfast Club"	September 21, 2016	2.0/8	6.90	0.9	—N/a	2.9	—N/a
2	"I Heart Video Dating"	September 28, 2016	1.9/7	6.58	0.9	—N/a	2.8	—N/a
3	"George! George Glass!"	October 5, 2016	1.8/7	6.23	0.8	—N/a	2.6	—N/a
4	"Crazy Calls"	October 12, 2016	1.9/7	6.47	—N/a	—N/a	—N/a	—N/a
5	"Stefan King"	October 26, 2016	1.8/7	6.14	0.8	—N/a	2.6	—N/a
6	"Recipe for Death II: Kiss the Cook"	November 9, 2016	2.0/7	6.46	0.7	—N/a	2.7	—N/a
7	"Ho-ly K.I.T.T."	November 16, 2016	1.9/7	6.45	0.7	—N/a	2.6	—N/a
8	"The Greatest Musical Ever Written"	November 30, 2016	1.7/6	5.96	0.7	—N/a	2.4	—N/a
9	"Globetrotters"	December 7, 2016	1.5/5	5.40	0.8	—N/a	2.3	—N/a
10	"Han Ukkah Solo"	December 14, 2016	1.7/6	6.20	0.8	1.80	2.5	8.01
11	"O Captain! My Captain!"	January 4, 2017	1.9/7	6.73	0.8	—N/a	2.7	—N/a
12	"Snow Day"	January 11, 2017	2.0/7	6.92	0.7	—N/a	2.7	—N/a
13	"Agassi"	February 8, 2017	1.8/7	6.19	0.8	—N/a	2.6	—N/a
14	"The Spencer's Gift"	February 15, 2017	1.8/7	6.50	0.7	—N/a	2.5	—N/a
15	"So Swayze It’s Crazy"	February 22, 2017	1.8/7	6.21	0.7	—N/a	2.5	—N/a
16	"The Kara-te Kid"	March 1, 2017	1.8/7	6.17	TBD	TBD	TBD	TBD
17	"Deadheads"	March 8, 2017	1.7/6	5.70	0.7	—N/a	2.4	—N/a
18	"Baré"	March 15, 2017	1.5/6	5.42	0.7	—N/a	2.2	—N/a
19	"A Night to Remember"	March 29, 2017	1.7/7	6.07	TBD	TBD	TBD	TBD
20	"The Dynamic Duo"	April 5, 2017	1.6/6	5.63	TBD	TBD	TBD	TBD
21	"Fonzie Scheme"	April 26, 2017	1.7/6	5.23	TBD	TBD	TBD	TBD
22	"The Day After the Day After"	May 3, 2017	1.6/6	5.16	TBD	TBD	TBD	TBD
23	"Jedi Master Adam Skywalker"	May 10, 2017	1.3/6	5.22	TBD	TBD	TBD	TBD
24	"Graduation Day"	May 17, 2017	1.4/6	5.27	TBD	TBD	TBD	TBD
