= Brendle =

Brendle is a surname. Notable people with the surname include:

- Simon Brendle (born 1981), German mathematician
- Tara E. Brendle (fl. from 1995), American mathematician
- Tiago Brendle (born 1985), Brazilian volleyball player

== See also ==
- Brandel, Brändle, Breindel, Brendel, Brendelia, Brendl, Brendle, Brentel, Brundle, Prendel
- Brendle's, a defunct retail company of the United States
