= Georg Egloff =

American film music composer (born 1963)

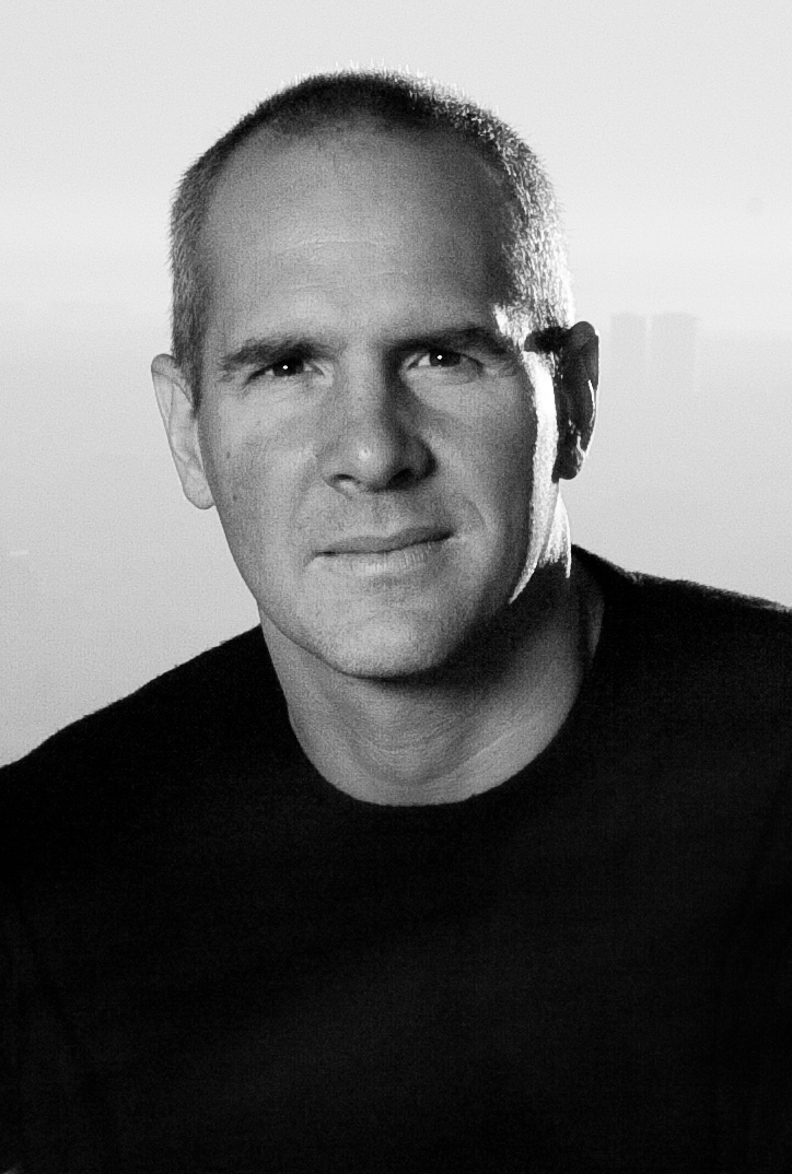
- Egloff in 2007
- Born: Georg Brandl Egloff; February 16, 1963 (age 63); Monterey, California, U.S.
- Occupations: Producer, composer
- Years active: 1994–present
- Spouse: Laura Shanahan (m. 1999; died 2014)
- Children: 2
- Musical career
- Genres: Film music; theme music; TV scores; commercial scores
- Instruments: Piano; keyboards
- Website: egloffmusic.com

Georg Brandl Egloff is an American producer and composer of music for film, television, radio, and commercials. He has composed music for Shameless, The Goldbergs, The West Wing, and A&E Biography, and is credited with writing the station ID music for the FX channel and the Hallmark Channel. He wrote the main theme music for This I Believe series on All Things Considered and Morning Edition, and composes and produces music for Milk Street Radio and America's Test Kitchen (PBS and NPR).

== Early life ==
Georg Brandl Egloff was born in Monterey, California to David and Susan Egloff. He grew up in Oberlin, Ohio. While still in high school, he studied composition, electronic music, and jazz piano at the Oberlin Conservatory of Music. He attended the Berklee College of Music in Boston and received a bachelor's degree in performance and composition in 1986.

== Music career ==
Egloff moved to New York City in 1986, where he performed as a jazz pianist in Manhattan. He served as the Tuesday night pianist at the Village Gate club on Bleecker Street. During that period, he performed at The Village Vanguard, the Blue Note, Chicago Blues, Zanzibar, the Knitting Factory, and Sweet Basil. He worked with many jazz and blues artists including Ruth Brown and Linda Hopkins.

In the 1990s, Egloff began working in rock and pop music venues with singers including Jeff Buckley, Joan Osborne, Ronnie Spector and Johnny Thunders. He recorded as a session keyboardist on many projects, including work for producers Phil Ramone and Frank Filipetti, and recorded a version of "My Way" for the Frank Sinatra Duets series.

He scored his first short film, The Anniversary, directed by Noah Kline in 1991.

== Film and television music ==
In 1994, Egloff was hired to write music for the A&E Biography episode on Hillary Clinton, which led to work on 22 more episodes for the popular series. Soon he was writing music for other television documentaries, independent and short films, national commercials, and live events. He continues composing music for television, film, radio, commercials, podcasts, and other media.

He has written for ER, The West Wing, Pan Am, Third Watch, Shameless, and various programs airing on HBO, Showtime, and Lifetime Television. His film work includes The Company Men, The Big Time, The Babymakers, and The Terminal.

In 2004, Egloff appeared in an episode of The West Wing playing a Hammond organ with James Taylor.

=== Filmography ===
Year	Title	Role	Production
2020	Shameless	Composer, additional music	Showtime
2019	The Magicians	Composer, additional music	Syfy
2019	Wayne	Composer, additional music	YouTube Premium
2018	American Woman	Composer, additional music	Paramount Network
2018	Super Troopers 2	Composer, arranger	Fox Searchlight Pictures
2018	Shameless	Composer, additional music	Showtime
2016	The Goldbergs	Composer, additional music	ABC
2016	Shameless	Composer, additional music	Showtime
2016	Spirit Lake Cycles	Composer	Documentary
2014	Shameless	Composer, additional music	Showtime
2013	Under the Dome	Composer, additional music	CBS
2013	BlacK Kat	Composer	Documentary
2012	The Babymakers	Composer, additional music	Blumhouse Productions
2012	Shameless	Composer, additional music	Showtime
2012	Little Monsters	Composer	VCI Entertainment
2011	Pan Am	Composer, additional music	ABC
2011	The Lying Game	Composer, additional music	Warner Horizon Television
2010	The Company Men	Composer, additional music	NBC
2009	Southland	Composer, additional music	NBC
2009	ER	Music producer, composer, additional music	Warner Bros. Television
2009	Spooner	Composer, additional music	Super Crispy Entertainment
2009	All Ages Night	Composer, additional music	Freedom Girl Productions
2008	Cold Case	Composer	CBS
2006	Studio 60 on the Sunset Strip	Composer, additional music	Warner Brothers Television
2003	The West Wing	Actor, musician (duet with James Taylor)	NBC
2003	The West Wing	Additional composer	NBC
2002	The Big Time	Composer, additional music	TNT
2002	Studio Bob (TV series)	Composer	Brian Cox
2002	Over My Dead Body (short)	Composer	Arie Posin
2001	The Jimmy Show	Composer, additional music	Next Wednesday Productions
2000	Citizen Baines	Composer, additional music	Warner Brothers Television
2000	Prince of Central Park	Composer, additional music	Lorimar Productions
2000	Are You Cinderella (short)	Composer	Charles Hall
1999	Third Watch	Composer, additional music	NBC
1999	Providence	Composer, additional music	NBC
1997	Daisy Feldman's New York (short)	Composer	Amy Geltman
1997	Prix Fixe (short)	Composer	Other Pictures
1996	Intimate Portrait: Doris Duke	Composer	Lifetime
1996	The O.J. Simpson Trial: Beyond Black & White	Composer	ABC
1995	Intimate Portrait: Katharine Hepburn	Composer	Lifetime
1995 - 1999	Biography (19 episodes)	Composer	A&E
