= Brandts Buys =

Brandts Buys or Brandts Buijs is the surname of a dynasty of Dutch musicians:

- Cornelis Buys (1757–1831), father of Cornelis Alijander
- Cornelis Alijander Brandts Buys (1812–1890), father of Marius, Ludwig and Henri
- Marius Adrianus Brandts Buys (1840–1911), father of Marius Adrianus and Jan below
- Ludwig Felix (Willem Cornelis) Brandts Buys (1847–1917), father of Johann Sebastian
- Henri (François Robert) Brandts Buys (1850–1905),
- Johann Sebastian (1879–1939),
- Jan Willem Frans Brandts Buys (1868–1933),
- Marius Adrianus Brandts Buys (1874–1944), father of Hans
- Hans or Johann Sebastian Brandts Buys (1905–1959)
- Anna Brandts Buys-van Zijp, sculptor and co-author with Johann Sebastian (1879–1939) of a monograph on music in Madura

== Sources ==
- Sadie, Stanley; Tyrrell, John, eds. (2001). "Brandts Buys". The New Grove Dictionary of Music and Musicians (2nd ed.). London: Macmillan Publishers. ISBN 978-1-56159-239-5.
