= Reginald Brindle =

English cricketer

Reginald Gordon Brindle (3 October 1925 – 16 March 1998) was an English cricketer who played first-class cricket for Warwickshire in a single match in 1949. He was a right-handed middle-order batsman. He was born at Warrington, then in Lancashire and died at Newton-le-Willows, Lancashire.

Brindle played for Warwickshire's second eleven in 1948 and 1949 and his only experience of first-class cricket came in a match against Combined Services in 1949 where the Warwickshire side was composed largely of second-team players; he made 42 and 32 in his two innings, but did not rate a second chance and disappeared from county cricket at the end of the same season.
