= Leif Brendel =

Norwegian organizational leader

Leif Abrahamsen Brendel (16 June 1903 – 17 November 1972) was a Norwegian organizational leader.

He was born in Kristiania as a son of pharmacist Johnny Abrahamsen Brendel (1880–1947) and Dagny Mortensen (1877–1930). In 1932 he married Martha Brock Utne, a daughter of Gerhard Christoffer Brock Utne (1868–1933) and Lyvina Preus (1868–1959).

He finished his secondary education in 1921, and graduated from the Royal Frederick University with the cand.oecon. degree in 1923 and the cand.jur. degree in 1929. In 1929 he was the deputy leader of the Norwegian Students' Society, and he held positions in the Norwegian Student Choral Society from 1925 to 1927 and 1930 to 1934.

He spent his career in professional associations, as secretary-general and journal editor. He was the secretary of the Norwegian Watchmakers Association from 1924 to 1946, and also edited its journal. In the Norwegian Pharmacy Association he was a secretary from 1925 to 1939 and secretary-general from 1940 to 1968. He edited their journal in the same period, and was the secretary-general of the Norwegian Specialized Press Association from 1932 to 1972. He edited the book Norges apotek og deres innehavere for many years. He died in November 1972.
