= Brandel =

Brandel is a given name and surname. Notable people and characters with the name include:

== People ==
- Brandel Chamblee (born 1962), American professional golfer and writer
- Anna Maria Brandel (1725–1799), Swedish businesswoman
- Blake Brandel (born 1997), American professional football player
- Konstanty Brandel (1880–1970), Polish artist
- Marc Brandel (1919–1994), English writer
- Torsten Brandel (1912–1989), Swedish diplomat
- Terry Place-Brandel (born 1957), German volleyball player

== Fictional characters ==
- Annina Brandel, Bulgarian refugee in the film Casablanca (1942)
- Alexander Brandel, a Polish-Jewish leader in the book Mila 18 (1961) by Leon Uris

== See also ==
- Brandel, Breindel, Brendel, Brendelia, Brendl, Brendle, Brentel, Prendel
