= 761 Brendelia =

Minor planet and Koronis family asteroid

Discovery
- Discovered by: Franz Kaiser
- Discovery site: Heidelberg
- Discovery date: 8 September 1913

Designations
- Alternative designations: 1913 SO

Orbital characteristics
- Epoch 31 July 2016 (JD 2457600.5)
- Uncertainty parameter 0
- Observation arc: 97.40 yr (35574 d)
- Aphelion: 3.0488 AU (456.09 Gm)
- Perihelion: 2.6751 AU (400.19 Gm)
- Semi-major axis: 2.8619 AU (428.13 Gm)
- Eccentricity: 0.065297
- Orbital period (sidereal): 4.842 yr (1,768.4 d)
- Mean anomaly: 114.79°
- Mean motion: 0° 12^{m} 12.852^{s} / day
- Inclination: 2.1605°
- Longitude of ascending node: 23.830°
- Argument of perihelion: 298.232°
- Known satellites: 1
- Earth MOID: 1.66272 AU (248.739 Gm)
- Jupiter MOID: 2.15087 AU (321.766 Gm)
- T_{Jupiter}: 3.297

Physical characteristics
- Dimensions: 14.7 km each component 20.8±0.3 km combined
- Synodic rotation period: 57.96 h (2.415 d)
- Spectral type: SC
- Absolute magnitude (H): 10.83

761 Brendelia is a binary asteroid orbiting the Sun that was discovered by German astronomer Franz Kaiser on 8 September 1913, and named after Otto Rudolf Martin Brendel. It is orbiting at a distance of 2.8619 AU from the Sun with a period of 4.842 yr and an orbital eccentricity of 0.065297. The orbital plane is inclined at an angle of 2.16° to the plane of the ecliptic.

This is a member of the dynamic Koronis family of asteroids that most likely formed as the result of a collisional breakup of a parent body. It is an SC-type asteroid that is spinning with a period of 58.00±0.02 h. Its two components are equal in size, to within measurement uncertainties.
