= Eric Breindel =

American newspaper writer/editor (1955–1998)

Eric Marc Breindel
- Born: New York, US
- Died: New York, US, 1998
- Occupation: Neoconservative writer

Eric Marc Breindel was an American neoconservative writer and former editorial page editor of the New York Post.

== Early life ==
Breindel grew up in an upper-middle class Jewish family in New York. His parents were refugees of Hitler's Europe, which likely influenced his views on totalitarian government and fueled his support of Zionism and outspoken hatred of communism.

He attended Phillips Exeter, Harvard College, and Harvard Law School. At Harvard, he developed relationships with high-profile professors as well as David and Bobby Kennedy.

== Career ==
Early in his career, Breindel pursued work in government, as his classmates at Harvard had expected him to. At the age of 27, he went to work as Senator Moynihan's aide on the Senate Intelligence Committee. Shortly into the job, however, he was arrested for buying heroin from an undercover police officer in Washington, D.C., ending any hope of a career in government or politics.

While he was still serving out his year's probation, he wrote for The New Republic and then took a research position on the PBS show American Interests. During this time, he started a relationship with Tamar Jacoby, the deputy editor of The New York Times' op-ed section. With her help and several recommendations, including one from Norman Podhoretz, he landed a job heading the editorial page of the New York Daily News.

Breindel contributed articles to such publications as Commentary, National Review, The New Republic, The Weekly Standard, The American Enterprise, and The American Spectator.

He began working at the Post's editorial page in 1986, where he immediately began making friends and enemies. He played a pivotal role in New York's 1993 mayoral race. He was the key to securing Rudy Giuliani's endorsement by the New York Post, despite Rupert Murdoch's initial intent to support the Conservative Party candidate George Marlin. The endorsement and subsequent editorials proved crucial in a race which came down to a handful of votes.

Breindel criticized Patrick J. Buchanan's anti-Israel statements and "for doubting the authenticity of some elements of the Holocaust," branding Buchanan an anti-Semite.

During the last year of his life, Breindel worked as a senior vice president of News Corporation and the host of Fox News Watch on the Fox News Channel. He also continued writing his weekly column at the Post.

== Death ==
Michael Wolff in his book The Man Who Owns The News: Inside The Secret World Of Rupert Murdoch, claims Breindel, who died of liver failure, having suffered from health problems throughout adulthood, had AIDS, though he provides no sources or any other information to confirm this.

Breindel died at the age of 42. His funeral featured eulogies by such notable figures as New York City mayor Rudy Giuliani, Governor George Pataki, Senator Daniel Patrick Moynihan, Senator Al D'Amato, Rupert Murdoch, Henry Kissinger, Robert F. Kennedy, Jr., Norman Podhoretz, Andrew Cuomo, former New York City mayor Ed Koch and Martin Peretz.

== Legacy ==
The Eric Breindel Foundation carries his name.

In 1988, Spy magazine ran a feature that depicted Breindel as a ruthlessly career-driven opportunist whose career was effectively ended by his drug bust. The article was met with criticism from its readers.

In 1999, the Eric Breindel Award for Excellence in Opinion Journalism was established in his memory, sponsored by Fox News, the New York Post and The Wall Street Journal.

Breindel was co-author of a book on the Venona project, which was published after his death.

== Family ==
He was survived by his parents, both Holocaust survivors, and his sister.

== Publications ==
Books

- The Venona Secrets: Exposing Soviet Espionage and America's Traitors, with Herbert Romerstein. Washington, D.C.: Regnery (2001). ISBN 978-0895262257.

Articles

- "The Population Factor in the Middle East," with Nick Eberstadt. International Security, vol. 3, no. 4 (Spring 1979), pp. 190–196. doi:10.2307/2626767. JSTOR 2626767.
- "Soviet Has "Empire" Dilemma." International Journal on World Peace, vol. 5, no. 3 (July/Sep. 1988). doi:10.2307/20751275. JSTOR 20751275.
