= Pavel Brendl =

Czech ice hockey player (born 1981)

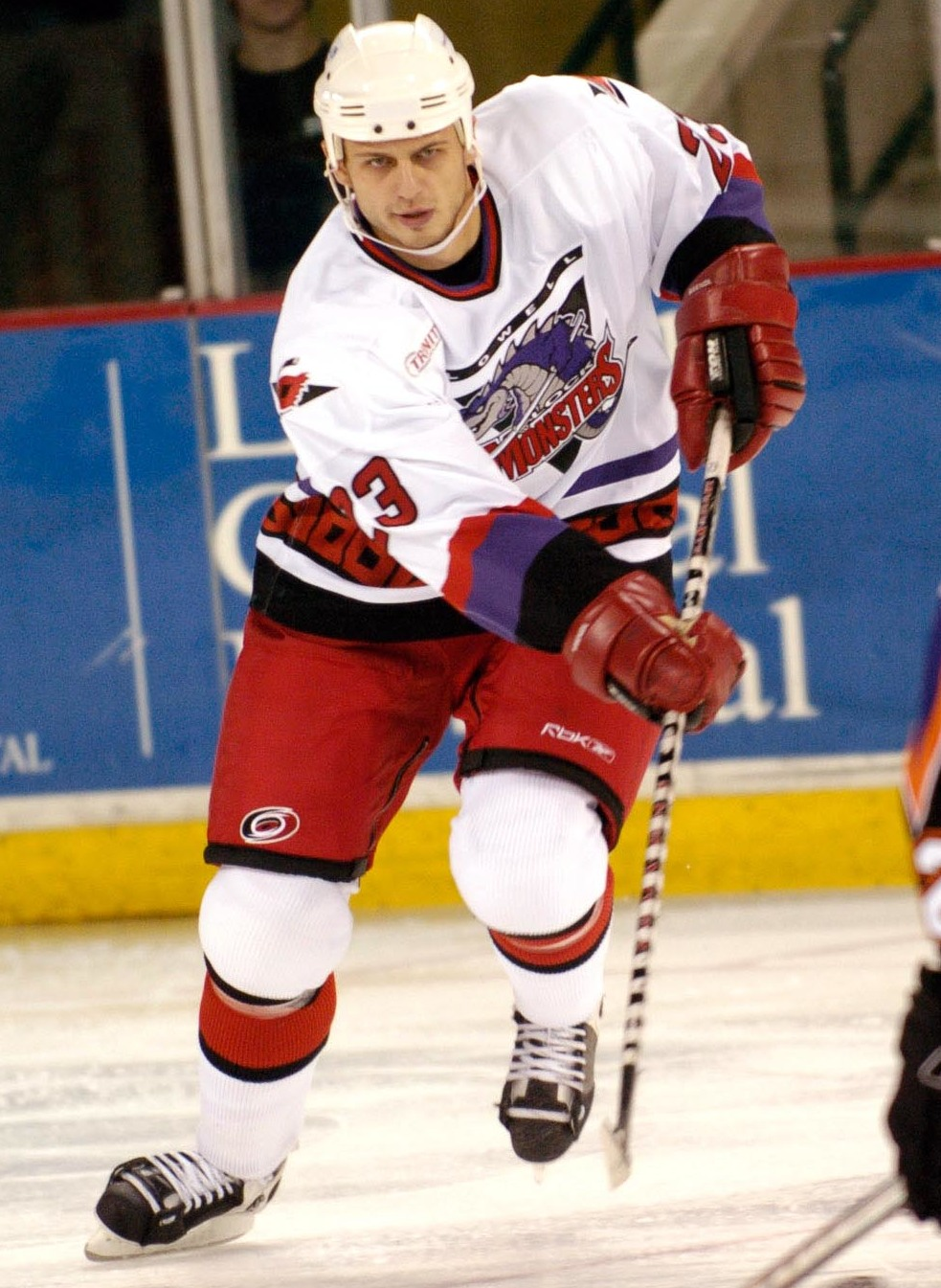
- Brendl with the Lowell Lock Monsters in 2005
- Born: March 23, 1981 (age 45) Opočno, Czech SR, Czechoslovakia
- Height: 6 ft 1 in (185 cm)
- Weight: 204 lb (93 kg; 14 st 8 lb)
- Position: Right wing
- Shot: Right
- Played for: Philadelphia Flyers; Carolina Hurricanes; Oceláři Třinec; Phoenix Coyotes; Mora IK; Brynäs IF; Torpedo Nizhny Novgorod; KalPa; HC Neftekhimik Nizhnekamsk; HC Pardubice; Rapperswil-Jona Lakers; HC Kometa Brno; HK 36 Skalica; HKM Zvolen
- NHL draft: 4th overall, 1999; New York Rangers
- Playing career: 2001–2016

Pavel Brendl (born March 23, 1981) is a Czech former professional ice hockey forward who last played for the HKM Zvolen in the Slovak Extraliga. He played in the National Hockey League with the Philadelphia Flyers, Carolina Hurricanes and Phoenix Coyotes.

== Playing career ==
Brendl was a highly rated junior star with the Calgary Hitmen of the Western Hockey League, winning numerous awards and making the all-star team of the 1999 Memorial Cup. This led to him being drafted fourth overall in the 1999 NHL entry draft by the New York Rangers. However, Brendl's talent never translated to stardom at the NHL level, where he managed only 22 points in 78 career games with the Philadelphia Flyers, Carolina Hurricanes, and Phoenix Coyotes. On August 20, 2001, he was traded by the Rangers to Philadelphia as part of a package which saw Eric Lindros go to New York.

In 2006, Brendl joined the Swedish Elitserien team Mora IK for which he scored the most goals in the Elitserien during the regular season. After one season with the team he signed a three-year contract with Brynäs IF, also in Elitserien. Brynäs regards the signing of Brendl as one of the club's biggest and most spectacular signings in the recent history of the club. In June, 2008, Brendl signed with the Russian team Torpedo Nizhny Novgorod in the Kontinental Hockey League. In the inaugural season of the KHL, Brendl led the league in scoring with 35 goals (with another Czech forward Jan Marek).

In 2010, Brendl signed with the KalPa of the SM-liiga.

Brendl is often considered to be a notable draft bust due to his high draft selection and his inability to transition his high-scoring junior career to the NHL level. Although compared to Mike Bossy by scouts for his scoring prowess before being drafted, Brendl only scored 11 goals in 78 NHL games. Brendl's lack of work ethic has been cited as a primary reason why his game never transitioned to the NHL level, being considered a "one-dimension" offensive player and not adapting to the exercise or defensive requirements of the league. Following the conclusion of his playing career, Brendl admitted in an essay that coaches treating him as a one-dimensional player who was only capable of playing in offensive situations made him lose motivation in his hockey career shortly after being drafted, and blamed a combination of poor personal decisions and poor coaching on why his NHL career did not work out, but rejects the "bust" label given his lengthy overseas career.

== Career statistics ==
=== Regular season and playoffs ===
			Regular season					Playoffs
Season	Team	League	GP	G	A	Pts	PIM	GP	G	A	Pts	PIM
1997–98	HC MBL Olomouc	CZE U20	38	29	23	52	—	—	—	—	—	—
1997–98	HC MBL Olomouc	CZE.2	12	1	1	2	—	—	—	—	—	—
1998–99	Calgary Hitmen	WHL	68	73	61	134	40	20	21	25	46	18
1998–99	Calgary Hitmen	MC	—	—	—	—	—	4	4	3	7	2
1999–2000	Calgary Hitmen	WHL	61	59	52	111	94	10	7	12	19	8
1999–2000	Hartford Wolf Pack	AHL	—	—	—	—	—	2	0	0	0	0
2000–01	Calgary Hitmen	WHL	49	40	35	75	66	10	6	7	13	6
2001–02	Philadelphia Flyers	NHL	8	1	0	1	2	2	0	0	0	0
2001–02	Philadelphia Phantoms	AHL	64	15	22	37	22	5	4	1	5	0
2002–03	Philadelphia Flyers	NHL	42	5	7	12	4	—	—	—	—	—
2002–03	Carolina Hurricanes	NHL	8	0	1	1	2	—	—	—	—	—
2003–04	Lowell Lock Monsters	AHL	33	17	16	33	34	—	—	—	—	—
2003–04	Carolina Hurricanes	NHL	18	5	3	8	8	—	—	—	—	—
2004–05	HC Thurgau	CHE.2	4	3	0	3	4	—	—	—	—	—
2004–05	HC Oceláři Třinec	ELH	2	0	0	0	0	—	—	—	—	—
2004–05	HC Olomouc	CZE.2	2	0	0	0	0	—	—	—	—	—
2004–05	Jokipojat	FIN.2	21	9	10	19	48	—	—	—	—	—
2005–06	Lowell Lock Monsters	AHL	25	6	7	13	10	—	—	—	—	—
2005–06	San Antonio Rampage	AHL	38	13	11	24	8	—	—	—	—	—
2005–06	Phoenix Coyotes	NHL	2	0	0	0	0	—	—	—	—	—
2006–07	Mora IK	SEL	54	34	23	57	34	4	1	1	2	16
2007–08	Brynäs IF	SEL	54	31	24	55	48	—	—	—	—	—
2008–09	Torpedo Nizhny Novgorod	KHL	56	35	15	50	48	3	0	0	0	14
2009–10	Torpedo Nizhny Novgorod	KHL	51	27	10	37	67	—	—	—	—	—
2010–11	KalPa	SM-l	16	7	8	15	8	—	—	—	—	—
2010–11	Neftekhimik Nizhnekamsk	KHL	24	9	1	10	0	3	2	0	2	2
2011–12	HC ČSOB Pojišťovna Pardubice	ELH	6	5	3	8	4	—	—	—	—	—
2011–12	Rapperswil–Jona Lakers	NLA	17	2	3	5	8	—	—	—	—	—
2012–13	HC ČSOB Pojišťovna Pardubice	ELH	20	5	3	8	4	4	1	0	1	12
2013–14	HC Kometa Brno	ELH	6	0	4	4	0	—	—	—	—	—
2013–14	Lausitzer Füchse	DEU.2	14	3	12	15	6	5	0	1	1	2
2014–15	HK 36 Skalica	SVK	19	13	7	20	8	—	—	—	—	—
2015–16	HK 36 Skalica	SVK	46	19	10	29	68	—	—	—	—	—
2015–16	HKM Zvolen	SVK	6	3	3	6	4	12	5	2	7	14
2017–18	Wings HC Arlanda	SWE.3	12	5	3	8	14	—	—	—	—	—
2018–19	Kopla	FIN.4	1	0	4	4	2	7	7	8	15	2
AHL totals			160	51	56	107	74	7	4	1	5	0
NHL totals			78	11	11	22	16	2	0	0	0	0
KHL totals			131	71	26	97	115	6	2	0	2	16

=== International ===
Year	Team	Event	Result	GP	G	A	Pts	PIM
1998	Czech Republic	EJC18	4th	6	2	4	6	4
2001	Czech Republic	WJC	1st place, gold medalist(s)	7	4	6	10	8
Junior totals				13	6	10	16	12

== Awards and honors ==
Award	Year
International
World Junior Gold Medal	2001
World Junior Leading Scorer	2001
World Junior Best Plus/Minus	2001
World Junior Best Forward	2001
World Junior All-Star team	2001
Spengler Cup Scoring Leader	2006
Spengler Cup champion (HC Davos)	2011
WHL
Ed Chynoweth Cup champion (Calgary Hitmen)	1999
WHL Top Goal Scorer	1999, 2000
Bob Clarke Trophy (Most points)	1999
WHL Plus-Minus Award (Top plus-minus)	1999
Jim Piggott Memorial Trophy (WHL Rookie of the Year)	1999
CHL Rookie of the Year	1999
WHL East First Team All-Star	1999
CHL First All-Star Team	1999
CHL All-Rookie Team	1999
CHL Memorial Cup All-Star Team	1999
CHL Top Prospects Game	1999
CHL Top Draft Prospect Award	1999
WHL East Second Team All-Star	2000
CHL Third All-Star Team	2000
AHL
Calder Cup champion (Hartford Wolfpack)	2000
NHL
YoungStars Game	2003
Elitserien
Hakan Loob Trophy (Most goals)	2007
KHL
All-Star Game	2009
Best Sniper	2009

== Records ==
- Calgary Hitmen's franchise record for goals in a season (1998–99) (73)
- Calgary Hitmen's franchise record for points in a season (1998–99) (134)

Awards and achievements
Preceded by Manny Malhotra	New York Rangers first-round draft pick 1999	Succeeded by Jamie Lundmark
