= The Goldbergs season 2 =

The Goldbergs
- Season 2
- DVD cover
- Starring: Wendi McLendon-Covey; Sean Giambrone; Troy Gentile; Hayley Orrantia; George Segal; Jeff Garlin
- No. of episodes: 24

Release
- Original network: ABC
- Original release: September 24, 2014 – May 13, 2015

Season chronology
- ← Previous; Season 1 Next → Season 3

The second season of the American television comedy series The Goldbergs premiered on ABC on September 24, 2014. The season was produced by Adam F. Goldberg Productions, Happy Madison Productions, and Sony Pictures Television, and the executive producers are Adam F. Goldberg, Doug Robinson, and Seth Gordon.

The show explores the daily lives of the Goldberg family, a family living in Jenkintown, Pennsylvania in the 1980s. Beverly Goldberg (Wendi McLendon-Covey), the overprotective matriarch of the Goldbergs is married to Murray Goldberg (Jeff Garlin). They are the parents of three children, Erica (Hayley Orrantia), Barry (Troy Gentile), and Adam (Sean Giambrone).

ABC renewed The Goldbergs for its second season on May 8, 2014. For season two, The Goldbergs was moved to a new night and time; Wednesdays at 8:30 pm (ET). On October 23, 2014, ABC gave the season a full 24-episode order.

On May 7, 2015, the show was renewed for a third season.

== Plot ==
After Barry received a kiss from his crush, Erica's best friend Lainey, he spends the year trying to get her to like him, and after multiple rejections, the two ultimately become a couple. Murray reconciles with his father Ben, called "Pop-Pop" by the children to differentiate from "Pops". Adam's relationship with Dana continues but must overcome a huge hurdle when she reveals she and her family are moving to Seattle.

== Cast ==
=== Main cast ===
- Wendi McLendon-Covey as Beverly Goldberg
- Sean Giambrone as Adam Goldberg
- Troy Gentile as Barry Goldberg
- Hayley Orrantia as Erica Goldberg
- George Segal as Albert "Pops" Solomon
- Jeff Garlin as Murray Goldberg

=== Recurring cast ===
- Stephen Tobolowsky as Principal Ball
- Bryan Callen as Mr. Mellor
- Dan Bakkedahl as Mr. Woodburn
- Ana Gasteyer as Miss Cinoman
- Cedric Yarbrough as Vic
- Jennifer Irwin as Virginia Kremp
- AJ Michalka as Lainey Lewis
- Natalie Alyn Lind as Dana Caldwell
- Kenny Ridwan as Dave Kim
- Stephanie Katherine Grant as Emmy Mirsky
- Jacob Hopkins as Chad Kremp
- Matt Bush as Andy Cogan
- Sam Lerner as Geoff Schwartz
- Noah Munck as "Naked Rob" Smith

== Episodes ==
| No. overall | No. in season | Title | Directed by | Written by | Original release date | Prod. code | U.S. viewers (millions) |
|---|---|---|---|---|---|---|---|
| 24 | 1 | "Love Is a Mixtape" | Seth Gordon | Alex Barnow | September 24, 2014 | 201 | 7.31 |
When Adam makes a mixtape for Dana, Beverly sees it and assumes it's for her. Not wanting to disappoint his girlfriend or his mom, he gives Dana the same tape, but Dana hears it when Beverly picks her and Adam up from a movie date. This ultimately lands Adam into trouble with both Beverly and Dana. Meanwhile, Barry gets a fake I.D., but when it gets confiscated by Coach Mellor, he's forced to use Murray's I.D. to fulfill a promise he made to friends attending a party. Featured Song: "You're the Inspiration" by Chicago Guest Starring: David Spade as Gus, Mike Hagerty as Terence Notes: The date at the beginning of the episode is announced as "September 4th" instead of "September 24th".; The episode is dedicated to Adam's "first mix tape to Dana".
| 25 | 2 | "Mama Drama" | David Katzenberg | Teleplay by : Marc Firek; Story by : Marc Firek & Susan Cinoman | October 1, 2014 | 202 | 7.09 |
Adam auditions for the school musical but gets cast in a non-leading role while Dave Kim gets the lead, which angers Beverly, who casts him in a rival show and forces Erica to help. However, Adam's new status as a lead man leads to him becoming self-absorbed, which both complicates production and causes Dana to start ignoring Adam. In the end, Adam plays his part after Beverly helps him realize no part is too small. Meanwhile, Barry is angry at Murray's habit of leaving sporting events early in order to beat traffic and stops going with him, so Murray tries to replace him with Pops and Vic. Murray eventually wins back Barry, this time with the promise that they won't leave early, although they get stuck in traffic for two hours when the game is over. Featured Song: "Put a Little Love in Your Heart" by Annie Lennox and Al Green Guest Starring: Mason Cook as Tyler Stansfield Notes: The date at the beginning of the episode is announced as "December 8th" instead of "October 1st".; The episode is dedicated to "those of us stuck in the chorus ...and for good reason".; First appearance of Stephen Tobolowsky as Earl Ball, the school principal. He would go on to become a series regular on this show and its spin-off, Schooled.
| 26 | 3 | "The Facts of Bleeping Life" | Fred Savage | Chris Bishop & Adam F. Goldberg | October 8, 2014 | 203 | 7.32 |
After Barry and Adam make an agreement to not let a girl come between them, Barry betrays Adam and lets Erica and Lainey in their newly formed rock band, much to Adam's chagrin, leading him to quit. Barry attempts multiple times to win him back, but fails. He is later kicked out of his own band by being voted out by Lainey and Erica, angering Barry and dismaying him. This causes him to lose his spark for Lainey, even though she was never interested in him in the first place. He tries once again getting Adam back and he succeeds, this time with a plan to thwart Erica and Lainey from playing and successfully do so, creating a Battle of the Bands. Adam and Barry lose when Erica and Lainey kick them out. Meanwhile, Murray learns how much their marriage vow renewal means to Beverly and wakes up everyone who plays "Eternal Flame", thanks to the two bands who reconcile and merge. Beverly and Murray finally renew their vows. Also, Barry admits his love for Lainey, which she rejects, but he says he'll keep trying to win her over. Featured Songs: "We're Not Gonna Take It" by Twisted Sister, covered by Barry and Adam; "Eternal Flame" by The Bangles, covered by Erica and Lainey Notes: The date at the beginning of the episode is announced as "mid-summer" instead of "October 8th".; The episode is dedicated to "the garage bands of America".
| 27 | 4 | "Shall We Play a Game?" | David Katzenberg | Niki Schwartz-Wright & Mac Marshall | October 22, 2014 | 204 | 7.05 |
Barry is accidentally kicked out of his cool friend group "JTP" (Jenkintown Posse) and Adam must come up with a plan to get him back in. Adam convinces Barry and his friends he has the skills to hack into the school computer system to change their grades, but does he? Meanwhile, Beverly is immediately jealous when she learns Erica hangs out with a friend's cooler mom and sets out to show Erica she can be cool too. Featured Songs: "Never Surrender" by Stan Bush, "Rhythm of the Night" by DeBarge Guest Starring: Gillian Vigman as Louise Rubin Notes: The episode is dedicated to "the real JTP".; First appearances of Matt Bush as Andy Cogan, Sam Lerner as Geoff Schwartz and Noah Munck as "Naked Rob" Smith. All would go on to become series regulars, with Lerner being featured in the main cast starting with season 5.; First of three season co-star appearances of Jackson Odell as Ari Caldwell.
| 28 | 5 | "Family Takes Care of Beverly" | Claire Scanlon | Lew Schneider | October 29, 2014 | 207 | 6.91 |
Pops moves into the Goldberg home after he's evicted from his apartment for starting a fire, and Beverly doesn't want him to leave (even though he says he wants to), forcing Murray to drive Pops to Shady Willows Retirement Home. Beverly expresses concern about being left alone, and tries to claim a spot in Adam's future life, causing him to temporarily move in with Pops. Meanwhile, Barry "saves" Erica from a "dangerous" candy mixture of pop rocks and soda and wants a date with Lainey from her in return. Erica lies to Barry by saying Lainey doesn't want anything to do with him, but after he eats the same thing Erica does to have an "honorable samurai death", she thinks he's faking it. After Barry is rushed to the emergency room (not because of pop rocks, but a bowel obstruction) he finally gets a date with Lainey. Although he can't eat for 24 hours, Barry shares a slice of pizza with Lainey in his hospital bed. Unfortunately, Beverly finds out Barry is in the hospital and rushes in, much to his disgust. Featured Song: "I Melt with You" by Modern English Notes: The date at the beginning of the episode is announced as "October 31st" instead of "October 29th".; The episode is dedicated to Adam's "mother... who's still trying to move in with [him]".
| 29 | 6 | "Big Baby Ball" | David Katzenberg | Marc Firek | November 12, 2014 | 206 | 7.54 |
When Coach Mellor singles out Adam during a game of Dodgeball, Beverly intervenes to protect Adam and gets Mellor fired, and after Murray starts to see Mellor in a new light, he offers him a job working at Ottoman Empire. However, Mellor's knack for being a gym teacher causes him to clash with Murray. Mellor eventually shows up to the Goldberg home to apologize to Murray after a botched delivery job, and also apologizes to Adam, stating that he's only hard on him because he wants the best for him. Beverly eventually convinces Principal Ball to rehire Mellor on the condition that she stays out of William Penn Academy for a year. Meanwhile, Barry can't accept that Erica is better than him at their new board game, "Trivial Pursuit". After being caught cheating at the game, Barry creates his own game that only he can win at, but Erica beats him at that too, causing Barry to quit board games. Erica eventually proposes a winner-takes-all game, stating that Trivial Pursuit will be banned forever if Barry wins. By secretly subbing out the game cards with the cards from the junior edition, Erica lets Barry win. Featured Song: "The Warrior" by Scandal Note: The episode is dedicated to "the glory that is gym class".
| 30 | 7 | "A Goldberg Thanksgiving" | Jay Chandrasekhar | Chris Bishop | November 19, 2014 | 209 | 7.70 |
It's Thanksgiving and Beverly and Erica make a bet: if she can outdo Beverly at Jazzercise exercises, she doesn't have to participate in Thanksgiving dinner. Erica wins, leading her to opt out of the holiday and spend it with Lainey, resulting in Beverly scrambling to win her back, even going as far to fake an injury so Erica will stay. Meanwhile, Uncle Marvin visits and Murray gets annoyed when Marvin and Adam start to form a close bond. Murray is jealous of Marvin and Adam and tries to come between them, but it quickly gets out of hand. When Erica says she is going to Lainey's for the whole weekend, Pops tells her to celebrate Thanksgiving with Beverly because her and Nana did it every year when Beverly was her age, but Nana died when Beverly was just 17. Wanting to get closer to Adam, Murray begins a tradition of playing video games every Thanksgiving with him while Erica and Beverly cook together. Featured Song: "St. Elmo's Fire (Man in Motion)" by John Parr Guest Starring: Dan Fogler as Marvin Goldberg Notes: The date at the beginning of the episode is announced as "November 22nd" instead of "November 19th".; The episode is dedicated to "the Goldberg family Thanksgiving".
| 31 | 8 | "I Rode a Hoverboard" | Victor Nelli Jr. | Robia Rashad | December 3, 2014 | 205 | 6.59 |
Adam breaks his arm and exaggerates at school that he fell off of a hover board just like in the Back to the Future movie, and the lie threatens his friendship with Emmy Mirsky after she defends his story. Meanwhile, the family falls in love with a new Chinese restaurant in town owned by Dave Kim's parents and Beverly fears she's being replaced in the kitchen. When Beverly gets the boys and Erica banned from the restaurant, it begins a war between Beverly and Dave Kim's mom over who is the better cook. Featured Song: "Faith" by George Michael Guest Starring: Suzy Nakamura as Mrs. Kim Notes: The episode is dedicated to "the Adam/Emmy friendship swear".; First appearance of Dan Bakkedahl as Dale Woodburn, the school's shop teacher. He would go on to become a series regular.
| 32 | 9 | "The Most Handsome Boy on the Planet" | David Katzenberg | Matt Tarses | December 10, 2014 | 208 | 7.41 |
Barry goes to the mall and falls for a modeling scam. Meanwhile, while at the movies with Emmy Mirsky, Adam and Murray run into Murray's father Ben (Paul Sorvino), resulting in Adam trying to reunite Murray and "Pop-Pop". Although his attempts appear to fail, Pop-Pop shows up during the family's New Year countdown party and is invited to celebrate with them. Featured Song: "Kokomo" by The Beach Boys Guest Starring: Rob Huebel as John Calabasas Notes: The date at the beginning of the episode is announced as "December 28th" instead of "December 10th".; The episode dedication is replaced by the message "Happy New Year from the Goldbergs".; This is the first and only appearance of Paul Sorvino as Ben "Pop-Pop" Goldberg. Starting with season 3, he is played by Judd Hirsch.; First appearance of Rob Huebel as John Calabasas, a local con artist. He would go on to become a series regular, appearing at least once in every season from 2 through 10.
| 33 | 10 | "DannyDonnieJoeyJonJordan" | David Katzenberg | Steve Basilone & Annie Mebane | January 7, 2015 | 210 | 7.79 |
After falling boxes trap Murray in the garage, he demands Beverly get rid of all the kids old artwork and school projects except for one trunk. When the trunk goes missing, however, Murray becomes sentimental about what was inside. Erica has trouble parting with her New Kids on the Block memorabilia. Learning of their sister's former obsession, Adam and Barry finally have an opportunity to tease Erica mercilessly, but it results in a surprising turn for the brothers and they get hooked on NKOTB songs. Featured Songs: "Hangin' Tough" and "You Got It (The Right Stuff)" by New Kids on the Block Note: The episode is dedicated to "the New Kids on the Block... [Adam's] childhood guilty pleasure", followed by a comparison of Adam's "Hangin' Tough" home video played side-by-side with the show's re-enactment.
| 34 | 11 | "The Darryl Dawkins Dance" | Jay Chandrasekhar | Steve Basilone & Annie Mebane | January 14, 2015 | 211 | 7.22 |
As the Sadie Hawkins dance approaches, Erica asks Beverly to help her find Barry a date to keep him away from Lainey. Beverly locates a girl named Evelyn Silver (Allie Grant), hoping to set her up with Barry. However, he and Erica are both creeped out when Evelyn shows many uncanny similarities to Beverly. But at the dance, Lainey and Barry both ditch their dates to dance with each other. Meanwhile, Adam is traumatized by the death of Optimus Prime in The Transformers: The Movie, and gets into a fight with Pops while trying to shoot his own version of the film where Optimus (played by Pops) lives. Featured Song: "Heaven" by Warrant Notes: The date at the beginning of the episode is announced as "Saturday morning" instead of "January 14th".; The episode is dedicated to Adam's "first love: The Transformers, and the movie [he] made to bring back Optimus Prime".; Jeff Garlin's son James makes an appearance in the episode as "Mini Murray". He would appear in another episode in season 6.
| 35 | 12 | "Cowboy Country" | David Katzenberg | Stacey Harman | February 11, 2015 | 212 | 6.87 |
Lainey calls Barry her boyfriend for the first time, and she wants their fathers to meet. The two seem to hit it off until Murray, a lifelong Philadelphia Eagles fan, discovers that Lainey's dad Bill (David Koechner) is a huge Dallas Cowboys fan. Meanwhile, Adam is frustrated with being a "late bloomer" and feels like Dana will leave him for an older-looking classmate. He tries to impress Dana by giving her one of Beverly's expensive rings, but Beverly catches Adam and grounds him. Encouraged by Erica, Adam sneaks out to a party Dana is attending and climbs a water tower to spray paint their names on it in view of their classmates, but things go awry when Adam can't get down and has to be rescued by the fire department. An embarrassed Adam is caught by Beverly, but instead of further punishing him, she drives him to Dana's house where they make up. Featured Song: "Romeo and Juliet" by Dire Straits Guest Starring: Zayne Emory as J.C. Spink, Charlie DePew as Anthony Balsamo Notes: The date at the beginning of the episode is announced as "January 7th" instead of "February 11th".; The episode is dedicated to "all the late bloomers like [Adam]".; First appearance of David Koechner as Murray's friend and Lainey's dad Bill Lewis. He would go on to become a series regular.; First appearance of Zayne Emory as J.C. Spink, who was previously played by Cooper Roth.; First of four season co-star appearances of Nate Hartley as classmate Dan Morse.
| 36 | 13 | "Van People" | Victor Nelli Jr. | Alex Barnow | February 18, 2015 | 213 | 6.84 |
When Murray gets mad at Erica for not filling up the gas tank, she and Barry get revenge by purchasing a used van. Barry and Erica argue with Murray until their dad lets them move into the van, against Beverly's wishes. Adam is disappointed when he sees an early draft of the yearbook and learns he has been voted "nicest guy", so he tries to get voted Class Clown instead. When Adam does a hurtful prank on his teacher, Dana gets mad at him and tells him that she nominated him "nicest guy" and wants him to be himself. In the end, Murray and Erica agree they are both stubborn people and make up. Featured Song: "The Way It Is" by Bruce Hornsby and the Range Guest Starring: Zayne Emory as J.C. Spink Notes: The date at the beginning of the episode is announced as "May 10th" instead of "February 18th".; The episode is dedicated to "David Sirota and class clowns everywhere... ...and the surprising people they become".; First of four season co-star appearances of Sam Kindseth as classmate David Sirota.
| 37 | 14 | "Barry Goldberg's Day Off" | David Katzenberg | Adam F. Goldberg | February 25, 2015 | 214 | 7.64 |
Based on the movie Ferris Bueller's Day Off, Barry fakes an illness to ditch school with Adam and Pops, but Barry does not do a good job as Ferris. He tries to get Lainey out of class by saying her grandmother's dead, which annoys her, he gets confronted by security at an art museum, the trio gets pelted with food at a baseball game, Pops' car gets stolen, and Beverly (leaving her first day of work at a florist) tracks them down and grounds Barry. Erica also has to wait in a police station with a convict (Charlie Sheen), who tells her not to worry about Barry and Adam. Sheen, who played a juvenile delinquent in the original Ferris movie, then says he feels like he's "been here for 30 [bleeped] years." Erica convinces Barry to sneak out to the homecoming, where Lainey is on a float with her ex. Barry misinterprets what Erica says, though, and sings "Twist and Shout" like in the movie. The crowd, who all know the movie, get what Barry is doing and sing along. Lainey and Erica join Barry on the float, singing without microphones. Adam manages to capture Barry's song on his camcorder, saying he no longer wants to be Ferris, but instead wants to be John Hughes, the director of the movie. Featured Songs: "Oh Yeah" by Yello; "Twist and Shout" by The Beatles, covered by Barry and Lainey Guest Starring: Troy Winbush as Officer Puchinski, Charlie DePew as Anthony Balsamo, Jeff Witzke as Maître d' Notes: The date at the beginning of the episode is announced as "April 27th" instead of "February 25th".; The episode is dedicated to "John Hughes, the voice of our generation".; Charlie Sheen makes a cameo in the episode reprising his Garth Volbeck role from Ferris Bueller's Day Off.; This is the final appearance of Jackson Odell as Ari Caldwell.
| 38 | 15 | "Happy Mom, Happy Life" | Claire Scanlon | Andrew Secunda | March 4, 2015 | 219 | 7.86 |
Adam chooses Dana as his partner for a health project where they must raise a Cabbage Patch Kid, and Beverly becomes the "grand-smother" without permission. Adam is pressured to back up Beverly over Dana, much to her disliking, so Adam asks for advice from Murray and Pops, who tell him he should tell Dana that she should call the shots in the relationship, but messes up when he lets Dana talk to Beverly, against Murray and Pops' wishes. Meanwhile, Barry's friends, the JTP, are upset that Barry chooses to hang out with Lainey instead of them, and Erica is upset about the same problem with Lainey. As a result, Erica joins the JTP to break up Barry and Lainey, which Barry does not like. Soon after, all three members of the JTP fall in love with Erica and she gets confused. At the same time, Adam and Dana take a break from the project and have Murray watch the baby. Beverly finds out and starts to do the project for them and does well, until a dog steals it. Beverly goes to a black-market toy dealer and is forced to buy what she thinks is the doll out of his car trunk, but turns out to be a knockoff. Adam and Dana find out, and Adam is torn when Dana storms out when she finds out the truth. The JTP starts to stand outside of Erica's room and play the song "Alone" by Heart from boomboxes, parodying the film Say Anything... to win her over. Barry and Lainey come in, saying Erica's plan was hurtful. Erica tearfully admits that she just wanted her friend back, because she feels abandoned ever since they started going out. Lainey gets Erica tickets to a Heart concert, and Erica apologizes. Barry also gets his spot back in the JTP after he says that Erica can't stay in his posse because she is torn between who she loves. Meanwhile, Adam stands up to Beverly, saying she needs to butt out, and his teachers commends him for his work soon after. Beverly invites Dana over, where she and Adam hang out in the tree house. Beverly tries to tough it out, and Murray helps her by saying that Adam is having a good time. Featured Song: "Alone" by Heart Guest Starring: Nick Swardson as Rick Lancer, Michaela Watkins as Miss Taraborelli Notes: The date at the beginning of the episode is announced as "March 10th" instead of "March 4th".; The episode is dedicated to "the phony Cabbage Patch Kid [his] mom bought [him]".
| 39 | 16 | "The Lost Boy" | David Katzenberg | Josh Goldsmith & Cathy Yuspa | March 25, 2015 | 220 | 6.76 |
Murray brings Adam to a Phillies baseball game at Veterans Stadium. Murray convinces his son that he is old enough to go to the bathroom on his own, but fear of the urinal trough and nasty stalls in one bathroom leads to Adam searching for cleaner facilities and getting lost. Elsewhere, Beverly guilt-trips Erica and Barry into bedazzling things with her and letting her tag along with them on a trip to the movies. Frustrated, the kids consult Pops, who reveals that his secret to avoiding Beverly's guilt trips is, "Don't feel, it's not real." The kids take this to heart and shun their mother's smothering guilt, but later realize that Beverly is feeling real regret that her children won't be around much longer. Featured Song: "Have a Little Faith in Me" by John Hiatt Guest Starring: Diedrich Bader as Lou, Larry Joe Campbell as Paul, Troy Winbush as Officer Puchinski Notes: The date at the beginning of the episode is announced as "May 11th" instead of "March 25th".; The episode is dedicated "in loving memory of Veterans Stadium 1971-2004".; Only season co-star appearance of Ben Zelevansky as Dale.
| 40 | 17 | "The Adam Bomb" | Lew Schneider | Chris Bishop | April 1, 2015 | 217 | 7.21 |
When Lainey says it's a turn-off that Barry teases Adam mercilessly, Barry vows to stop. But after an April fools joke by Adam causes Barry to destroys one of Adam's favorite toys, it escalates into an all-out war between the two, with Barry going as far as to destroying Adam's video camera. This results in Adam lying to Lainey about Barry wanting to break up with her, causing Lainey to break up with Barry. Barry plans to retaliate by posting an embarrassing photo of Adam to the whole school, but later doesn't due to a video he saw in school and realizes the wrong of his actions. In the end, Barry puts together Adam's video camera back and Adam returns the favor by getting Barry and Lainey back together. Meanwhile, Erica finds out that singer Tiffany will be appearing at the local mall and she asks Murray for $200 to make a demo tape that she can give to her. Murray refuses, saying a singing career is a million-to-one shot. Beverly initially agrees with her husband, until she learns that many teen singing sensations are managed by their mothers. Featured Song: "I Think We're Alone Now" by Tiffany Note: The episode is dedicated to "the most embarrassing photo ever taken".
| 41 | 18 | "I Drank the Mold!" | Jon Corn | Aaron Kaczander | April 8, 2015 | 221 | 6.54 |
Against Adam's wishes, Beverly organizes a sleepover party with some of his friends, including the principal's son who brings a beer from his father's home brew stash. After everyone but Adam takes a swig, they all get sick and throw up. Beverly catches Adam with the beer bottle before he can drink any. Furious, Beverly attends a meeting with all the kids' parents and the principal, who says the beer was from his unfermented batch, so the kids basically just drank mold. Beverly says the kids are growing up too fast, and orders that they stop seeing each other as friends. This makes Adam rebel against Beverly, and he draws the beer from the garbage to take a sip and show mom he's united with his friends, but he regrets this action moments later. Elsewhere, Barry and Erica try to convince Murray to spring for a $900 stereo with the latest technology – a CD player, saying that it's essential to developing their musical talent. Murray plays along and says if the kids can write a hit song, he'll buy the stereo. The kids try their hand at songwriting, but their song "Love Ninja" is deemed awful by Pops. They then try to pass off an Elton John song as their own, but Murray sees through it. The kids then sell a bunch of their stuff and buy the stereo as a "gift" to their father, but he knows it's really a gift for themselves. Murray declares that only he can listen to music on the new CD player, frustrating the kids, but he later recants after seeing Erica in her room singing and playing her guitar. Featured Song: "Your Song" by Elton John, covered by Hayley Orrantia Guest Starring: Nathan Gamble as Garry Ball, Suzy Nakamura as Mrs. Kim Notes: The date at the beginning of the episode is announced as "April 2nd" instead of "April 8th".; The episode is dedicated to Adam's "one cool friend, Garry Ball".
| 42 | 19 | "La Biblioteca Es Libros" | David Katzenberg | Marc Firek | April 15, 2015 | 216 | 6.87 |
When Adam fails a Spanish test, Beverly is certain it's the teacher's fault because Adam does well in all his other subjects. She then pays Miss Taraborelli (Michaela Watkins) to tutor Adam after hours, but the other students in the class become angry at what they view as Adam's special treatment. Elsewhere, Barry gets his first job delivering pizzas, causing Murray to go overboard and share a beer with Barry to commemorate him "becoming a man." This angers Erica, because she has had a job for two years and Murray has never given her any such attention. Barry gets fired for eating the pizza after two days, but continues to act like he's going to work because his dad was so proud of him. Featured Songs: "La Bamba" by Ritchie Valens, "Back in the High Life Again" by Steve Winwood Guest Starring: Parvesh Cheena as Andy Cesunda Note: The episode is dedicated to "Señora Taraborelli's Spanish class".
| 43 | 20 | "Just Say No!" | Victor Nelli Jr. | Niki Schwartz-Wright | April 15, 2015 | 215 | 5.68 |
Erica is at odds with Murray when she supports the Walter Mondale/Geraldine Ferraro ticket for president, while Murray staunchly supports Ronald Reagan. When she sees that Beverly is ambiguous about politics, Erica tries to educate her mother on the issues. But this leads to Beverly latching onto one issue in particular – Nancy Reagan's "Just Say No to Drugs" campaign. Meanwhile, Barry is determined to become a contestant on the American Gladiators competition show, and he has Adam make a video of his athletic prowess. After filming several of Barry's comical attempts at feats of strength, Adam secretly sends the tape to America's Funniest Home Videos instead. Featured Song: "Tarzan Boy" by Baltimora Notes: The date at the beginning of the episode is announced as "November 2nd" instead of "April 15th".; The episode is dedicated to Adam's "childhood anti-drug PSA".
| 44 | 21 | "As You Wish" | David Katzenberg | Alex Barnow | April 22, 2015 | 218 | 7.16 |
Beverly is being more of a Yenta than usual, but when she takes it a step farther and tries to set up two teachers she has been gossiping about, Barry and Erica beg her to stop. Elsewhere, Adam, inspired by the swashbuckling scenes in The Princess Bride, asks Murray for a real sword. When Murray refuses, Adam plays on dad's soft spot for getting his children involved in sports, and says he wants to take up fencing. Featured Song: "Somebody to Love" by Queen, covered by Hayley Orrantia Guest Starring: Suzy Nakamura as Mrs. Kim Note: The episode is dedicated to "yentas everywhere".
| 45 | 22 | "Dance Party USA" | David Katzenberg | Teleplay by : Andrew Secunda; Story by : Evan Turner | April 29, 2015 | 222 | 6.77 |
Adam gambles at school after he thinks he has inherited Pops' luck and, as a result, loses all his favorite toys to his friend, Principal Ball's son Garry. Beverly goes to Mr. Ball to get the toys back and plays cards against him but loses, and Pops does too. Beverly decides to go to the toy store to replace them, pretending Pops won them back, but Adam sees through it and learns that Pops has lied to him about a lot of things, but Adam forgives him. Meanwhile, Erica and Lainey are set to go on Dance Party USA, but Barry wants to join and is rejected. However, Barry gives Erica pink eye, which causes Lainey to go behind her back and decide to dance with Barry only. With pink eye, Erica has to wear her nerdy glasses because she cannot wear contact lenses. However, Barry and Lainey relent, and they take Erica to the Dance Party USA taping. Lainey then catches pink eye in both eyes because of Erica and Barry, and has to wear Erica's nerdy glasses. Featured Song: "Faithfully" by Journey Guest Starring: Nathan Gamble as Garry Ball Note: The episode is dedicated "in loving memory of Dance Party USA".
| 46 | 23 | "Bill/Murray" | David Katzenberg | Chris Bishop & Josh Goldsmith | May 6, 2015 | 223 | 6.81 |
Murray is called in to Principal Ball's office along with Lainey's father Bill, because Barry and Lainey have been seen constantly kissing all over school. Enemies after the Cowboys-Eagles incident, the two unexpectedly form a bond and become friends after discovering they have a lot in common. However, Murray ends the friendship due to Bill getting emotional and crying about his divorce. Bill gets upset that Murray is avoiding him, and this also upsets Barry and Lainey when they see their dads' renewed rivalry as a threat to their relationship. In the end, after Pops helps Murray realize what it means to be a real friend, he and Bill reconcile, much to their children's delight. Meanwhile, after seeing her kids watching MTV, Beverly recruits Adam to help Erica make a video application to Juilliard. Despite obvious evidence that Juilliard is a long shot, Beverly thinks it's a great college choice for Erica because it would be close to home. But major obstacles get in the way of the video when Adam tries to make big production out of it, causing Erica to just be herself in the end. Featured Songs: "True Colors" by Cyndi Lauper, covered by Hayley Orrantia; "Everybody Have Fun Tonight" by Wang Chung Guest Starring: David Koechner as Bill Lewis, Tim Meadows as Mr. Glascott Notes: The episode is dedicated to Adam's "dad's best/only friend, Bill Lewis".; Mr. Glascott refers to himself as "Andre" in this episode even though his name is actually Jonathan. A later episode reveals he thought his "Jonathan" name was too boring, and an episode of the spin-off Schooled reveals his master's diploma was mistakenly printed with the name "Andre".; This is the final appearance of Ginny Gardner as Lexy Bloom.
| 47 | 24 | "Goldbergs Feel Hard" | David Katzenberg | Adam F. Goldberg | May 13, 2015 | 224 | 6.70 |
Beverly and Murray have a hard time saying farewell to Erica as she prepares to leave for a summer arts program. Beverly insists that Erica tell her father that she loves him, but Erica realizes she can milk her mom for a few bribes first. Meanwhile, Barry tells Lainey that he loves her, but when she does not say it back, he becomes the school mascot to get closer to her, unaware that a rival team plans to beat up the mascot. Inspired, Adam goes to tell Dana that he loves her, but she drops a bombshell: her dad has a job offer in Seattle and her family may have to move. Featured Song: "If You Leave" by Orchestral Manoeuvres in the Dark Guest Starring: J.C. Spink as Joe the Bus Driver Notes: The episode is dedicated to Adam's "family", followed by a montage of Adam's home video clips played side-by-side with the show's re-enactments of them.; The second and final appearance of the real J.C. Spink on the show before his death in 2017.
