= The Goldbergs season 1 =

The Goldbergs
- Season 1
- DVD cover
- Starring: Wendi McLendon-Covey; Sean Giambrone; Troy Gentile; Hayley Orrantia; George Segal; Jeff Garlin
- No. of episodes: 23

Release
- Original network: ABC
- Original release: September 24, 2013 – May 13, 2014

Season chronology
- Next → Season 2

The first season of the television comedy series The Goldbergs aired on ABC from September 24, 2013 to May 13, 2014. Series creator Adam F. Goldberg served as executive producer alongside Doug Robinson, and Seth Gordon. It was produced by Adam F. Goldberg Productions, Happy Madison Productions, and Sony Pictures Television.

The show explores the daily lives of the Goldberg family, a family living in Jenkintown, Pennsylvania in the 1980s. Beverly Goldberg (Wendi McLendon-Covey), the overprotective matriarch of the Goldbergs is married to Murray Goldberg (Jeff Garlin). They are the parents of three children, Erica (Hayley Orrantia), Barry (Troy Gentile), and Adam (Sean Giambrone).

After airing only six episodes, ABC gave the show a full season pickup of 23 episodes. It was renewed for a second season on May 8, 2014.

The first episode premiered to 8.94 million viewers, second only to NCIS: Los Angeles. It garnered a 3.1/8 adults 18-49 rating, beating the aforementioned NCIS: Los Angeles, as well as New Girl and Capture.

== Cast ==
=== Main cast ===
- Wendi McLendon-Covey as Beverly Goldberg
- Sean Giambrone as Adam Goldberg
- Troy Gentile as Barry Goldberg
- Hayley Orrantia as Erica Goldberg
- George Segal as Albert "Pops" Solomon
- Jeff Garlin as Murray Goldberg

=== Recurring cast ===
- Natalie Alyn Lind as Dana Caldwell
- AJ Michalka as Lainey Lewis
- Ginny Gardner as Lexy Bloom
- Stephanie Katherine Grant as Emmy Mirsky
- Jacob Hopkins as Chad Kremp

== Episodes ==
No. overall	No. in season	Title	Directed by	Written by	Original release date	Prod. code	U.S. viewers (millions)
1	1	"The Circle of Driving"	Seth Gordon	Adam F. Goldberg	September 24, 2013	100	8.94
As 11-year-old Adam Goldberg captures his family's daily life in the 1980s on videotape with his new camcorder, his older brother Barry is looking forward to getting a car after getting his learner's permit. But on Barry's 16th birthday, he gets a present he does not expect. Also, Adam's older sister Erica, who's another teenage driver in the household, fights with Barry over the family station wagon. Meanwhile, their young-at-heart, ladies' man grandfather, Pops is getting too old to get behind the wheel. Featured Song: "Can't Fight This Feeling" by REO Speedwagon Guest Starring: Troy Winbush as Officer Puchinski Notes: The date at the beginning of the episode is announced as "September 3rd" and does not include the "1980-something" that would become a familiar part of each show over the ten-season run.; The episode is dedicated to Adam's "real family ... Murray, Pops, Beverly, Barry, Adam".; First appearance of Troy Winbush as Officer Puchinski. He would go on to become a series regular, appearing at least once in every season except season 4.
2	2	"Daddy Daughter Day"	Seth Gordon	Adam F. Goldberg	October 1, 2013	101	6.06
The family tradition of roller skating is in jeopardy after Erica's moodiness comes into play after hanging out with her father, Murray, and telling him about her daily drama. Meanwhile, "smother" mother Beverly takes Adam school clothes shopping after he wants his own age-appropriate clothes, but, not wanting him to grow up too fast, she still makes him wear little kids clothes. After Pops goes behind Beverly's back and buys Adam cooler clothes, she retaliates by purposely shrinking them when she does laundry, but later sees how excited Adam was about the clothes and takes him to buy new ones. Featured Song: "Come Sail Away" by Styx Notes: The date at the beginning of the episode is announced as "September 8th" and includes "1980-something" for the first time.; The episode is dedicated to "the real Murray".
3	3	"Mini Murray"	Troy Miller	Alex Barnow & Marc Firek	October 8, 2013	102	5.76
When Barry wants money to purchase a pair of expensive Reebok Pump basketball sneakers, he gets an important lesson from Murray. Meanwhile, Adam asks Beverly to take him to see the PG-rated horror movie Poltergeist, which Beverly disapproves of because she thinks its way too scary for Adam and instead makes Pops take him to see a movie about "A mouse detective." Adam tricks Pops into taking him to Poltergeist, and Beverly is proven right when Adam is too afraid to sleep at night, and later uses this to her advantage. Featured Song: "Here I Go Again" by Whitesnake Guest Starring: Cedric Yarbrough as Vic Notes: The date at the beginning of the episode is announced as "October 5th".; First appearance of Cedric Yarbrough as Murray's co-worker and friend Vic. He would go on to become a series regular.; First of two season co-star appearances of Ben Zelevansky as Dale. He would go on to become a series regular.
4	4	"Why're You Hitting Yourself?"	Jason Ensler	Sally Bradford	October 15, 2013	104	5.05
Adam and Barry share a brotherly bond after they accidentally discover a secret scrambled porn channel on television. Meanwhile, Beverly becomes involved in Pops' dating life when he's almost hitting on younger ladies at his favorite bar. She involves a disgruntled Murray and tries to play matchmaker for her father, finding a suitable mature woman around his age. Featured Song: "Let My Love Open the Door" by Pete Townshend Guest Starring: Alex Meneses as Sophia Notes: The date at the beginning of the episode is announced as "October 12th".; The episode is dedicated to "the real Barry".
5	5	"The Ring"	Seth Gordon	Matt Tarses	October 22, 2013	103	5.20
While cleaning out the garage, Erica and Barry discover a box full of love letters written by Murray to a woman named Anita, his first love. Beverly finds out and learns that her engagement ring is the same one Murray gave to his ex-fiancée. Meanwhile, Adam falls for the girl next door, Dana Caldwell (Natalie Alyn Lind), and turns to Pops for advice. He also finds inspiration in the romantic comedy Say Anything... and holds up a boombox outside her window to woo her, just like the character in the movie did. Featured Song: "In Your Eyes" by Peter Gabriel Guest Starring: Brian Huskey as Andy Secunda Notes: The date at the beginning of the episode is announced as "October 4th".; The episode dedication is replaced by a message that "Murray really gave Beverly a used ring and she still wears it to this day".; First appearance of Natalie Alyn Lind as Adam's neighbor and love interest Dana Caldwell. She would go on to become a series regular.; First of four season co-star appearances of Jackson Odell as Dana's older brother Ari Caldwell.
6	6	"Who Are You Going to Telephone?"	Victor Nelli	Chris Bishop	October 29, 2013	105	5.43
Beverly loves Halloween, but becomes despondent after the kids won't celebrate the holiday with her because they want to do their own thing. Meanwhile, Adam goes trick or treating with an older teenager named Evan Turner (Tanner Buchanan) and a bunch of Evan's friends. That night, they play pranks on younger kids and vandalized every house on Adam's street, including Adam's house. It soon turns chaotic when Murray finds out that Adam vandalized his own home and as punishment, he grounds him for three weeks, taking away "egg privileges", including omelettes, and makes him clean the roof. Featured Song: "Ghostbusters" by Ray Parker, Jr. Notes: The date at the beginning of the episode is announced as "Halloween".; The episode dedication is replaced by the message "Dear Barry, I'm sorry".
7	7	"Call Me When You Get There"	Michael Patrick Jann	Michael J. Weithorn	November 5, 2013	106	4.89
When Barry receives his driver's license, Beverly enforces a set of new rules of the road with the car, including the most important, "Call me when you get there!" Meanwhile, when Beverly buys Pops a Life Alert necklace, he rejects the gift. However, after one slip, he's fallen and he can't get up, and he's forced to call for Adam to go get help. Featured Song: "It's Tricky" by Run-DMC Notes: The date at the beginning of the episode is announced as "October 18th".; The episode dedication is replaced by the message "Dear Murray, Sorry for always ruining your TV time".
8	8	"The Kremps"	Victor Nelli	Darlene Hunt	November 12, 2013	107	5.12
The Goldbergs meet The Kremps, an all-American family, well put together and perfect. When they invite the Kremps over for a barbecue, the afternoon turns into a chaotic, frenzy afternoon no one saw coming. Elsewhere, Adam befriends Chad Kremp (Jacob Hopkins), who shares several of Adam's interests, but when Beverly and Chad's mom Virginia (Jennifer Irwin) feud, it threatens the new friendship between the two boys. Meanwhile, Barry and Erica have their own feud when they battle for control over the one telephone line in the whole house. Featured Song: "Nothing's Gonna Stop Us Now" by Starship Guest Starring: Tom Cavanagh as Charles Kremp Notes: This is the first episode without a date announcement at the beginning of the episode.; The episode is dedicated to Adam's "best friend, Chad Kremp".; The real Chad Kremp appears in the episode as a deli employee. He would eventually take over the role of Chad's father, Charles Kremp, replacing Tom Cavanagh.; First appearance of Jennifer Irwin as Beverly's friend and neighbor Virginia "Ginzy" Kremp. She would go on to become a series regular.
9	9	"Stop Arguing and Start Thanking"	Matt Sohn	Lew Schneider	November 19, 2013	110	5.03
When Murray's younger brother Marvin (Dan Fogler) comes over for Thanksgiving, he has a tendency on bringing stress to the holiday and the brother ignite their longstanding feud with each other. Meanwhile, Adam and Barry compete in a traditional sport they made up called "Ball Ball", which is similar to football. But when Barry cheats and loses for the very first time, it causes their own brotherly fight. Featured Song: "Sister Christian" by Night Ranger Notes: The date at the beginning of the episode is announced as "Thanksgiving Day".; The episode is dedicated "in loving memory of the Goldberg Thanksgiving".; First appearance of Dan Fogler as Murray's younger brother Marvin Goldberg. He would go on to become a series regular.
10	10	"Shopping"	David Katzenberg	Niki Schwartz-Wright	December 3, 2013	108	4.56
Erica's new job at Gimbels is jeopardized when Beverly goes overboard with her daughter's employee discount. So much so, when Erica accidentally sends Beverly to the mall jail for stealing the perfume, she is escorted by a security guard and is arrested by the police that who caught her for shoplifting in the clothing department. Meanwhile, Pops looks to change Barry's constant sting of bad luck in his life. Featured Song: "American Girl" by Tom Petty and the Heartbreakers Guest Starring: Rizwan Manji as Donald Notes: The date at the beginning of the episode is announced as "November 19th".; The episode is dedicated to "the real Beverly".
11	11	"Kara-te"	Seth Gordon	Andrew Secunda	December 10, 2013	109	4.77
On the eve of the annual high school talent show, Beverly and Murray square off against the kids' disenchanted guidance counselor Mr. Glascott (Tim Meadows) over Barry's plan to perform his karate routine. Meanwhile, Pops encourages a reluctant Erica to sing in the show, giving her confidence to perform. Featured Song: "Hit Me with Your Best Shot" by Pat Benatar, covered by Hayley Orrantia Notes: The date at the beginning of the episode is announced as "December 9th".; The episode is dedicated to Adam's "brother who taught [him] Kara-te".; First appearance of Tim Meadows as John Glascott, a school guidance counselor that later becomes a friend and neighbor of the Goldbergs. He would go on to become a series regular on this show and its spin-off, Schooled.
12	12	"You're Under Foot"	Seth Gordon	Michael J. Weithorn	January 7, 2014	112	5.28
When Beverly complains that Pops is spending too much time with her at home, Murray takes him back to work at the furniture store, but in doing so Pops starts running the store how he wants and criticizes Murray's work ethic. Meanwhile, after studying with Dana up in his room filled with kids toys, Adam follows Erica and Barry's questionable advice and reluctantly gives away his beloved toys away, hoping it will help him get his first kiss with Dana. Featured Song: "My Life" by Billy Joel Guest Starring: Cedric Yarbrough as Vic Notes: The date at the beginning of the episode is announced as "January 11th".; The episode is dedicated to "Megatron".
13	13	"The Other Smother"	Michael Patrick Jann	Stacey Harmon	January 14, 2014	111	4.89
Micromanaging Barry and Erica's college searches pits Beverly against a meddling mom and arch rival Betsy Rubenstone (Annie Mumolo), who's planning her own perfect child's Ivy League college admittance. Meanwhile, Erica tells Pops that her efforts to enhance her college prospects are based on lies she made up throughout the years pretending to be in different school clubs like the debate team. Elsewhere, Murray and Adam encounter problems at a video store while renting the video Indiana Jones and the Temple of Doom for Adam. However, they are forced to pay an expensive late fee for a copy of Slap Shot that was never returned, much to Adam's dismay. This causes problems when Murray is banned from the store, but he later signs Adam up for a membership at the store, much to his delight. Featured Song: "Africa" by Toto Guest Starring: Martin Starr as Andre Notes: No date is announced at the beginning of the episode.; The episode is dedicated "in loving memory of the video store 1980-2013".
14	14	"You Opened the Door"	David Katzenberg	Alex Barnow & Marc Firek	January 21, 2014	113	4.71
Adam and Dana attend their first school dance together, but he has to deal with the potentially embarrassing situation of having his mom chaperoning at the event. However, Adam has Erica keep Beverly distracted by scrapbooking with her so she can't go, but her plan backfires and Beverly attends anyway. Adam chastises her to leave, but when he finds Dana's mom is there as well dancing, he catches up to her to apologize and for her to bring life to the party. Meanwhile, Murray tries to have the "birds and the bees" talk with Barry when he was supposed to have it with Adam, so it doesn't go well as planned. Featured Songs: "The Search is Over" by Survivor, "The Safety Dance" by Men Without Hats Notes: The date at the beginning of the episode is announced as "November 22nd".; The episode is dedicated to "the mother/son slow dance".
15	15	"Muscles Mirsky"	Claire Scanlon	Matt Tarses	February 4, 2014	114	4.93
When Barry tells Adam that men and women can't be friends, Adam now thinks he can't be friends with lifelong friend Emmy Mirsky. Meanwhile, Beverly doesn't trust Erica to doing things independently after snooping in Erica's room and finding a fake diary entry. But Beverly gives her a chance to be independent, however, Erica lies that she's going to the movies with best friend Lainey (AJ Michalka), when she actually goes to a college toga party wearing only her bed sheet. Murray and Beverly soon find out and go save an embarrassed Erica. Featured Song: "Kyrie" by Mr. Mister Notes: The date at the beginning of the episode is announced as "February 6th".; The episode is dedicated to "Emmy 'Muscles' Mirsky".; First appearance of AJ Michalka as Lainey Lewis, Erica's best friend and classmate and Barry's love interest. She would go on to become a series regular and featured in the main cast.; First appearance of Stephanie Katherine Grant as Adam's friend and classmate, Emmy Mirsky.
16	16	"Goldbergs Never Say Die!"	David Katzenberg	Adam F. Goldberg & Aaron Kaczander	March 4, 2014	117	4.16
Inspired by The Goonies, Adam hears about some missing family jewelry from Beverly's mom. Erica and Barry having had enough of Adam's obsession with the adventure film, decide to play a little joke and use it to their advantage by teasing their little brother. While cleaning the attic, Adam stumbles upon a "treasure map" that his two siblings have secretly planted. He recruits Erica, and Barry along with his girlfriend, Dana Caldwell, best friends Chad Kremp and Emmy Mirsky, and friend Dave Kim (Kenny Ridwan) to search it, setting out on a quest to find the "treasure"...on their bikes of course. Meanwhile, Beverly is curious where the jewelry is, so she asks Pops for it while the gang are out searching for it. After looking for the jewelry everywhere, they find it in Murray's office. Later, Pops buys out the Waffle House and buys all the women waffles on the house. Featured Song: "The Goonies 'R' Good Enough" by Cyndi Lauper Notes: The date at the beginning of the episode is announced as "February 22nd".; The episode is dedicated to "Dave Kim (and that one time [they] hung out)".; First appearance of Kenny Ridwan as Adam's friend and classmate Dave Kim. He would go on to become a series regular.
17	17	"Lame Gretzky"	David Katzenberg	Chris Bishop	March 11, 2014	115	4.41
Adam tries to improve his less-than-capable ice hockey skills to please his father, but Beverly insists that Murray indulge in Adam's real passion--making movies. Barry teaches Adam how to be a useful member of his hockey team despite his limited skills by turning him into an "enforcer", but this only gets Adam suspended for fighting in the next game. However, Murray does help Adam with his making his movies and even acts in one. Meanwhile, Erica reveals she has a shot at a Stanford-worthy SAT score, but Beverly wants Erica to attend college close to home and tries to sabotage Erica's test preparation. In the end, Erica sees through her mother's attempts and gets a high enough SAT score to attend the prestigious university. Featured Song: "In a Big Country" by Big Country Guest Starring: Tanner Buchanan as Evan Turner Notes: The date at the beginning of the episode is announced as "February 25th".; The episode is dedicated to "the greatest star of [his] home movies", Murray.
18	18	"For Your Own Good"	Victor Nelli	Niki Schwartz-Wright	March 18, 2014	116	4.74
When Beverly gets rid of Murray's favorite chair that he sits in everyday and donates it to Goodwill, he strikes back, creating a war between the two when they get rid of several things that the other loves. Meanwhile, Barry tries to rescue Adam on the school bus after he gets bullied by an eighth grader named J.C. Spink (Cooper Roth). However, Barry later becomes Adam's next school bus bully and pretends the bus is his territory. Featured Song: "Glory of Love" by Peter Cetera Guest Starring: Mason Cook as Tyler Stansfield Notes: The date at the beginning of the episode is announced as "March 7th".; The episode is dedicated to "the real Mr. Chair".; The real J.C. Spink appears in the episode as Joe the Bus Driver.; This is the first episode that has Glory of Love by Peter Cetera.
19	19	"The President's Fitness Test"	Victor Nelli	Chris Bishop & Aaron Kaczander	April 1, 2014	118	4.68
Adam is frightened about doing the President's Fitness Test at school, especially pull-ups since he can't do one. Beverly doesn't think he should have to, so she plans to go directly to President Reagan, much to Murray's dismay. When Adam takes a fake note, Coach Mellor (Bryan Callen) pushes the test until he gets better. After learning about the note from Beverly, Murray tells Adam a story about him trying to avoiding swim class in school every day because he never learned to swim, but he fought through it and puts Adam through training. Though it turns out Murray lied and still can't swim, Adam does compete in the test and manages to do one pull-up. After Murray trains him for the fitness test, Adam teaches Murray how to swim. Barry attempts to make friends with Erica's French pen pal Fanny Martins de Barros (Bella Dayne) who is visiting, but Erica chooses to humiliate him by giving him silly things to say in French. Barry unknowingly raps a song about peeing the bed, and Erica's pen pal chuckles at him. In the end, the pen pal kisses Barry twice on the cheeks, and he misinterprets it and chases her down at the airport. Featured Song: "Eye of the Tiger" by Survivor Guest Starring: David Hornsby as Kyle Schnitz, Dustin Ybarra as Nitrous, Mason Cook as Tyler Stansfield, Cooper Roth as J.C. Spink Notes: The date at the beginning of the episode is announced as "April 8th".; The episode is dedicated to "Fanny, the best pen pal ever".; First appearance of Bryan Callen as Coach Rick Mellor, the school's physical education teacher. He would go on to become a series regular on this show and its spin-off, Schooled.; Final appearance of Cooper Roth as J.C. Spink. Starting with season 2, he is played by Zayne Emory.
20	20	"You're Not Invited"	Michael Patrick Jann	Lew Schneider	April 8, 2014	119	4.45
Adam is excited about his Laser Tag birthday party but also badly wants a first kiss with Dana, so Barry helps him plan a make-out party instead. Elsewhere, Murray and Pops are captivated by the opening of Al Capone's vault, but Capone's vault is empty, much to Pop's disappointment. Murray later gives Adam a laser tag gift in front of his friends, and Adam rejects the present as if it's uncool. After learning about the make-out party from Erica, Beverly tries to crash it to stop Adam from kissing Dana in front his friends Dave Kim, Chad Kremp and Emmy Mirsky. Embarrassed over almost kissing in front of Adam's mom, Dana calls Adam a big idiot for not having a laser tag party. In the end, the group finally plays Laser Tag with Murray's gift. Dave Kim tries to shoots Dana, but Adam takes the shot for her to keep her "alive", and they finally share their first kiss. Featured Song: "Just Like Heaven" by The Cure Guest Starring: Kenny Ridwan as Dave Kim Notes: The date at the beginning of the episode is announced as "mid-April".; The episode is dedicated to Adam's "first make-out party".
21	21	"The Age of Darkness"	Roger Kumble	Stacy Harman & Andrew Secunda	April 29, 2014	120	4.81
Drew Kremp, Erica's new boyfriend, dream guy, dream date and "first love", dumps her and she cannot be consoled. When Beverly's attempt to make Drew jealous by setting up Erica with a college guy fails, it is Murray who surprisingly steps in to help Erica recover from the break up. Meanwhile, Barry becomes obsessed with a new game at the arcade called Punch Out, causing him to steal from Pops and Adam to fuel his relentless pursuit for quarters. After a failed intervention that results in Barry's greed only getting stronger, Adam unplugs the game just as Barry is getting ready to defeat it once and for all, and he stops playing the game. Featured Song: "The Power of Love" by Huey Lewis and the News Guest Starring: Jennifer Irwin as Virginia Kremp, Luke Benward as Bruce Kaczander, Tyler Stokes as Drew Kremp Notes: The date at the beginning of the episode is announced as "April 29th", the first time in the show's run it matched the original air date.; The episode is dedicated to "Drew Kremp: Heartbreaker".; The Bruce Kaczander character is based on series writer and co-producer Aaron Kaczander's father.
22	22	"A Wrestler Named Goldberg"	Ken Marino	Sally Bradford & Vanessa McCarthy	May 6, 2014	121	4.15
Murray and Pops convince Barry to lie to Beverly when he joins the school's wrestling team when persuaded by Coach Mellor. Murray tries to teach Barry some wrestling moves, but Barry is only interested in doing WWF-style attacks on his opponent. When Beverly finds out that Barry is wrestling, she embarrasses him by grappling with him at a school meet, trying to prevent him from facing his opponent. In the end, a furious Barry takes out his aggression on his opponent, quickly pinning him and winning the match, much to Murray, Beverly, Pops and Coach Muller's delight and excitement. Elsewhere, Erica sits in line with Adam for tickets to the premiere of Return of the Jedi, reluctantly admitting that she too likes the Star Wars movie series. But she upsets Adam by leaving their place in line to be with some classmates, who walk by while Adam is in the bathroom. After seeing the disappointment in his eyes, Erica gets the manager to sneak them into the movie theater, much to Adam's delight. Featured Song: "The Final Countdown" by Europe Guest Starring: Bryan Callen as Coach Rick Mellor, Thomas Lennon as Tauntaun Todd Notes: No date is announced at the beginning of the episode.; The episode is dedicated to "The Ultimate Warrior".
23	23	"Livin' on a Prayer"	Claire Scanlon	Chris Bishop & Adam F. Goldberg	May 13, 2014	122	4.26
When Murray's high school basketball free throw record is broken, Beverly takes him out of town to have him introduced during a game in honor of his old record. But when Murray badly misses an honorary free throw, he takes his embarrassment out on Beverly. Barry throws a party to impress his crush Lexy Bloom, but the party starts out quite lame. Pops convinces Erica to invite some of her friends to help out her brother when he is bored. Those friends invite other friends, and the house becomes one giant sweater party with everyone wearing Beverly's cheesy sweaters. It all goes awry and the fun must come to end (or so Erica thinks) when Murray and Beverly come home early. Despite his anger, Murray lets Barry have 10 minutes of glory after Barry told him it was about his time to shine. Barry uses this 10 minutes to dance Barry style to "Livin' on a Prayer", during which Lainey kisses Barry, in an attempt to help get Lexi jealous. After Barry has his fun, Beverly grounds him for the rest of the summer. Featured Song: "Livin' on a Prayer" by Bon Jovi Guest Starring: Dustin Ybarra as Nitrous Notes: No date is announced at the beginning of the episode.; The episode is dedicated to Adam's "real family", followed by a montage of Adam's home video clips played side-by-side with the show's re-enactments of them.
