= The Goldbergs season 3 =

The Goldbergs
- Season 3
- DVD cover
- Starring: Wendi McLendon-Covey; Sean Giambrone; Troy Gentile; Hayley Orrantia; AJ Michalka; George Segal; Jeff Garlin
- No. of episodes: 24

Release
- Original network: ABC
- Original release: September 23, 2015 – May 18, 2016

Season chronology
- ← Previous; Season 2 Next → Season 4

The third season of the American television comedy series The Goldbergs premiered on ABC on September 23, 2015. The season was produced by Adam F. Goldberg Productions, Happy Madison Productions, and Sony Pictures Television, and the executive producers are Adam F. Goldberg, Doug Robinson, and Seth Gordon.

The show explores the daily lives of the Goldberg family, a family living in Jenkintown, Pennsylvania in the 1980s. Beverly Goldberg (Wendi McLendon-Covey), the overprotective matriarch of the Goldbergs is married to Murray Goldberg (Jeff Garlin). They are the parents of three children, Erica (Hayley Orrantia), Barry (Troy Gentile), and Adam (Sean Giambrone).

ABC renewed The Goldbergs for its third season on May 7, 2015.

== Plot ==
Adam, going through puberty and his final year of junior high school, tries to keep a long-distance relationship going with Dana, who has moved to Seattle with her family, and although she returns to town a few times, they agree things don't feel the same and they break up. High school senior Erica continues to think about college and applies to a few more places, and she rejects multiple advances from Barry's friend and JTP member Geoff Schwartz. The season ends with Adam graduating from 8th grade and Erica figuring out she has some feelings for Geoff ... only to find out he moved on to someone else instead.

== Cast ==
=== Main cast ===
- Wendi McLendon-Covey as Beverly Goldberg
- Sean Giambrone as Adam Goldberg
- Troy Gentile as Barry Goldberg
- Hayley Orrantia as Erica Goldberg
- AJ Michalka as Lainey Lewis
- George Segal as Albert "Pops" Solomon
- Jeff Garlin as Murray Goldberg

=== Recurring cast ===
- Tim Meadows as Mr. Glascott
- Stephen Tobolowsky as Principal Ball
- Bryan Callen as Mr. Mellor
- David Koechner as Bill Lewis
- Judd Hirsch as Ben "Pop-Pop" Goldberg
- Jennifer Irwin as Virginia Kremp
- Natalie Alyn Lind as Dana Caldwell
- Kenny Ridwan as Dave Kim
- Stephanie Katherine Grant as Emmy Mirsky
- Nathan Gamble as Garry Ball
- Sean Marquette as Johnny Atkins
- Quincy Fouse as Taz Money
- Matt Bush as Andy Cogan
- Sam Lerner as Geoff Schwartz
- Noah Munck as "Naked Rob" Smith

== Episodes ==
No. overall	No. in season	Title	Directed by	Written by	Original release date	Prod. code	U.S. viewers (millions)
48	1	"A Kick-Ass Risky Business Party"	Seth Gordon	Chris Bishop	September 23, 2015	301	7.62
Barry, Erica and Lainey want a kick-ass Risky Business style party while Bill is out of town, but after ruining Bill's car, Beverly becomes a "temporary smother" to Lainey and puts their plans on hold, but the overbearing nature leads Lainey to throw the party anyway. Meanwhile, Adam spends too much time on the phone talking to Dana (who is now in Seattle), forcing Murray to cancel his long-distance phone plan, so Adam looks for alternate ways to communicate with Dana, including using the school fax machine and making a video. After Pops reminds Murray he used to call Beverly every night while he was at ROTC, Murray agrees to let Adam call Dana for ten-minute intervals. Featured Songs: "Old Time Rock and Roll" by Bob Seger, "Toy Soldiers" by Martika Notes: The episode is dedicated to "long-distance love".; First episode with AJ Michalka promoted to starring cast.; First of six season co-star appearances of Nate Hartley as classmate Dan Morse.
49	2	"A Chorus Lie"	David Katzenberg	Marc Firek	September 30, 2015	302	7.39
Adam, now going through puberty, wins the solo in the school production of A Chorus Line as the best of a group of equally-changing voices, and after seeing news that Milli Vanilli didn't sing on their albums and lip-synced at all their concerts, Beverly offers the idea of doing the same with the school musical. Meanwhile, Erica reluctantly decides to attend the homecoming dance, choosing to go with band geek Johnny Atkins (Sean Marquette), but after finding out she's one of two girls he's taking, she backs out and asks Geoff to go, but they decide to just hang out at the local Wawa instead. Featured Song: "What I Did for Love" from A Chorus Line, covered by the school chorus Guest Starring: Ana Gasteyer as Miss Cinoman Notes: The episode is dedicated to "the pubening".; First appearance of Sean Marquette as Johnny Atkins, a Rush-loving band geek classmate. He would go on to become a series regular on this show and its spin-off, Schooled.; First appearance of Alex Jennings as Carla Mann, a classmate and on/off girlfriend of Johnny Atkins. She would go on to become a series regular on this show and a guest star on its spin-off, Schooled. This is the first of nine season co-star appearances, with her last name listed as "Natali" for the first few before it was later removed. Her last name would be changed to "Mann" for the remainder of the series.; After having a recurring role in season 2, this is the only appearance of Ana Gasteyer in season 3.; First of five season co-star appearances of Sam Kindseth as classmate David Sirota.
50	3	"Jimmy 5 is Alive"	Lew Schneider	Alex Barnow	October 7, 2015	303	6.60
Inspired by Short Circuit, Adam asks for a robot as a "learning-based project" but is told by Murray and Erica he needs to grow up instead, so he joins Murray watching The Weather Channel. After some encouragement from Pops, Murray and Adam get a robot and try to recreate "Johnny 5" from the movie. Meanwhile, Barry accidentally records a JTP "Monster Jam" session over a recording of his 5th birthday party, devastating Beverly. Featured Song: "Forever Young" by Rod Stewart Absent: AJ Michalka as Lainey Lewis Notes: The episode is dedicated to "the real jampilation".; The episode reveals Erica had a Strawberry Shortcake doll smelling fetish as a kid.
51	4	"I Caddyshacked the Pool"	David Katzenberg	Steve Basilone & Annie Mebane	October 14, 2015	304	6.38
With Adam and his classmates anxious about their changing bodies during swimming, he makes ongoing excuses to avoid it, putting him at risk of failing gym class and repeating 8th grade. Inspired by a scene in Caddyshack, Adam puts a Baby Ruth candy bar in the pool, but Mr. Mellor immediately recognizes the stunt and says it's a serious offense to "caddyshack" the pool. After Emmy frames Dave Kim, Adam confesses and explains why he did it, and the class is allowed to swim with shirts on. Meanwhile, Erica is inspired by the "We Are the World" video and starts a Social Awareness Club at school, while Barry starts his own "Barity" club to raise money for new Air Jordan shoes. Featured Song: "Alive and Kicking" by Simple Minds Note: The episode is dedicated to "Jams".
52	5	"Boy Barry"	David Katzenberg	David Guarascio	October 21, 2015	306	6.48
Erica tells Barry he needs to be more like Boy George to keep his relationship going with Lainey since she's out of his league, which results in a new "Boy Barry" persona, and when he finds out Lainey asked Erica for help changing him, he breaks up with her, forcing Lainey to win him back. Meanwhile, Beverly feels threatened by Murray's growing friendship with Bill Lewis. Featured Song: "Do You Really Want To Hurt Me" by Culture Club Guest Starring: Karan Soni as Randy Mescunda Notes: The episode is dedicated to Adam's "dad's 'Magnum' mustache".; Chuck Norris makes a cameo appearance in the final scene providing voice-over to a letter sent to Barry.
53	6	"Couples Costume"	Jay Chandrasekhar	Andy Secunda	October 28, 2015	307	6.88
With Dana back in town, a more mature Adam wants to go trick-or-treating with her instead of Beverly, and they're tricked by Erica and Barry into visiting a haunted house that proves to be too scary for him to handle. Unfortunately, Dana lost her promise ring somewhere inside and the four attempt to find it, ultimately needing Beverly's help to retrieve it. Beverly also tries to teach her children a lesson by hiding razor blades inside candy, but the plan backfires when Murray gets rid of it. Featured Song: "Shadows of the Night" by Pat Benatar Absent: AJ Michalka as Lainey Lewis Guest Starring: Dustin Ybarra as Nitrous Notes: The date at the beginning of the episode is announced as "October 31st" instead of "October 28th".; The episode is dedicated to "the haunted house [Adam] stupidly brought [his] girlfriend to".; Adam and Dana dress up as Alien and Ellen Ripley, while Beverly dresses up as the Predator.
54	7	"Lucky"	David Katzenberg	Marc Firek	November 11, 2015	308	7.01
After Barry discovers he isn't allergic to dogs as originally thought and Murray lied to get him to stop begging for one, Barry demands one again. Murray visits a shelter and picks up a small white dog that Barry names "Lucky", but the dog seems to like Murray more than him. Meanwhile, Erica throws her annual Troop Beverly Hills pajama party with Lainey and their friends, and although Adam and his friends hope to gain insight on girls by hiding a video camera in Erica's room, an excluded Beverly catches them and ends up doing the spying instead ... and gets caught by Erica. Although she doesn't want Beverly involved in her life after that, Erica will need her later when she, Lainey and Pops get arrested and need to be bailed out of jail. Featured Song: "We Belong" by Pat Benatar Guest Starring: Troy Winbush as Officer Puchinski Note: The episode is dedicated to "the real Lucky".
55	8	"In Conclusion, Thanksgiving"	Jay Chandrasekhar	Dan Levy	November 18, 2015	305	7.08
Beverly wants the whole family together for Thanksgiving, including Murray's father Ben/"Pop-Pop" (Judd Hirsch). Uncle Marvin returns, this time claiming he's almost a fully-licensed chiropractor. Pops looks to turn his "toastmaster general" tradition over to Erica, but Barry wants a fair shot and turns it into a contest. Adam creates a "Cat's in the Cradle" video for Murray, hoping to guilt him into buying a wide-angle lens, but Beverly uses it as an opportunity to rebuild the fractured relationship between Murray and Ben. During a family argument, Murray throws out his back, giving Marvin an opportunity to save the day. Featured Songs: "Never Surrender" by Corey Hart, "Cat's in the Cradle" by Harry Chapin Absent: AJ Michalka as Lainey Lewis Guest Starring: Dan Fogler as Marvin Goldberg Notes: The date at the beginning of the episode is announced as "November 20th" instead of the expected "November 18th".; The episode is dedicated to "all the weirdos who make videos like this...", then Adam's self-recorded video for "Cat's in the Cradle" is shown.; First appearance of Judd Hirsch as Ben "Pop-Pop" Goldberg, who was previously played by Paul Sorvino.
56	9	"Wingmom"	David Katzenberg	Lew Schneider & Marty Abbe-Schneider	December 2, 2015	310	6.46
Barry wants to be a badass fighter pilot straight out of Top Gun, so he enlists in ROTC at school. After Beverly forbids signing the permission form to start basic training, Murray secretly signs it, thinking it will toughen his son up. Unlike the glorious depiction displayed in the movie, it's not what he expected. There's no nicknames or call signs, boot camp is too hard, and Captain Wallace (Marlon Young) calls him a loser and worthless. This causes Beverly to wage war on Wallace and enlists to be his "wingmom" to help her son. Beverly then sees she helped Barry so much through the years that he became a quitter, and he decides to fly solo from now on. Meanwhile, when Adam hangs out with Pops at the mall, they check out a time share presentation in order to get free movie tickets. However, Pops actually gets sucked in by all the amenities and buys a condo in Florida, but Adam hates the idea that his best bud will be away from him for months out of the year. He then tries to bond with Pop Pop to make Pops jealous, and sees Pops having fun hanging with Erica. In the end, Adam realizes that Pops is getting older and should have his own enjoyment elderly people his age needs, and makes his own presentation that shares their good times together, just like the friendship between Goose and Maverick. Featured Song: "Top Gun Anthem" by Harold Faltermeyer Absent: AJ Michalka as Lainey Lewis Guest Starring: Rob Huebel as John Calabasas, Marlon Young as Captain Wallace Notes: The date at the beginning of the episode is announced as "November 22nd" instead of the expected "December 2nd".; The episode is dedicated to "Pops' Florida condo".; Only season co-star appearance of Ben Zelevansky as Dale.
57	10	"A Christmas Story"	Lew Schneider	Lacey Marisa Friedman	December 9, 2015	309	7.02
After seeing the Kremps' getting into the holiday spirit together as one happy family, Beverly wants to be—as she says—"good at family" too. She decides to spice up her family's Jewish traditions and creates "Super Hanukkah". But it's practically the same as Christmas with decorating the house, hanging blue and white lights, and opening presents under a Hanukkah bush on one night. Pops dislikes this new celebration and tries to guilt Beverly into ending it by doling out sad family heirlooms as gifts from his "sack of shame" and singing depressing songs of their people's oppression. Meanwhile, Adam is upset that Barry would rather hang out with Lainey during Winter break than him. Barry shares their brotherly holiday traditions like playing their made-up game of Ball-Ball and watching "A Christmas Story" with his girlfriend instead of his little brother. In an attempt to get Barry to stay, Adam breaks the one rule in the house; never issue Barry a dare because he has no regard for his well-being. Getting the idea from the film, Adam triple-dog dares him to stick his tongue to a frozen tether-ball pole in the backyard, and not only does Barry gets stuck, Adam gets tricked into a hug and gets stuck as well. In the end, the bush burns down, the brothers reconcile, and learning the Kremps' Christmas ham is burnt, Beverly invites them to have dinner with her family at a Chinese restaurant, a Goldberg tradition. Featured Song: "Santa Claus is Comin' to Town" by Neil Diamond Guest Starring: Jacob Hopkins as Chad Kremp Notes: The date at the beginning of the episode is announced as "December 23rd" instead of "December 9th".; The episode is dedicated to the Kremp's [sic] perfect Christmas".; After having a recurring role in season 2, this is the first of only two appearances of Jacob Hopkins in season 3.; Tyler Stokes co-stars as Drew Kremp for the third time after two appearances in season 1. He would make one last appearance in season 8.
58	11	"The Tasty Boys"	Christine Gernon	Steve Basilone & Annie Mebane	January 6, 2016	311	6.61
After seeing Virginia Kremp's new kitchen, Beverly wants to remodel her own kitchen, but afraid of change and a creature of habit, Murray isn't willing to do the makeover. Getting inspiration from Bob Vila, Beverly devises a plan to do the work herself by destroying her old kitchen on purpose to force Murray into fixing it. But he sees through her manipulation and gets Bill to help him put back the kitchen exactly the way it was. In the end, Murray tries to accept change and compromises by putting in a lazy Susan spice rack and trying New Coke. Meanwhile, after making music videos of their favorite rappers, Beastie Boys, Barry and Adam form a super-group called The Tasty Boys. They hold an audition to find their third member who turns out to be Geoff Schwartz, who only joins to impress Erica and winds up with stage fright. At school, the three create a hype train and get to perform at the pep rally in the gym. Musically-inclined Erica, who hides in her room writing chick songs that are not ready to perform, is now jealous of her brothers' attention. However, they spend way too much time on their fresh-style, appearance and getting an entourage, and no time writing songs and rehearsing. After Geoff leaves the group, Erica steps in to rescue her brothers. She joins Barry and Adam in lip-syncing the Beastie's "Shake Your Rump" in front of all their classmates, and it's a success. Featured Song: "Shake Your Rump" by Beastie Boys Absent: AJ Michalka as Lainey Lewis Note: The episode is dedicated to Beastie Boys.
59	12	"Baio and Switch"	David Katzenberg	Alex Barnow	January 13, 2016	312	6.33
For different reasons, Barry and Erica both sign up to be part of the Hands Across America charity event in their town, which is being coordinated by Coach Meller. However, he is overwhelmed and Beverly takes over so she can get one photo in the newspaper of her and her kids looking happy together, but Barry and Erica decide to drop out of the event. To keep them interested, Beverly lies and says she got Scott Baio to ditch the Philadelphia event and come to Jenkintown. The kids then argue over which one will get to hold Scott Baio's hand. Elsewhere, Adam invites Emmy Mirsky to the Harvest Hop school dance after seeing how upset she is when a boy she liked shuns her. Adam is then shocked to see that Dana has come to town and expects him to take her to the dance. He enlists Pops' help, along with Dave Kim, to develop an elaborate scheme where he can take both girls to the dance without either knowing, but Dana is staying with Emmy and they find out anyway, ending with both girls getting mad at Adam and Dave Kim and refusing to speak to either of them. Adam later takes Murray's advice of "don't be a moron", and apologizes to both girls, saying he didn't want to upset either of them for different reasons. After the apology, Emmy and Dana both accompany Adam to the dance and he was able to do what some of his favorite television show characters couldn't — take two girls to the same dance. Featured Song: "Heaven is a Place on Earth" by Belinda Carlisle Absent: AJ Michalka as Lainey Lewis Guest Starring: Jacob Hopkins as Chad Kremp, Christopher Boyer as Ben Franklin Dude Notes: The date at the beginning of the episode is announced as "the second Wednesday of the month" instead of the expected "January 13th".; The episode is dedicated to Adam "not holding Scott Baio's hand".
60	13	"Double Dare"	David Katzenberg	Chris Bishop	January 20, 2016	314	6.21
Adam and Emmy Mirsky learn that their favorite game show, Double Dare, is coming to their school for auditions and quickly pick each other as partners. However, things go bad when Adam picks Pops as his partner behind Emmy's back. When Emmy finds out, she gets mad at Adam and picks Adam's one-sided rival, "Handsome" Ben, as her partner in retaliation. They land the spot, but Ben reveals to Adam that Emmy has been practicing with Ben two months prior, leaving Adam with no partner because Pops failed the messy obstacle course. This leads to Adam and Emmy fighting with one another until Handsome Ben ditches Emmy for their classmate "Regular" Amy. When Ben and Amy win the audition, Adam sees Emmy crying on the bleachers and they make up. Meanwhile, Murray and Barry are upset by the Eagles' losing streak until Barry is convinced that when Beverly is in the room, the Eagles score, so Beverly starts watching the games with the boys, leaving Murray annoyed because football is his time "away from his wife," and Bev is ruining that. Thus, Beverly asks Bill and Erica to teach her football, and she is able to learn quickly and watch the games. When Beverly finds out how Murray feels, she stops watching the games and, seeing how Beverly is trying to learn one of his hobbies, Murray tries scrapbooking, one of her Bev's hobbies, and it fails. When Beverly finds out, she helps Murray scrapbook, and they both agree that football and scrapbooking are times they need alone and start to give each other some space. Featured Song: "Beautiful Girl" by INXS Absent: AJ Michalka as Lainey Lewis Guest Starring: Froy Gutierrez as Handsome Ben Notes: The date at the beginning of the episode is announced as "fall" instead of the expected "January 20th".; The episode is dedicated to "the real Handsome Ben and Amy".; The real Benjamin "Handsome Ben" Bauman and Amy "Regular Amy" Gross appear as Double Dare producers Zane and Ellen respectively.
61	14	"Lainey Loves Lionel"	Jay Chandrasekhar	Teleplay by : David Guarascio; Story by : Josef Adalian & David Guarascio	February 10, 2016	313	6.19
Despite Lainey insisting that she doesn't want Barry to do anything "crazy" for Valentine's Day, he tries to think of something small yet romantic. Inspired by the music video for Lionel Richie's Hello, Barry tries to sculpt a clay bust of Lainey's head, but he has no artistic talent and all of his creations just look creepy. Adam and his friends want to see the R-rated movie Porky's at the new Multiplex, but he needs Beverly's permission and she strictly forbids it. They decide to buy a ticket to watch Annie, which is playing at the same multiplex, with plans to sneak in and see the sexually graphic film instead. But like his mom says, Adam is a "good boy" and he wusses out. When Murray learns that Adam could have snuck in to see Porky's but didn't, he is disappointed and feels like he's raised a wimp. When Beverly finds out, she grounds Adam and forbids him from calling Dana on Valentine's Day. Upset at Beverly and encouraged by Murray to do something daring, Adam buys a plane ticket to see Dana in Seattle, but he ultimately chickens out when the captain announces there will be major turbulence. Upset, Beverly asks Murray why he told Adam to branch out. Murray responds that they need to raise someone who isn't afraid to take risks and go out on a limb, even if it means disappointing them. Beverly feels bad and Adam apologizes to Murray, then sneaks out to call Dana. Beverly catches him, but decides to let him have a few more minutes, because "he's a good boy." Elsewhere, Geoff Schwartz schemes to get into the friend zone with Erica, thinking she will eventually succumb to his charms and want to be his girlfriend, but Erica shows no signs of doing so and Geoff soon gives up the notion. However, Erica sees Barry and Lainey professing their love for each other and realizes she wants the same thing. Featured Song: "Hello" by Lionel Richie Guest Starring: Allie Grant as Evelyn Silver Note: The episode is dedicated to Adam's "brother the Romeo".
62	15	"Weird Al"	Jay Chandrasekhar	Lauren Bans	February 17, 2016	315	6.39
When Dana comes to town, Adam wants to spend a romantic weekend together and starts with their "greatest hits" of their childhood toys and food. But when that doesn't go over well, he announces they're going to their first concert. But, thinking it's a rock concert, Dana loses interest when Adam gets tickets to his favorite "rock god", "Weird Al" Yankovic, who inspired him to write his own parody songs, including one about Barry in the tune of Wang Chung's "Everybody Have Fun Tonight". At the concert, Dana's lack of enthusiasm shows when Adam meets his "comedian muse" and picks him over her. After seeing Adam and Dana's relationship on the rocks, Beverly demands Al put on a private concert, but he offers advice instead, and she makes a photo slideshow of their memories. The couple realizes that not only did they grow apart, they grew up and don't get each other anymore. Dana says goodbye in the same way Adam won her over two years ago, with a boombox held head high, à la Say Anything..., only she plays Weird Al's "King of Suede". Meanwhile, Barry gets involved in school and signs up to be a peer counselor when Mr. Glascott tries to dissuade him. Barry thinks this means he is a licensed medical psychiatrist and he can advise anyone on anything and they have to listen to him. He starts with JTP's personal issues and gives such horrible advice that Erica steps in, helping them behind Barry's back. She becomes a peer counselor herself after Glascott bribes her with an A in gym. Barry then challenges her to a "counsel-off" and they notice signs of depression in Murray and in order to win, they must be the first one to fix him. In the end, they do make Murray smile and are even there for Adam after losing his first love. Featured Song: "King of Suede" by "Weird Al" Yankovic Absent: AJ Michalka as Lainey Lewis Guest Starring: "Weird Al" Yankovic as himself Notes: The date at the beginning of the episode is announced as "February 12th" instead of the expected "February 17th".; The episode is dedicated to Adam's "hero Weird Al", followed by a montage of Adam's home video clips played side-by-side with the show's re-enactments of them.
63	16	"Edward 'Eddie the Eagle' Edwards"	Jonathan Corn	Dan Levy	February 24, 2016	319	6.45
Vainly thinking he has a shot at his school's Student Athlete of the Year award, only to be dejected and embarrassed when it goes to a much more deserving classmate, Barry resolves to be a champion at something. Inspired by English ski jumper Eddie "The Eagle" Edwards, he sets his sights on multiple Olympic events, but his attempts to succeed at any of them fall flat. Adam, who has always looked up to his older brother's athletic "prowess", notes that Barry is outstanding at "Ball Ball", a home game the two invented. Barry excitedly starts a Ball Ball club at school, only to have the school's star athlete, Rubén Amaro Jr. take over and soundly defeat Barry in every match. Worse, Barry expelled Adam from the club, causing Adam to reconsider the hero worship he's always held for Barry. When Adam angrily voices this to Barry, renouncing him in the process, Barry is despondent and gives up all sports. When Erica reveals to Adam that his worship meant a lot more to Barry than he thought, Adam is convinced to build his brother's spirits back up, and the two boys hold their own Olympics they call "Home Games", featuring every home game they've ever created. Their ridiculous events include, "umbrella boarding", "stationary peddling" and "stair luge". At home, Adam makes his big brother into, "Barry the Eagle", and he wins all the "gold" medals. Elsewhere, Murray has become a penny-pincher at home, and Beverly soon discovers that the furniture store is failing when she sees Murray's employee Vic working in a Photo Hut. Beverly suggests that Murray start selling futons, a hot new furniture item from Japan, but the too-proud Murray refuses her help. Murray eventually caves when Pops tells him a story about his past struggles in the furniture business and getting help from his family. So, for the first time, Murray breaks down and accepts help. Soon, Beverly starts working at the store and easily talks customers into purchasing futons. Featured Song: "Chariots of Fire" by Vangelis Guest Starring: Cedric Yarbrough as Vic, Niko Guardado as Ruben Amaro Jr., Lance Krall as Richard Biggens Notes: The episode is dedicated to "the actual Home Games".; After having a recurring role in season 2, this is the only appearance of Cedric Yarbrough in season 3.
64	17	"The Dirty Dancing Dance"	David Katzenberg	Teleplay by : Adam F. Goldberg; Story by : Adam F. Goldberg & David Guarascio	March 2, 2016	317	7.08
After watching their favorite movie, Dirty Dancing, Erica and Beverly are determined to give the next school dance a Dirty Dancing theme. When Erica makes her case to Principal Ball, however, he strictly forbids it, and insists the dance be a 1950s-themed "soda pop hop" – that is until he sees Beverly leering through his office window, and he caves to avoid a confrontation with her. Meanwhile, Barry is equally determined to have a Footloose theme, insisting that it's a much better dance movie than Dirty Dancing. Murray, who has long resisted dancing, is convinced by Pops that he should try to learn for the sake of Beverly's happiness. Beverly soon backs off from her support of Erica's Dirty Dancing theme when she realizes the dancing may include sexually-oriented "grinding". She pleads her case to Principal Ball, asking that he not tell Erica who called off the theme, but Principal Ball has left the PA system on for the whole school to hear Beverly's pleas. Though embarrassed, Erica is not deterred, stating she and her friends will show up at the dance with every intention of retaining their original theme. At the dance, Geoff Schwartz is determined to be Patrick Swayze to Erica's Jennifer Grey and recreate the iconic "body lift" scene from the film, but it fails badly. Beverly, who is there as a chaperone, ultimately shows support for her daughter, and Erica and Geoff try the dance move again, this time with success. The kids all start dancing, and even Murray, who is also chaperoning, asks Beverly to dance. Featured Songs: "Footloose" by Kenny Loggins, "(I've Had) The Time of My Life" by Bill Medley and Jennifer Warnes Note: The episode is dedicated to "the one time [Adam's] dad actually danced with [Adam's] mom".
65	18	"12 Tapes for a Penny"	David Katzenberg	Steve Basilone & Annie Mebane	March 16, 2016	318	6.69
After seeing how Dave Kim stocked his huge cassette tape collection by getting "12 tapes for a penny" from the Columbia House music service, ordering several times under phony names, Adam tries to do the same. He tries to rope in Erica on the fraud scheme, but she backs out, not wanting to get in trouble, while also telling Adam that Columbia House will lock him into a contract to buy many more tapes at full price. Beverly finds out when a delivery man keeps bringing boxes of 12 tapes to the door, addressed to strange names that Adam made up, and she blames Erica, given all the trouble she's been in before. She grounds Erica for a month and makes Adam a banana split, even though Erica maintains her innocence and Adam tells the truth. Beverly assumes Adam is lying to cover for Erica, but she soon finds out about the real scheme after Pops orders tapes and says he saw Adam doing it, which results in Beverly grounding Adam. Erica, sick of being blamed for everything, attempts to do something worse to tick off her mom: shoplifting with her friend Carla. Beverly soon finds out after Erica gets sent to mall jail, but it turns out Erica backed out and only Carla actually shoplifted. Erica tearfully tells her mother she is tired of always being seen as the bad seed and that Beverly has no idea how much it hurts to be labeled as that by her own mother. Beverly feels awful and Adam gives her a Chicago tape to mend their relationship, with successful results. Meanwhile, Barry is trying to win over Bill Lewis and fails to do so. Murray says all dads despise their daughter's boyfriends and tries to help Barry win over Bill, but it fails when Barry sees Bill treating Lainey's ex-boyfriend nicely. In the end, Barry, with Murray's help, wins over Bill during a round of golf. Featured Song: "Hard to Say I'm Sorry" by Chicago Guest Starring: Charlie DePew as Anthony Balsamo, Steve Berg as Mailman Note: The episode is dedicated to Adam's "awesome tape collection".
66	19	"Magic Is Real"	Jay Chandrasekhar	Teleplay by : Marc Firek; Story by : Kerri Doherty	March 23, 2016	316	6.73
Barry goes to great lengths to avoid taking the PSAT test. He is further disappointed to learn that Lainey and all three of his fellow JTP members are planning to take the test, chastising all of them for giving up on their farfetched dreams. He finally confides in Murray that he is afraid to take the test because he thinks he will fail. He further tells Murray that he's afraid his friends and girlfriend will move on to great things, leaving him behind. Murray assures his son that he will do fine in life, saying he's never known anyone whose mind works like Barry's. Barry then begins studying for the test, to Erica's amazement and Murray & Lainey's satisfaction. Meanwhile, Adam is heartbroken over his breakup with Dana, and is desperate to find another girlfriend. After viewing a David Copperfield special on TV, however, he is convinced that the ladies love magicians. A cute girl at school hires him for her little brother's birthday party, making Adam believe he was right. He convinces Beverly to buy a bunch of expensive items from a magic shop by telling her it is something they can do together. Adam makes Mom his assistant, but later fires her when his friends say it isn't cool to have his mom helping him. At the birthday party, Adam's magic tricks are going poorly, until Beverly arrives to rescue his act. Adam doesn't get the girl, though, as she is in ninth grade and says she cannot date a middle-schooler. Beverly later finds Adam crying over a picture of him and Dana, and he confides in her that he is afraid he will never find a relationship like that again. Beverly consoles him that he will, because Adam's taught her there is plenty of magic in the world. Featured Song: "Magic" by The Cars Guest Starring: Froy Gutierrez as Handsome Ben, Makenna James as "New" Dana Note: The episode is dedicated to "the young magicians of the world".
67	20	"Dungeons and Dragons, Anyone?"	David Katzenberg	Andrew Secunda	April 6, 2016	320	6.17
Adam and his nerdy friends are sick and tired of always being humiliated athletically and being picked last for team sports in gym class. But Adam talks to Coach Mellor about it and he is made team captain. However, after Barry convinces Adam to pick winners, he betrays his loser friends; Dave Kim, David Sirota and "Tiny" Tyler by choosing the popular jocks over the nerds. When Adam and his new friends beat them at basketball, coach wants to make the next class fair and chooses Dave Kim to pick the next game. He picks the popular dice fantasy game Dungeons & Dragons: The Ghost Tower of Inverness tournament module. But the jocks don't know how to play, so Adam has to painstakingly teach them. In the end, both teams end up playing for four hours until it gets down to the last roll. It's up to Adam to take his team home, but decides to throw the game in order to get his friends to respect him again. Meanwhile, Erica decides to go to CMU in Pittsburgh, but Beverly and Murray aren't on board with her choice. Beverly doesn't want her daughter to be that far from home, while Murray is upset that his "princess" will be spending time on campus living with boys. And Pops, who just watched the movie Back to School, is considering going to college himself. Featured Song: "Tenderness" by General Public Absent: AJ Michalka as Lainey Lewis Guest Starring: Mason Cook as Tyler Stansfield, Zach Callison as Brian Corbett, Zayne Emory as J.C. Spink Notes: The episode is dedicated to Adam's "brother's secret love of Dungeons & Dragons".; First appearance of Quincy Fouse as classmate Taz Money. He would go on to become a series regular.; First co-star appearance of Jackie Radinsky as classmate Sergei Tarbokomous. He would go on to become a series regular.
68	21	"Rush"	Beth McCarthy-Miller	Alex Barnow	April 13, 2016	321	6.29
When Beverly gives Adam a "World's Best Son" trophy in the shape of an Oscar for his birthday, Barry complains that Beverly clearly plays favorites among her children. When Beverly eventually learns that Barry is right, she begins to shower him with the same attention she used to give to Adam, and Adam is more than happy to be rid his mom's constant meddling. Elsewhere, Johnny Atkins turns Erica on to his favorite band, Rush, and after listening to "Tom Sawyer", she becomes oddly attracted to him and joins his Rush cover band called "Speed Up". Though Erica soon realizes her attraction to Johnny was a momentary thing, she continues to date him in order to spite her father, Lainey and the JTP, whom she thinks are all trying to run her life. In the end, Erica realizes she doesn't need a boy to achieve her rock n' roll dreams, and recruits Lainey and Carla to join her own Rush cover band, and they perform at the school's Battle of the Bands. Meanwhile, Adam tries to plan the "greatest birthday ever" party by himself and fails, while Barry immediately grows tired of being the new favorite. They turn to Beverly, who makes Adam her favorite again and throws him the most epic middle-school party with everything he's asked for; a Boba Fett walkout, knights sword fighting, a mini horse with mini sneakers, drinks with fog and a camera cake. Featured Song: "Tom Sawyer" by Rush, covered by Hayley Orrantia and AJ Michalka Notes: The date at the beginning of the episode is announced as "April" instead of the expected "April 13th".; The episode is dedicated to Adam's "Best Son trophy".
69	22	"Smother's Day"	David Katzenberg	Story by : Marc Firek; Teleplay by : Chris Bishop	May 4, 2016	323	6.67
When Barry and Erica forget Mother's Day again, they quickly improvise coupons for good deeds to give to Beverly. Fed up, Beverly decides to redeem all the coupons from the two that she has kept over the years, making Barry and Erica miserable. They fight back, which leads to a series of events ending with Beverly heartbrokenly stating that her children can't spend one day a year doing something for her when she spends the rest of the year doing everything for them. Feeling bad, Barry and Erica try to make it up to her by making her breakfast, but accidentally destroy the kitchen in the process. Beverly, however is moved that her children cared enough to try, and all is forgiven. Elsewhere, Adam tries to convince Murray to pay for him to go to Space Camp, but Murray refuses, saying it's too expensive and an impractical dream for Adam to have. At Pops' suggestion, he and Adam visit Pop Pop to find out if there was ever a childhood dream of Murray's that he crushed. Pop Pop reveals that Murray had a ventriloquist's dummy when he was nine, and that he had struck down Murray's dream of performing. Adam then brings the dummy home to try and soften up his father to the Space Camp idea. They get into a fight, where Adam finds out that Murray is a much better father to him than Pop Pop was to Murray. In the end, Murray decides to send Adam to Space Camp, deciding to support his dreams. Featured Song: "Greatest Love of All" by Whitney Houston Notes: The date at the beginning of the episode is announced as "Mother's Day" instead of "May 4th".; The episode is dedicated to "Space Camp".
70	23	"Big Orange"	David Katzenberg	Rob Lieber	May 11, 2016	322	6.20
Frustrated with Barry always wearing his beloved Philadelphia Flyers jersey (Big Orange), Beverly and Lainey mutually agree to "accidentally" ruin it in the washing machine. Barry sees the damage as a "shirt murder" and soon asks Adam and Erica to investigate. Lainey confesses to Erica and when Barry finds out, he breaks up with Lainey and becomes mad at Beverly. Lainey and Beverly, realizing they destroyed Barry's favorite thing and his trust, hold a funeral for Big Orange. Barry gets back together with Lainey and buys a new Big Orange. Meanwhile, Murray plans on tearing down the treehouse and Adam protests, recalling the good times he had in the structure with Erica playing "detective". He strikes a deal with Murray that if he can solve who destroyed Big Orange, the treehouse stays. Adam is all in, but Erica couldn't care less. This leads to a series of events ending with Erica yelling at Adam to give up the game and to grow up. Adam sadly responds that he just wanted him and Erica to hang out like they used to do, making Erica feel bad. In the end, the treehouse is torn down, but Adam and Erica build a new one to make amends. Featured Song: "Walking on Sunshine" by Katrina and the Waves, covered by Hayley Orrantia and AJ Michalka Note: The episode is dedicated to "Ed Snider, Founder of the Flyers", who died on April 11th.
71	24	"Have a Summer"	David Katzenberg	Story by : Adam F. Goldberg; Teleplay by : Chris Bishop	May 18, 2016	324	6.39
Adam and his incoming freshman friends worry about Freshman Fear Week, the last week of school where the seniors haze the incoming high schoolers. However, while his friends get hazed, Adam is approached by Barry and bodyslams his brother, gaining the respect of the seniors and leaving Barry humiliated. When Adam learns from Barry he wanted to be the one to pick on Adam because he didn't get picked on and was resented for it, Adam and Barry pull a prank at the 8th grade graduation ceremony that erases all memory of Barry being bodyslammed. Meanwhile, Geoff Schwartz schemes to get Erica to be his girlfriend. She keeps refusing until she and Beverly, trying to dig up a time capsule, get both her and Geoff suspended for a day because a water pipe broke in the process. In the end, after hearing a mixtape Geoff made her, Erica realizes she likes Geoff and goes to tell him. However, Erica sees Geoff has finally moved on after her multiple rejections, and is dating Evelyn Silver, causing Erica to quietly walk away. Featured Song: "Heat of the Moment" by Asia Guest Starring: Allie Grant as Evelyn Silver Notes: The date at the beginning of the episode is announced as "June 2nd" instead of "May 18th".; The episode is dedicated to Adam's "real family", followed by a montage of Adam's home video clips played side-by-side with the show's re-enactments of them.; The episode is also dedicated to the memory of writer Michelle McNamara, wife of Patton Oswalt, who died on April 21st.

== Ratings ==
No.	Title	Air date	Time slot (EST)	Ratings/Share (18–49)	Viewers (millions)	Viewers Rank (Week)	DVR 18–49	DVR Viewers (millions)	Total 18–49	Total viewers (millions)	Ref
1	"A Kick-Ass Risky Business Party"	September 23, 2015	Wednesdays; 8:30 pm	2.4/8	7.69	33	1.2	2.430	3.6	10.049	
2	"A Chorus Lie"	September 30, 2015	Wednesdays; 8:30 pm	2.4/8	7.39	35	1.0	2.296	3.4	9.685	
3	"Jimmy 5 is Alive"	October 7, 2015	Wednesdays; 8:30 pm	2.1/7	6.60	35	1.0	—N/a	3.1	—N/a	
4	"I Caddyshacked the Pool"	October 14, 2015	Wednesdays; 8:30 pm	2.0/7	6.38	39	1.0	—N/a	3.0	—N/a	
5	"Boy Barry"	October 21, 2015	Wednesdays; 8:30 pm	2.1/7	6.48	41	0.9	—N/a	3.0	—N/a	
6	"Couples Costume"	October 28, 2015	Wednesdays; 8:30 pm	2.2/7	6.88	37	1.0	—N/a	3.2	—N/a	
7	"Lucky"	November 11, 2015	Wednesdays; 8:30 pm	2.1/7	7.01	34	1.1	—N/a	3.2	—N/a	
8	"In Conclusion, Thanksgiving"	November 18, 2015	Wednesdays; 8:30 pm	2.2/7	7.08	36	1.0	—N/a	3.2	—N/a	
9	"Wingmom"	December 2, 2015	Wednesdays; 8:30 pm	2.0/6	6.46	—N/a	1.1	2.252	3.1	8.710	
10	"A Christmas Story"	December 9, 2015	Wednesdays; 8:30 pm	2.0/7	7.02	28	0.9	2.174	2.9	9.191	
11	"The Tasty Boys"	January 6, 2016	Wednesdays; 8:30 pm	2.1/7	6.61	35	1.0	2.174	3.1	8.786	
12	"Baio and Switch"	January 13, 2016	Wednesdays; 8:30 pm	2.0/6	6.33	34	0.9	2.003	2.9	8.330	
13	"Double Dare"	January 20, 2016	Wednesdays; 8:30 pm	2.0/6	6.21	35	0.8	—N/a	2.8	—N/a	
14	"Lainey Loves Lionel"	February 10, 2016	Wednesdays; 8:30 pm	2.0/7	6.19	38	0.9	—N/a	2.9	—N/a	
15	"Weird Al"	February 17, 2016	Wednesdays; 8:30 pm	2.0/7	6.39	28	0.9	—N/a	2.9	—N/a	
16	"Edward 'Eddie the Eagle' Edwards"	February 24, 2016	Wednesdays; 8:30 pm	1.9/6	6.45	33	0.9	—N/a	2.8	—N/a	
17	"The Dirty Dancing Dance"	March 2, 2016	Wednesdays; 8:30 pm	2.1/7	7.08	22	0.8	—N/a	2.9	—N/a	
18	"12 Tapes for a Penny"	March 16, 2016	Wednesdays; 8:30 pm	2.0/7	6.69	22	—N/a	—N/a	—N/a	—N/a	
19	"Magic is Real"	March 23, 2016	Wednesdays; 8:30 pm	2.0/7	6.73	—N/a	—N/a	—N/a	—N/a	—N/a	
20	"Dungeons and Dragons, Anyone?"	April 6, 2016	Wednesdays; 8:30 pm	1.8/6	6.17	—N/a	—N/a	—N/a	—N/a	—N/a	
21	"Rush"	April 13, 2016	Wednesdays; 8:30 pm	1.9/7	6.29	—N/a	—N/a	—N/a	—N/a	—N/a	
22	"Smother's Day"	May 4, 2016	Wednesdays; 8:30 pm	1.9/7	6.67	—N/a	—N/a	—N/a	—N/a	—N/a	
23	"Big Orange"	May 11, 2016	Wednesdays; 8:30 pm	1.9/7	6.20	—N/a	—N/a	—N/a	—N/a	—N/a	
24	"Have a Summer"	May 18, 2016	Wednesdays; 8:30 pm	1.9/7	6.39	—N/a	—N/a	—N/a	—N/a	—N/a	
