= American Woman (TV series) =

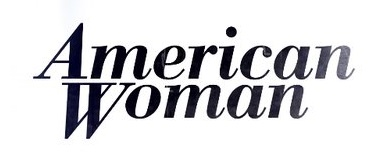
- Genre: Sitcom
- Created by: John Riggi
- Starring: Alicia Silverstone; Mena Suvari; Jennifer Bartels; Makenna James; Lia McHugh
- Composers: Michael Suby; John Swihart
- Country of origin: United States
- Original language: English
- No. of seasons: 1
- No. of episodes: 11

Production
- Executive producers: John Wells; John Riggi; Alex Hardcastle
- Producers: Lisa Cochran-Neilan; Marc Solakian
- Cinematography: John Inwood
- Editors: Richard Candib; Lawrence Maddox; Justin Chinn; Lizzy Calhoun
- Camera setup: Single-camera
- Running time: 19–26 minutes
- Production companies: John Wells Productions; Warner Horizon Television

Original release
- Network: Paramount Network
- Release: June 7 – August 23, 2018

American Woman is an American sitcom inspired by the childhood of actress and reality star Kyle Richards that premiered on June 7, 2018, on Paramount Network. The series was created by John Riggi and stars Alicia Silverstone, Mena Suvari, Jennifer Bartels, Makenna James, and Lia McHugh. On September 5, 2018, it was announced that the series had been cancelled after one season.

== Premise ==
American Woman follows "Bonnie, an unconventional mother struggling to raise her two daughters after leaving her husband amid the rise of second-wave feminism in the 1970s. With the help of her two best friends, Kathleen and Diana, these three women each discover their own brand of independence in a glamorous and ever-changing world reluctant to give it."

== Cast and characters ==
=== Main ===
- Alicia Silverstone as Bonnie Nolan
- Mena Suvari as Kathleen Callahan
- Jennifer Bartels as Diana Vaughan
- Makenna James as Becca Nolan, Bonnie and Steve's elder daughter
- Lia McHugh as Jessica Nolan, Bonnie and Steve's younger daughter

=== Recurring ===
- Sam Morgan as Adam
- James Tupper as Steve Nolan, Bonnie's husband whom she throws out after catching him with another woman
- Cheyenne Jackson as Greg, Kathleen's boyfriend who is secretly gay
- Diandra Lyle as Louise
- Tobias Jelinek as Mr. Bishop
- Patrick Bristow as Randall
- Jonathan Chase as Alan
- Christine Estabrook as Peggy, Diana's Mother

=== Guest ===
- Sam Anderson as Raymond Turner ("Changes and The New Normal")
- Elizabeth Bogush as Sherry ("Changes and The New Normal")
- Audrey Wasilewski as Anne ("Changes and The New Normal")
- Chosen Jacobs as William ("The Heat Wave")
- Jon Prescott as Barry ("The Agreement")
- Carter MacIntyre as Harris ("The Agreement")
- Matt Knudsen as Dr. Taylor ("Jack")
- Peta Sergeant as Hannah ("Jack")
- Cullen Douglas as Philip ("The Breakthrough")
- Bob Glouberman as Mr. Knave ("The Breakthrough")
- Matthew Glave as Cal ("Obstacles and Assets")
- Laura Regan as Carol ("I Will Survive")

== Episodes ==
No.	Title	Directed by	Written by	Original release date	Prod. code	U.S. viewers (millions)
1	"Liberation"	Alex Hardcastle	John Riggi	June 7, 2018	U11.10047	0.595
2	"Changes and the New Normal"	Iain B. MacDonald	John Riggi & Becky Hartman Edwards	June 14, 2018	U13.12702 / U13.12703	0.357
3	"The Party"	Alex Hardcastle	John Riggi	June 21, 2018	U13.12704	0.381
4	"The Cost of Living"	Joanna Kerns	Mike Herro & David Strauss	June 28, 2018	U13.12705	0.338
5	"Adam"	Alex Hardcastle	John Riggi & Jen Braeden	July 12, 2018	U13.12706	0.322
6	"The Heat Wave"	Liza Johnson	Jen Braeden	July 19, 2018	U13.12707	0.347
7	"The Agreement"	Mary Lou Belli	Hilary Helding & Thomas Reyes	July 26, 2018	U13.12708	0.297
8	"Jack"	Alethea Jones	Lauren Caltagirone	August 2, 2018	U13.12709	0.388
9	"The Breakthrough"	Alex Hardcastle	John Riggi & Lauren Caltagirone	August 9, 2018	U13.12710	0.322
10	"Obstacles and Assets"	Alex Hardcastle	Mike Herro & David Strauss	August 16, 2018	U13.12711	0.332
11	"I Will Survive"	Alex Hardcastle	John Riggi	August 23, 2018	U13.12712	0.326

== Production ==
=== Development ===
On June 2, 2015, it was announced that TV Land was developing a television pilot inspired by the life of The Real Housewives of Beverly Hills star Kyle Richards. The pilot was set to be produced by John Wells Productions in association with Warner Horizon Television. Executive producers included John Wells and John Riggi, who wrote the pilot script.

On November 7, 2016, it was announced that TV Land had given the production a series order for a first season consisting of 12 episodes, but a premiere date had not been set.

On March 30, 2017, it was revealed that the series had been shifted from TV Land to the newly rebranded Paramount Network. On August 14, 2017, it was announced that John Riggi had departed the series citing creative differences. Replacing him in the role of showrunner was fellow executive producer John Wells. On January 16, 2018, it was announced at the annual Television Critics Association's winter press tour that the series would premiere on June 7, 2018. On September 5, 2018, it was announced that the series had been canceled after one season.

=== Casting ===
On July 25, 2016, it was announced that Alicia Silverstone had been cast in the series lead role. On August 11, 2016, Mena Suvari joined the pilot in another lead role. Later that month, it was reported that Cheyenne Jackson and Jennifer Bartels had also joined the cast. In May 2017, Diandra Lyle was cast as Louise, a recurring role. On June 13, 2017, it was announced that Sam Morgan had joined the cast in a recurring capacity.

=== Filming ===
Principal photography for the first season of the series began in April 2017 in Los Angeles, California.

=== Theme Song ===
The show's theme song was a cover version of the 1970 The Guess Who song, American Woman. The song was performed by Kelly Clarkson.

== Release ==
=== Marketing ===
On March 27, 2018, Paramount Network released six "first look" images from the series. On May 3, 2018, the first official trailer for the series was released. On May 17, 2018, it was announced that a cover of the song "American Woman" had been recorded by singer Kelly Clarkson. It was subsequently used in marketing material for the series.

=== Premiere ===
On April 29, 2018, the series held its official world premiere during the Series Mania Festival in Lille, France in which the first three episodes of the first season were screened. It competed against nine other international television programs in the festival's "official competition" series of shows.

On June 7, 2018, the series held a screening at the annual ATX Television Festival in Austin, Texas. A question-and-answer panel followed, featuring executive producer Josh Wells, cast members Alicia Silverstone, Mena Suvari, Jennifer Bartels, and co-executive producer Kyle Richards.

== Reception ==
=== Critical response ===
The series has received a mixed reception from critics upon its premiere. On the review aggregation website Rotten Tomatoes, the series holds a 44% approval rating with an average rating of 5.36 out of 10 based on 18 reviews. The website's critical consensus reads, "Stereotypes and ambiguity shadow the well-meaning intentions of American Woman, though the nostalgic period setting is cute." Metacritic, which uses a weighted average, assigned the series a score of 48 out of 100 based on 10 critics, indicating "mixed or average reviews".

=== Ratings ===
Viewership and ratings per episode of American Woman
No.	Title	Air date	Rating (18–49)	Viewers (millions)	DVR (18–49)	DVR viewers (millions)	Total (18–49)	Total viewers (millions)
1	"Liberation"	June 7, 2018	0.2	0.595	0.2	0.479	0.4	1.074
2	"Changes and the New Normal"	June 14, 2018	0.1	0.357	0.1	0.357	0.2	0.714 (Note: Live +7 ratings were not available, so Live +3 ratings have been used instead.)
3	"The Party"	June 21, 2018	0.12	0.381	0.2	0.586	0.3	0.967
4	"The Cost of Living"	June 28, 2018	0.1	0.338	0.1	0.463	0.2	0.801
5	"Adam"	July 12, 2018	0.1	0.322	0.2	0.582	0.3	0.904
6	"The Heat Wave"	July 19, 2018	0.12	0.347	0.2	0.505	0.3	0.852
7	"The Agreement"	July 26, 2018	0.08	0.297	—N/a	0.510	—N/a	0.807
8	"Jack"	August 2, 2018	0.13	0.388	TBD	TBD	TBD	TBD
9	"The Breakthrough"	August 9, 2018	0.1	0.322	TBD	TBD	TBD	TBD
10	"Obstacles and Assets"	August 16, 2018	0.07	0.332	TBD	TBD	TBD	TBD
11	"I Will Survive"	August 23, 2018	0.06	0.326	TBD	TBD	TBD	TBD
