= Makenna James =

American actress

Makenna James is an American actress, known for her role as Becca Nolan in American Woman (2018).

== Career ==
Makenna James was born in Los Angeles, California. In 2014, James made her acting debut when she guest-starred on How to Get Away with Murder. Since then, she has appeared on Teen Wolf, The Goldbergs, Transparent, and Community. Her breakthrough role was in 2018, when she was cast as Becca Nolan in the television series, American Woman. She plays the rebellious and intellectual daughter of Bonnie Nolan played by Alicia Silverstone.

== Education ==
Makenna James attended Harvard University.

== Filmography ==
Television
Year	Title	Role	Notes
2014	How to Get Away With Murder	Mia Thomas	
2014	Divide & Conquer	Caroline Burrows	Television film
2015	Community	Sister	
2015	Teen Wolf	Theo's Sister	
2015	I Didn't Do It	Quinn	
2016	The Goldbergs	Sharon	
2016	Chad: An American Boy	Chloe	Television film
2014–2016	Transparent	Young Sarah	Recurring; 3 episodes
2017	The Mick	Ali	
2018	American Woman	Becca Nolan	Main role; 11 episodes
2019	Hawaii Five-0	Bonnie Pearson	1 episode
