= Zayne Emory =

American actor and singer (born 1998)

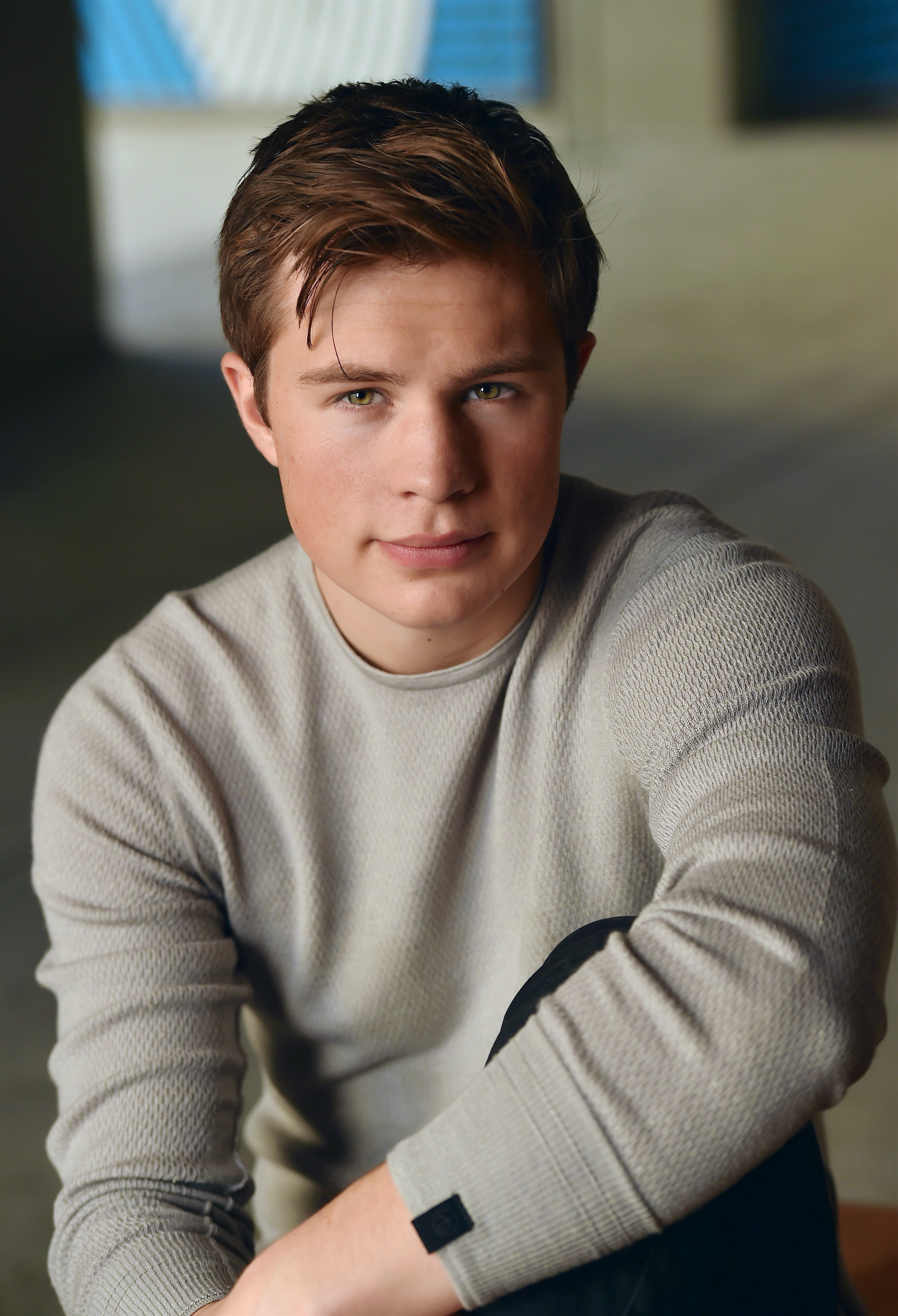
- Born: Rodney Zayne Emory; June 3, 1998 (age 28); McMinnville, Oregon, U.S.
- Occupations: Actor; singer
- Years active: 2009–present

Zayne Emory (born June 3, 1998) is an American actor and singer. He is known for his role as J. C. Spink in the ABC's situation comedy The Goldbergs.

== Biography ==
Emory was born in McMinnville, Oregon. He developed an interest in acting from an early age. While in elementary school, Emory won a 2007 Gallery Theater Award for Outstanding Youth Debut and a 2008 Oregon State Double Grand Championship at a Youth Focus Talent show. He made his screen debut at the age of eleven in a 2009 episode of Criminal Minds. After that, Emory had roles in other shows like Desperate Housewives, Ghost Whisperer, and CSI: Miami. In 2010, he also joined the cast of the music comedy show I'm in the Band in the role of Charles "Chucky" Albertson. Emory earned the Young Artist Award in 2011 and 2012 for the role. He was also nominated for his role in Shake It Up and A.N.T. Farm in 2014.

Aside from TV, Emory has also appeared in several feature films. He made his film debut in 2011 in the romantic comedy Crazy, Stupid, Love, starring Steve Carell, Ryan Gosling, and Julianne Moore. After that, he has appeared in other films like Little Loopers and Maximum Ride. Since 2016, Emory has had several recurring roles in shows like 24: Legacy, Supergirl, Runaways, Crazy Ex-Girlfriend, and The Rookie. In 2015, he was cast as J. C. Spink, replacing Cooper Roth, for the second season of ABC's situation comedy The Goldbergs.

== Filmography ==
=== Film ===
Year	Title	Role	Notes
2011	Crazy, Stupid, Love	Eric, Robbie's Friend	
2015	Little Loopers	David	
2016	Maximum Ride	Iggy	
2020	American Pie Presents: Girls' Rules	Jason	Direct-to-video

=== Television ===
Year	Title	Role	Notes
2009	Criminal Minds	Ryan	Episode: "Haunted"
2010	Desperate Housewives	Patrick (12-year-old)	Episode: "If..."
2010	Ghost Whisperer	Pig Mask Kid	Episode: "The Children's Parade"
2010	The Closer	Avery Disken	Episode: "Help Wanted"
2011	Shake It Up	Howard	Episode: "Sweat It Up"
2011	CSI: Miami	Bobby Nolan	Episode: "Long Gone"
2010–2011	I'm in the Band	Charles "Chucky" Albertson	5 episodes
2011–2012	Shameless	Simon	2 episodes
2012	Shmagreggie Saves the World	Max	Television film
2013	A.N.T. Farm	Graham	Episode: "RestaurANTeur"
2013	Modern Family	Filmgoer	Episode: "Larry's Wife"
2013	Kickin' It	Tad Monaco	Episode: "Queen of Karts"
2014	An American Education	Lance	Television film
2014	See Dad Run	Greg Howard	Episode: "See Dad Become Room Mom"
2015–2018	Crazy Ex-Girlfriend	Brendan Proctor	Recurring role (8 episodes)
2015–2022	The Goldbergs	J. C. Spink	Recurring role (29 episodes)
2016–2018	24: Legacy	Drew Phelps	4 episodes
2016–2017	Supergirl	Young Rick Malverne	2 episodes
2017–2018	Runaways	Brandon	3 episodes
2018	Brimming with Love	Tyler	Television film
2018–present	The Rookie	Henry Nolan	10 episodes

== Awards and nominations ==
Year	Award	Category	Work	Result
2011	Young Artist Awards	Best Performance in a TV Series – Guest Starring Young Actor 11–13	I'm in the Band	Won
2012	Young Artist Awards	Best Performance in a TV Series – Guest Starring Young Actor 11–13	Shake It Up	Nominated
2012	Young Artist Awards	Best Performance in a TV Series – Recurring Young Actor	I'm in the Band	Won
2014	Young Artist Awards	Best Performance in a TV Series – Guest Starring Young Actor 14–16	A.N.T. Farm	Nominated
