= Kenny Ridwan =

American actor (born 1999)

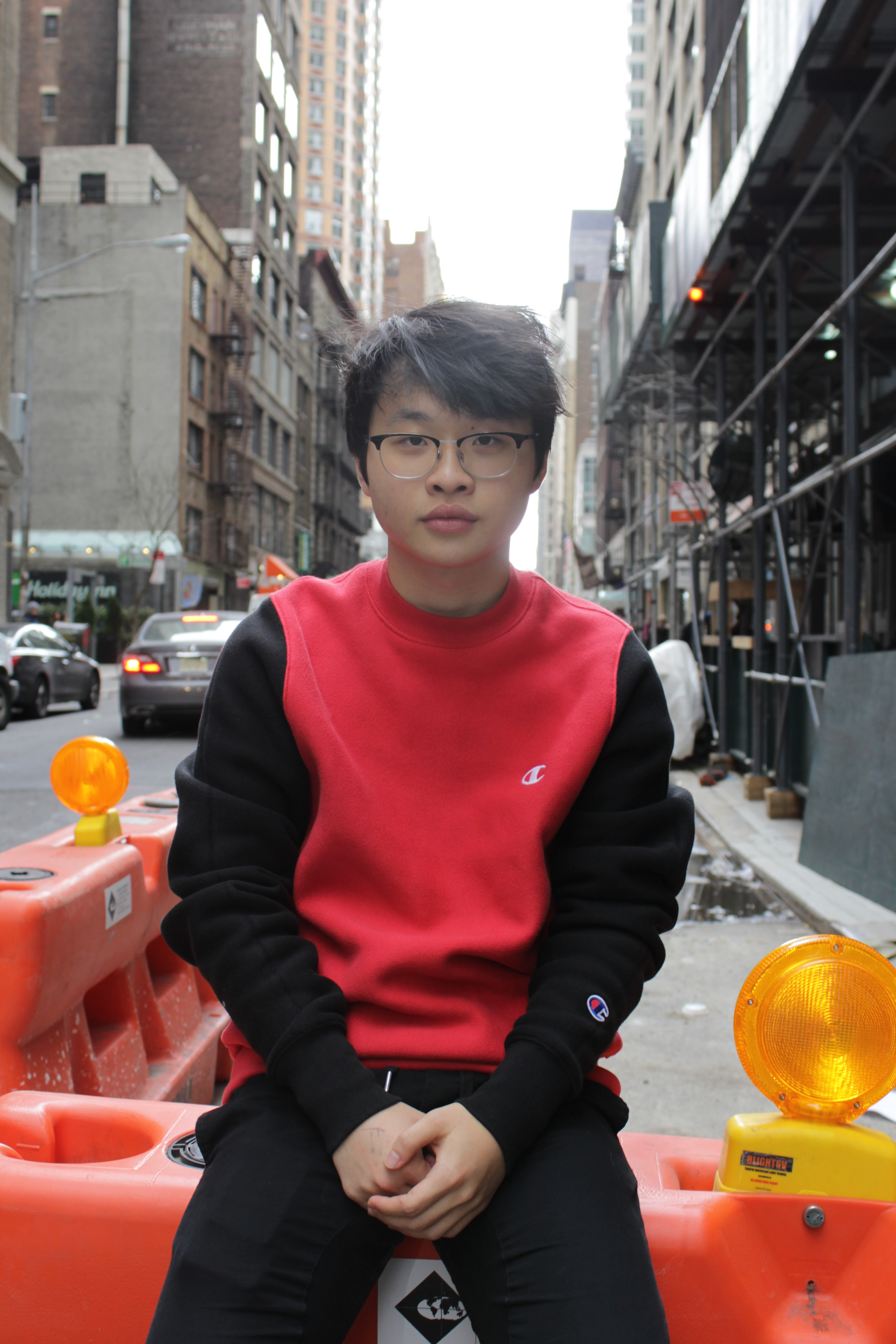
- Ridwan in 2018
- Born: May 27, 1999 (age 26); Bellevue, Washington, U.S.
- Education: Campbell Hall High School; Columbia University (attending)
- Occupation: Actor
- Years active: 2009–present

Kenny Ridwan (born May 27, 1999) is an American actor known for his roles in the TV series The Goldbergs, The Thundermans, and The McCarthys. He has also appeared as a guest star on Perception, Bones, Modern Family, and House of Lies.

== Early life ==
Ridwan was born in Bellevue, Washington, to a Chinese-American family. He is the third of five children.

Ridwan first took up acting at the age of six or seven, following an advertisement for an acting school. He has become passionate about performing arts taking part in school theater productions. As a fifth-grader, he portrayed Belle's father, Maurice, in its Beauty and the Beast production. Before pursuing the craft professionally and landing his first audition, he participated in acting classes for two and a half years.

Ridwan took advanced filmmaking in high school, and has shown interest in directing and producing. He graduated from Campbell Hall High School with honors.

Currently, Ridwan is enrolled at Columbia University for creative writing.

== Career ==
Ridwan portrayed the role of Dave Kim in ABC's sitcom The Goldbergs for ten seasons. He also starred as Gideon in Nickelodeon's series The Thundermans.

== Filmography ==
=== Film ===
Year	Title	Role	Notes
2012	Anita Ho	Toestah	
2012	Me First		Short film
2014	Meeting Gary	Troy	Short film
2015	Sins of the Father	Steve	
2024	The Thundermans Return	Gideon	
2024	Prom Dates	Greg	

=== Television ===
Year	Title	Role	Notes
2012	Animal Practice	Young Yamamoto	Episode: "Clean-Smelling Pirate"
2013	The Middle	Alan Hung	Episode: "Life Skills"
2013	Wendell & Vinnie	Jeffy	Episode: "Vinnie & Wendell"
2013	Deadtime Stories	Eugene Nazzaro	Episode: "The Beast of Baskerville"
2013	Piper's Picks TV	Himself	2 episodes
2013	Anger Management	Dr. Harris	Episode: "Charlie Kills His Ex's Sex Life"
2013	Modern Family	History Student	Episode "First Days"
2013	Bones	Brandon Heller	Episode: "The Mystery in the Meat"
2013	The Dumb Show	Kenny	TV movie
2014	Maker Shack Agency	Sweet Lu	Pilot
2014	Perception	Ely Dunham	Episode: "Curveball"
2014	Smart Alec	Chao	TV movie
2014	Divide & Conquer	Randy	TV movie
2014–2015	The McCarthys	Jared	Recurring role, 5 episodes
2014–2023	The Goldbergs	Dave Kim	Recurring role (seasons 1–9), guest (season 10), 98 episodes
2014–2018	The Thundermans	Gideon	Recurring role, 20 episodes
2015	House of Lies	Danny	Episode: "The Urge to Save Humanity is Almost Always a Front for the Urge to Rule"
2015–2016	Gortimer Gibbon's Life on Normal Street	Joshua Auerbach	Recurring role, 4 episodes
2019	Schooled	Dave Kim	Episode: "Hakuna Matata"
2025	The Thundermans: Undercover	Gideon	Episode: "The Summer I Turned Giddy"
