= Cooper Roth =

American actor (born 2000)

- Born: September 27, 2000 (age 25); Manhattan Beach, California, U.S.
- Years active: 2013–present
- Father: J.D. Roth

Cooper Jordan Roth (born September 27, 2000) is an American actor, known for his role as David in the ABC's situation comedy Back in the Game, and as voice of B-Dawg in Super Buddies.

== Early life and education ==
Roth was born on September 27, 2000, in Manhattan Beach, California. He has studied film and TV production at the USC School of Cinematic Arts.

== Acting career ==
Roth began his acting career at age 13, when he made his feature film debut in the superhero comedy film Super Buddies, where he played the voice role of B-Dawg, which was released on August 27, 2013. Roth made his television debut in the sitcom series Back in the Game, where he played the role of David Slingbaugh.

In 2014, Roth played the role of Patriot in the zombie comedy film Cooties directed by Jonathan Milott and Cary Murnion, premiered at the Sundance Film Festival on January 18, 2014, and released on September 18, 2015. On the same year, Roth appeared in the film The Road Within as Boy.

In 2015, Roth played the role of Pierce Brown in the television film Table 58 directed by Gil Junger. In 2018, Roth appeared in the crime drama anthology miniseries Unsolved, which he played the role of Dane Kading.

In 2023, Roth appeared on the fourth season of the comedy-drama series Never Have I Ever, in which he played the role of Shrimp.

== Filmography ==
Year	Film	Role	Notes
2013	Good Luck Charlie	Tommy Dixon	Episode: Futuredrama
2013	Super Buddies	B-Dawg	Voice
2013	Back in the Game	David Slingbaugh	—N/a
2014	The Goldbergs	J. C. Spink	2 episodes
2014	Cooties	Patriot	—N/a
2014	The Road Within	Boy	—N/a
2015	Table 58	Pierce Brown	—N/a
2015	True Detective	Aspen Conroy	2 episodes
2016	Kirby Buckets	Bucky	2 episodes
2017	The Middle	Gibson	Episode: "Ovary and Out"
2017	The Gifted	Scott	Episode: "eXodus"
2018	Unsolved	Dane Kading	4 episodes
2019	Oh Jerome, No	Teenage Dan	Episode: "Good Fella"
2019	Cake	Teenage Dan	Episode: "Bullies"
2023	Never Have I Ever	Shrimp	5 episodes
