= Rock Boat =

Annual rock festival on a cruise ship

- Genre: Indie rock, jam bands, pop music, Americana, bluegrass, country, folk, alternative rock
- Dates: Various
- Locations: Various; Norwegian Cruise Line; Carnival Cruise Lines
- Years active: 2001–present
- Website: rockboat.com

The Rock Boat is an annual rock music-themed music festival aboard a cruise ship. It badges itself "the world's greatest floating music festival". It takes place in different locations each cruise, with several dozen bands performing in each cruise.

== History and description ==
The Rock Boat concept was born in 2001 with a joint venture from Gainesville, Florida alternative rock band Sister Hazel and Atlanta, Georgia travel company Sixthman in a partial charter aboard the Carnival Jubilee. Sister Hazel was joined by the band Dexter Freebish and approximately 400 of their fans. The bands performed once on the ship, which sailed from Tampa, Florida to Cozumel, Mexico.

The concept has grown to become an annual event. Destinations have included locations such as Mexico, Nassau, Bahamas, Jamaica, and Turks and Caicos. The event is always hosted by Sister Hazel and includes musicians from all over the nation. Past performers include: Tonic, Red Wanting Blue, Carbon Leaf, Gaelic Storm, Collective Soul, Cowboy Mouth, Pat McGee Band, Zac Brown Band, Michael Tolcher, Vertical Horizon, David Ryan Harris, Ingram Hill, Better Than Ezra, Marc Broussard, Wideawake, Stephen Kellogg and the Sixers, NEEDTOBREATHE, Matt Nathanson, and many more. There are generally four or five performing stages constructed on the venue, and performances are scheduled from noon until 3 AM. However, many bands have been known to continue performing well beyond their scheduled set times and often collaborate on stage with other artists until dawn.

The cruise has been described by Ken Block (lead singer and guitarist for Sister Hazel) as "Spring Break for people with jobs", and with the memorable description "If you're on the outside looking in, it's hard to understand. If you're on the inside looking out, it's hard to explain."

== Event details ==
=== The Rock Boat XXVI ===
Ship: Norwegian Cruise Line Jewel
Sail Date: February 2, 2027
Ports: Leaving from Miami, Florida to Key West, Florida and Cozumel, Mexico
Performing Artists:

- The 502s
- A Brother's Fountain^{†}
- American Authors
- Barns Courtney
- Better Than Ezra
- Bombargo
- Brian Fechino & The Risky Beavers
- Brother Elsey
- Carrie Brockwell
- Graham Good & The Painters
- Hero The Band
- Jettee
- Kids in America
- Kristy Lee
- Kyndle Wylde^{†}
- Lovesweat
- Mother Road Sons
- Van Bellman
- Nicholas Petricca^{‡}
- The Paradox
- Raynes^{†}
- Red Wanting Blue
- Sister Hazel
- Stopgap Solution
- The Strumbellas
- Switchfoot
- Tobacco Road
- Walk The Moon

^{†} soundcheck artist winners
^{‡} billed as a "Special Performance"

=== The Rock Boat XXV ===
Ship: Norwegian Cruise Line Pearl
Sail Date: January 29, 2026 (for 7 days)
Ports: Leaving from Miami, Florida to Sint Maarten and San Juan, Puerto Rico
Performing Artists:

- Allen Mack Myers Moore*
- The Alternate Routes
- American Hi-Fi
- Amy Gerhartz
- The Band Feel
- Bowling For Soup
- Bradley Rhodes
- Brian Fechino & The Risky Beavers
- Carl Wockner
- Carbon Leaf
- DE'WAYNE
- Don't Panic
- Eric Hutchinson
- Fantastic Cat
- Garth.
- Graham Good & the Painters^{†}
- Hailey Steele^{§}
- John Tyler Wiley & His Virginia Choir
- Matt Nathanson
- Meaghan Farrell
- Megan Slankard
- Me(a)g(h)an^{‡}
- (the return of) Melodime
- Michael Haney
- Nathan Graham^{†}
- Nicotine Dolls
- NEEDTOBREATHE
- Parris Mitchell
- Red Wanting Blue
- RoseColoredWorld
- Sister Hazel
- Stephen Kellogg and The Twenty-Twenty Sixers
- The Struts
- Surfing for Daisy^{†}
- Switchfoot**
- The Trews*
- Welshly Arms
- Will Hoge

* stowaway artists
** replaced Judah & the Lion
^{†} soundcheck artist winners
^{‡} collaboration between the Meaghan Farrell and Megan Slankard
^{§} on board with Stephen Kellogg but did one solo show

Artists who were announced but withdrew for any reason:

- Judah & the Lion
- The Paradox

=== The Rock Boat XXIV ===
Ship: Norwegian Cruise Line Gem
Sail Date: January 26, 2025
Ports: Leaving from Miami, Florida to Harvest Caye, Belize and Roatán, Honduras
Performing Artists:

- American Authors
- Bermuda Search Party^{†}
- Brian Fechino & The Risky Beavers
- The Commonheart
- Don't Panic^{†}
- Echosmith
- Fantastic Cat
- Happy Landing
- The Indiana Drones^{†}
- Lady Bri
- Les Greene
- Meaghan Farrell
- Miles Nielsen & The Rusted Hearts
- Nicotine Dolls
- Red Wanting Blue
- Robert Jon & the Wreck
- Saxsquatch
- Sister Hazel
- The Strumbellas
- The Talbott Brothers*
- Todd Carey*
- Tonic
- Tyrone Wells
- Van Bellman
- The Verve Pipe
- Walk The Moon
- Welshly Arms
- Wild Adriatic
- Will Hoge
- Yam Haus

* stowaway artists
^{†} soundcheck artist winners

=== The Rock Boat XXIII ===
Ship: Norwegian Cruise Line Pearl
Sail Date: January 30, 2024
Ports: Leaving from Miami, Florida to Key West, Florida and Costa Maya, Mexico
(Original Destinations: Great Stirrup Cay, Bahamas and Costa Maya, Mexico)
Performing Artists:

- Allen Mack Myers Moore
- The Alternate Routes
- Bowling For Soup
- Brian Fechino
- Brother Maven^{†}
- The Commonheart
- DNA
- Drivin' n Cryin'
- Fever Dolls
- Gable Price and Friends
- Gaelic Storm
- Hotel Fiction
- Joe Bachman
- John Driskell Hopkins*
- Jon Foreman of Switchfoot
- J.R. Moore
- KT Tunstall
- Lit
- Me Like Bees^{†}
- Michael Tolcher
- The Moon City Masters
- The New Respects
- Patty Pershayla & The Mayhaps^{†}
- Red Wanting Blue
- Sister Hazel
- The Struts
- Susto
- Thomas Nicholas*
- Young the Giant

* stowaway artists
^{†} soundcheck artist winners

=== The Rock Boat XXII ===
Ship: Norwegian Cruise Line Pearl
Sail Date: January 23, 2023
Ports: Leaving from Miami, Florida to Puerto Plata, Dominican Republic and Nassau, Bahamas
Performing Artists:

- American Authors
- The Astronomers^{†}
- The Beaches
- Brian Fechino
- Carbon Leaf
- Dan Rodriguez*
- Driveway
- Floorbird^{†}
- Green Light Morning^{†}
- The Heavy Hours
- Hero The Band
- Kristy Lee
- Lady Bri
- Lit
- Magic Giant
- Meaghan Farrell*
- Megan Slankard
- Mo Lowda & The Humble
- Mom Rock
- Needtobreathe
- Neon Trees
- Red Wanting Blue
- Sister Hazel
- Southern Avenue
- Van Bellman
- The Talbott Brothers
- Terminus Horns (floating artist)
- Trousdale
- Welshly Arms
- Yam Haus
- Zach Person

* stowaway artists
^{†} soundcheck artist winners

=== The Rock Boat XXI ===
Ship: Norwegian Cruise Line Gem
Sail Date: November 7, 2021
Ports: Leaving from Miami, Florida to Great Stirrup Cay, Bahamas and Ocho Rios, Jamaica
(Original sailing was postponed due to Covid-19)
(Original Sail Date: January 27, 2021)
(Original Destinations: Ocho Rios, Jamaica and Georgetown, Grand Cayman)
Performing Artists:

- The Alternate Routes
- American Authors
- Andrew Leahey & The Homestead
- Andrew McMahon In The Wilderness
- Animal Years
- Billy Pilgrim
- The Blue Stones
- Bowling For Soup
- Brian Fechino
- The Collection
- Dark Water
- Elevado *
- Jon Tyler Wiley & His Virginia Choir *
- Joshua & the Holy Rollers
- Kristian Bush
- Mayday Parade
- Meaghan Farrell
- Micky James
- Mom Rock
- The New Respects
- Nick Fradiani
- Night Without Cars
- Phillip-Michael Scales^{†}
- Red Wanting Blue
- Sister Hazel
- Swimming With Bears
- Switchfoot
- The Trews
- Vertical Horizon
- Wildermiss^{†}
- Will Hoge

Artists who were announced but withdrew for any reason:

- Caroline Rose
- Hero The Band
- Lady Bri
- The Last Internationale
- The National Parks^{†}
- Southern Avenue
- Welshly Arms
- We The Kings
- Yam Haus

* stowaway artists
^{†} soundcheck artist winners

=== The Rock Boat XX ===
Ship: Norwegian Cruise Line Pearl
Sail Date: January 24, 2020
Ports: Leaving from Miami, Florida to Harvest Caye, Belize and Roatán, Honduras
Performing Artists:

- Allen Mack Myers Moore
- The Alternate Routes
- Amy Gerhartz
- Animal Years
- The Bones of J.R. Jones
- Brett Newski & The No Tomorrow
- The Brevet
- Brian Fechino
- Carbon Leaf
- Carly Burruss
- Emily Wolfe
- Gaelic Storm
- Hero The Band
- J.R. Moore
- Lawrence
- Meaghan Farrell ^{‡}
- Melodime
- Motherfolk^{$}
- Needtobreathe
- Red Wanting Blue
- Sammy Rae & The Friends
- SCR
- Sister Hazel
- Stephen Kellogg*
- Switchfoot
- Tall Heights
- Tonic
- Tony Lucca
- The Unlikely Candidates^{$}
- Welshly Arms
- The Whiskey Treaty Roadshow^{$}
- Wideawake featuring The Kin^{†}
- Will Hoge*

* stowaway artists
^{†} The Kin departed early due to family bereavement
^{‡} on board with Amy Gerhartz but did one solo show
^{$} soundcheck artist winners

=== The Rock Boat XIX ===
Ship: Norwegian Cruise Line Pearl
Sail Date: February 1, 2019
Ports: Leaving from Tampa, Florida to Key West and Nassau, Bahamas
Performing Artists:

- Alan Doyle
- Andrew Leahey & The Homestead^{‡}
- Andrew McMahon In The Wilderness
- Andy Frasco & The U.N.
- Andy Suzuki & The Method
- Aslyn
- Atlas Genius
- Brian Fechino
- Bronze Radio Return
- Chris Ferrara & The Common Good
- Dan Rodriguez
- David Ryan Harris
- Hannah Wicklund & The Steppin Stones
- Harpoonist & The Axe Murderer
- Ian Moore
- Katie Pruitt
- Kevin Devine
- Magic Giant
- Matt Nathanson
- The New Respects
- Plain White T's
- Red Wanting Blue
- Sarah Potenza
- Simplified
- Sister Hazel
- SCR^{‡}
- The Talbott Brothers^{‡}
- Tim Warren and Eric Donnelly*
- Trae Pierce And The T-stones
- Wild Adriatic
- Young Rising Sons^{†}

* stowaway artists
^{†} dropped out due to illness
^{‡} soundcheck artist winners

=== The Rock Boat XVIII ===
Ship: Norwegian Cruise Line Pearl
Sail Date: January 30, 2018
Ports: Leaving from New Orleans, Louisiana to Progreso, Mexico and Cozumel, Mexico
Performing Artists:

- Alan Doyle
- The Alternate Routes
- Andy Frasco & The U.N.
- Barenaked Ladies
- Brian Fechino
- Choir! Choir! Choir!
- Christian Lopez
- Colony House
- Cowboy Mouth
- Danny Michel
- Dan Rodriguez^{†}
- The Dead South
- Drew Holcomb and The Neighbors
- Elliott Brood
- The Georgia Flood
- JD Eicher*
- Kick The Robot
- Larkin Poe
- Low Cut Connie
- Melodime
- Needtobreathe
- The New Respects
- Noah Guthrie
- Oak & Ash^{†}
- The Rocketboys
- Sam Burchfield
- Sarah Potenza
- Sister Hazel
- Stop Light Observations
- Tony Lucca*
- Waterdog
- Welshly Arms
- Wild Adriatic
- Will Hoge
- Wylder^{†}

* stowaway artists
^{†} soundcheck artist winners

=== The Rock Boat XVII ===
Ship: Norwegian Cruise Line Jade
Sail Date: February 10, 2017
Ports: Leaving from Tampa, Florida to Harvest Caye, Belize and Costa Maya, Mexico
Performing Artists:

- All About A Bubble^{$}
- Aijia*
- Amy Gerhartz
- Andy Grammer*
- Andy Frasco & The U.N.
- Andy Suzuki & The Method
- Ben Rector
- Better Than Ezra
- Brian Fechino
- Caleb Hawley^{$}
- Carbon Leaf
- Connor Pledger
- The Currys^{$}
- Dexter Freebish
- Firekid
- Francisco Vidal
- Gaelic Storm
- Green River Ordinance
- Grizfolk
- Harrow Fair
- Jared & The Mill
- JD Eicher
- Knox Hamilton
- Lovesweat
- Matt Nathanson^{‡}
- Melodime
- Parachute
- Paul Pfau
- Red Wanting Blue
- Ripe
- Sarah Williams^{†}
- Sasha Aaron
- Sister Hazel
- Stephen Kellogg & The South West North East
- Steve Everett
- The Trews
- Walk Off the Earth**
- Welshly Arms
- Wild Adriatic
- WRENN (AKA Pip The Pansy)

* married couple, dropped out due to pregnancy
** replaced Andy Grammer - but also dropped out due to pregnancy
^{†} on board with Amy Gerhartz but did one solo show
^{‡} last minute replacement for Walk off the Earth
^{$} soundcheck artist winners

=== The Rock Boat XVI ===
Ship: Norwegian Cruise Line Pearl
Sail Date: January 26, 2016
Ports: Leaving from Miami, Florida to Costa Maya, Mexico and Grand Cayman
Performing Artists:

- Air Traffic Controller^{†}
- The Alternate Routes
- Andy Suzuki & The Method
- The Brevet^{†}
- Brian Fechino
- Bronze Radio Return
- Colony House
- The Dusty 45s
- Emerson Hart
- Gavin DeGraw
- Hey Monea!
- Humming House
- JD Eicher & The Goodnights
- Kristy Lee & Dirt Road Revival
- Melodime
- Michael Franti & Spearhead
- Mike Mains & The Branches
- Needtobreathe
- Pat McGee
- Paul McDonald
- Radio Birds
- Red Wanting Blue
- The Rocketboys
- Sister Hazel
- Steve Everett
- The Trews
- Welshly Arms^{†}
- Wild Adriatic
- Will Hoge

^{†} soundcheck artist winners

=== The Rock Boat XV ===
Ship: Norwegian Cruise Line Pearl
Sail Date: January 24, 2015
Ports: Leaving from Miami, Florida to Cozumel, Mexico
Performing Artists:

- Amy Gerhartz
- Andy Suzuki & The Method^{†}
- Barenaked Ladies
- Brian Collins
- Brian Fechino
- Broken Anchor^{†}
- Carbon Leaf
- Chuck Cannon
- Gaelic Storm
- Gareth Asher & The Earthlings^{†}
- Green River Ordinance
- Hey Monea!
- Honor By August
- Kris Allen
- Melodime
- Michael Franti & Spearhead
- The Mowgli's
- Paul Pfau^{†}
- Radio Birds
- Red Wanting Blue
- The Roosevelts
- Scars on 45
- The Shadowboxers
- Simplified
- Sister Hazel
- Steve Everett^{†}
- Stokeswood
- Trailer Park Ninjas
- Vintage Blue^{†}
- Von Grey
- Will Hoge

^{†}soundcheck artist winners

=== The Rock Boat XIV ===
Ship: Norwegian Cruise Line Pearl
Sail Date: February 22, 2014
Ports: Leaving from Miami, Florida to Great Stirrup Cay, Bahamas
Performing Artists:

- Alternate Routes
- Amy Gerhartz
- Besides Daniel
- Bronze Radio Return
- Collective Soul
- Courrier
- The Dunwells
- Ed Kowalczyk formerly of Live
- Ed Roland & The Sweet Tea Project
- Edwin McCain
- Erick Baker
- Gaelic Storm
- The Gallery
- JD Eicher
- Honor By August
- Mark Kroos^{†}
- Melodime
- Michael Bernard Fitzgerald
- The Mowgli's
- Native Run
- Radio Birds
- Radiolucent
- Reel Big Fish
- Red Wanting Blue
- The Roosevelts
- Scars on 45
- Scott Munns
- Sister Hazel
- Stephen Kellogg
- Taylor Carson
- Tonic
- Will Hoge
- Will Turpin

^{†} not officially in the lineup but did one solo show

=== The Rock Boat XIII ===
Ship: Norwegian Cruise Line Pearl
Sail Date: February 24, 2013
Ports: Leaving from Miami, Florida to Great Stirrup Cay, Bahamas
Performing Artists:

- A Rocket to the Moon
- Alternate Routes
- Amy Gerhartz
- Ben Rector
- Brandi Carlile
- Brendan James
- Bronze Radio Return
- Carbon Leaf
- The Daylights
- Drew Holcomb and the Neighbors
- The Dunwells
- Good Old War
- Green River Ordinance
- Ingram Hill
- Joe Bachman
- Jon McLaughlin
- Jukebox The Ghost
- Junior Doctor
- Matthew Mayfield
- Native Run
- NEEDTOBREATHE
- Ponderosa
- Red Wanting Blue
- Roger Clyne and the Peacemakers
- Rusted Root
- Saints of Valory
- Satellites & Sirens
- Scars on 45
- Sister Hazel
- Stokeswood
- Swear and Shake
- Tony Lucca
- Trevor Jackson
- Will Hoge
- Yacht Rock Revue

=== The Rock Boat XII ===
Ship: Carnival Elation
Sail Date: March 1, 2012
Ports: Leaving from New Orleans, Louisiana to Cozumel, Mexico
Performing Artists:

- Alpha Rev
- Alternate Routes
- Atomic Tom
- Blackberry Smoke
- Brian Jarvis
- Bronze Radio Return
- Carbon Leaf
- Chamberlin
- The Damnwells
- Drew Holcomb and the Neighbors
- Dugas
- Ella Riot
- Freddy Jones Band
- Hey Monea!
- Hornit
- Jerad Finck
- Kristy Lee
- Ingram Hill
- Kenny Mehler
- Marc Broussard
- Michael Tolcher
- Red Wanting Blue
- Simplified
- Sister Hazel
- Stephen Kellogg and the Sixers
- Sunset Love Affair
- Thorny Rose
- Tim Brantley
- Tony Lucca
- Trailer Park Ninjas
- Vertical Horizon
- Will Hoge

=== The Rock Boat XI ===
Ship: Carnival Inspiration
Sail Date: January 6, 2011
Ports: Leaving from Tampa, Florida to Costa Maya, Mexico (port unknown prior to sailing)
Performing Artists:

- Alternate Routes
- Antigone Rising
- Aslyn
- Death on Two Wheels
- Ed Kowalczyk
- Elmwood
- Gaelic Storm
- Graham Colton
- Green River Ordinance
- Ingram Hill
- Junior Doctor
- Matt Duke
- Matt Hires
- Matt Wertz
- M.E.R.M.E.R.
- Nada Surf
- NEEDTOBREATHE
- Ponderosa
- Sam Thacker
- Scott Munns
- Sister Hazel
- Tim Brantley
- Toby Lightman
- Tony Lucca
- Trailer Park Ninjas
- Truth & Salvage Co.
- Will Hoge

=== The Rock Boat X ===
Ship: Carnival Inspiration
Sail Date: January 7, 2010
Ports: Leaving from Tampa, Florida to Cozumel, Mexico
Performing Artists:

- Andrew Hoover
- Augustana
- B-Liminal
- Blackberry Smoke
- The Bridges
- Carbon Leaf
- Chelsea Williams
- Dexter Freebish
- Evan McHugh
- Francisco Vidal
- Gaelic Storm
- Green River Ordinance
- Jim Bianco
- Marc Broussard
- Michael Tolcher
- Oval Opus
- Pat McGee
- Sister Hazel
- Scott Munns
- Stephen Kellogg and the Sixers
- Sun Domingo
- Tony Lucca
- Tyrone Wells
- Wideawake
- Will Hoge

=== The Rock Boat IX ===
Ship: Carnival Destiny
Sail Date: January 17, 2009
Ports: Leaving from Miami, Florida to Nassau, Bahamas and Half Moon Cay
Performing Artists:

- Alternate Routes
- Aslyn
- Aural Pleasure
- The Benjy Davis Project
- Blackberry Smoke
- Carbon Leaf
- Cowboy Mouth
- Curtis Peoples
- David Ryan Harris
- Emerson Hart
- Ernie Halter
- Francisco Vidal
- Gaelic Storm
- Garrison Starr
- Graham Colton
- Green River Ordinance
- Hanson
- The Kin
- Michael Tolcher
- Sam Thacker
- Scott Munns
- Sister Hazel
- The Spring Standards
- Stephen Kellogg and the Sixers
- Tonic
- Trevor Hall
- Tyrone Wells
- Wideawake
- Zac Brown Band

=== The Rock Boat VIII ===
Ship: Carnival Imagination
Sail Date: January 19, 2008
Ports: Leaving from Miami, Florida to Ocho Rios, Jamaica and Georgetown, Grand Cayman
Performing Artists:

- Alternate Routes
- Amy Gerhartz *
- Andy Davis
- Aslyn
- Bain Mattox
- Brett Dennen
- David Ryan Harris
- The Dewayn Brothers *
- The Edison Project
- Emerson Hart
- Gareth Asher *
- Gary Pfaff (now Gary Ray Pfaff)
- [Georgia (band)|Georgia] *
- Glen Phillips
- Josh Kelley
- Jon McLaughlin
- Kate Voegele
- Keaton Simons
- Keith Kane
- Marc Broussard
- Matt Nathanson
- Oakhurst
- Pat McGee Band
- Scarlet Kings (AKA Oval Opus)
- Sister Hazel
- Stephen Kellogg and the Sixers
- Sons of William
- Stroke 9
- Toad The Wet Sprocket
- Yo Mama's Big Fat Booty Band
- Zac Brown Band

* Un-announced artists who played at least one show

=== The Rock Boat VII ===
Ship: Carnival Legend
Sail Date: January 11, 2007
Ports: Leaving from Fort Lauderdale, Florida to Grand Turk, Turks and Caicos
Performing Artists:

- Alan Yates
- Alex Woodard
- Aslyn
- Better Than Ezra
- Carbon Leaf
- Christopher Jak
- Claire Wyndham
- The Clarks
- Collective Soul
- Cowboy Mouth
- David Ryan Harris
- Dead Confederate
- Drew Copeland
- Ed Roland
- Emerson Hart
- Five Star Iris
- Florez
- Francisco Vidal
- Fred LeBlanc
- Gaelic Storm
- Getaway Car
- Greg Joseph
- Heather Luttrell
- Honor By August
- Ingram Hill
- John Thomas Griffith
- Josh Kelley
- Keith Kane
- Ken Block
- Oval Opus
- Pat McGee Band
- Paul Sanchez
- Sam Thacker
- Scott Blasey
- Scott Munns
- Sister Hazel
- Sons of William
- Sonya Tetlow
- Stef Dorfman
- Toby Lightman
- Wideawake
- Zac Brown Band

=== The Rock Boat VI ===
Ship: Carnival Elation
Sail Date: January 14, 2006
Ports: Leaving from Galveston, Texas to Playa del Carmen and Progresso, Mexico

- Originally scheduled to leave from the Port of New Orleans

Performing Artists:

- Adam Richman
- Ari Hest
- Aslyn
- Better Than Ezra
- Blue Merle
- Carbon Leaf
- Danielia Cotton
- Dave Barnes
- David Ryan Harris
- Dexter Freebish
- Django Walker
- Drew Copeland
- Evenout
- Five Star Iris
- Florez
- Francisco Vidal
- Fred LeBlanc
- Gaelic Storm
- Getaway Car
- Glen Phillips
- Jackson Rohm
- Jon Hopkins
- Josh Kelley
- Ken Block
- Marc Broussard
- Martin Sexton
- Mat Kearney
- Matt Wertz
- Michael Tolcher
- Pat Green
- Pat McGee Band
- Scott Munns
- Shawn Allen
- Shawn Mullins
- Sister Hazel
- Stef Dorfman
- Sovus Radio
- Virginia Coalition
- Wideawake
- Zac Brown Band

=== The Rock Boat V ===
Canceled due to Hurricane Katrina*
Ship: Carnival Sensation
Scheduled Performers:

- Alex Woodard
- Ari Hest
- The Clarks
- John Corbitt
- Cowboy Mouth
- Dave Barnes
- David Ryan Harris
- Dexter Freebish
- Doug Ray
- Emerson Hart
- Gaelic Storm
- Gavin DeGraw
- Ingram Hill
- Marc Broussard
- Matt Nathanson
- Matt Wertz
- Michael Tolcher
- O.A.R.
- Sara Bareilles
- Sister Hazel
- Stroke 9
- Theresa Andersson
- Toby Lightman
- Wideawake
- Will Hoge

* Guests and artists were invited to Atlanta during the weekend they were supposed to be on the cruise. Around 500 guests and most of the scheduled bands attended the shows, dubbed "Rock For Relief", raising $55,000 for Hurricane Katrina Relief.

=== The Rock Boat IV ===
Ship: Carnival Imagination
Sail Date: October 7, 2004
Ports: Leaving from Miami, Florida to Cozumel, Mexico
Performing Artists:

- Chuck Carrier
- The Clarks
- Cowboy Mouth
- Dave Barnes
- Dexter Freebish
- Emerson Hart
- Evenout
- Francisco Vidal
- Free Sol
- Gaelic Storm
- Gavin DeGraw
- Hello Dave
- Ingram Hill
- Jackson Rohm
- Ken Block
- Marc Broussard
- Michael Tolcher
- New Monsoon
- Pat McGee Band
- Peter Searcy
- Pomeroy
- Sam Thacker
- Scott Munns
- Shawn Mullins
- Sister Hazel
- Stephen Kellogg
- Tonic
- Virginia Coalition
- Wes Hutchinson
- Will Hoge
- Zac Brown Band

=== The Rock Boat III ===
Ship: Carnival Sensation
Sail Date: August 28, 2003
Ports: Leaving from Tampa, Florida to Cozumel, Mexico
Performing Artists:

- Alan Yates
- Alex Woodard
- Angela Todd
- Angie Aparo
- Bain Mattox
- Brian Vander Ark
- Cary Pierce
- Chuck Carrier
- Courtney Jaye
- Cowboy Mouth
- Dave Matthews Cover Band
- David Ryan Harris
- Dexter Freebish
- Edwin McCain
- Fighting Gravity
- Francisco Vidal
- Fred LeBlanc
- Ingram Hill
- Jackson Rohm
- John Thomas Griffith
- Ken Block
- Michael Tolcher
- Mieka Pauley
- Pat McGee Band
- Pete Schmidt
- The Rising
- Scott Munns
- Shawn Allen
- Sister Hazel
- Soul Phood
- Stephen Kellogg
- Tia Sillers & Mark Selby
- Teitur
- Todd Martin
- Tonic
- Virginia Coalition
- Wes Dearth

=== The Rock Boat II ===
Ship: Carnival Sensation
Sail Date: August 29, 2002
Ports: Leaving from Tampa, Florida to Key West, Florida and Nassau, Bahamas
Performing Artists:

- Bain Mattox
- Cary Pierce
- Chuck Carrier
- Cowboy Mouth
- Courtney Jaye
- Chrystina Lloree
- David Ryan Harris
- Dexter Freebish
- Edwin McCain
- Francisco Vidal
- Marathon
- Mimi Holland
- Pat McGee Band
- Quick Shot Paulo
- The Rugs
- Sister Hazel
- Six Against Seven
- Alex Woodard

=== The Rock Boat I (officially called Rock 'N Roll At Sea) ===
Ship: Carnival Jubilee
Sail Date: August 30, 2001
Ports: Leaving from Tampa, Florida to Key West, Florida and Cozumel, Mexico
Performing Artists:

- Dexter Freebish
- Sister Hazel
