= Andy Suzuki & The Method =

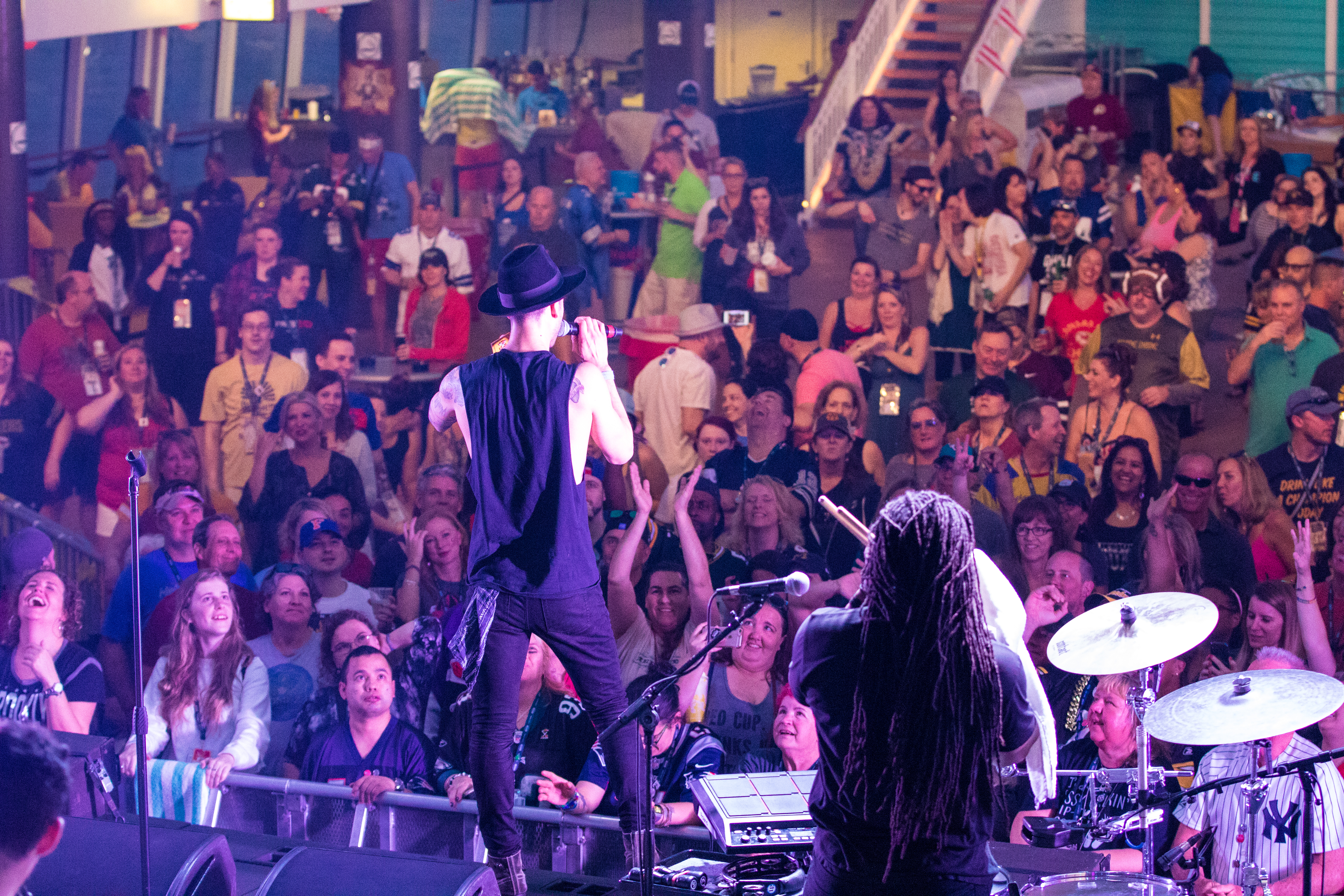
- Andy Suzuki & The Method performing in front of The Rock Boat XIX crowd.

Background information
- Origin: New York City, New York, US
- Years active: 2008–present
- Members: Andy Suzuki; Tebukozza Babumba
- Website: www.andysuzukimusic.com

Andy Suzuki & The Method is a rock band based in New York City led by Andy Suzuki and his songwriting partner Kozza Babumba, grandson of Grammy Award winning Nigerian drummer Babatunde Olatunji. The band formed in 2006 at Brown University, where Andy met Kozza.

The band has toured in support of Ringo Starr, Eric Hutchinson, Joshua Radin, Delta Rae, Sister Hazel, Marc Broussard, Tyrone Wells, and Bernhoft, among others. They have also showcased at numerous festivals, including SXSW, The Rock Boat, CMJ, and Voodoo Fest.

Since releasing their most recent album, Alibi, in January 2019, ASTM has played The Rock Boat, been featured by Live Nation's Ones to Watch blog, appeared on Tidal's coveted Tidal Rising playlist and SoundCloud's Fresh Pressed playlist, and showcased at The Smithsonian APAC's Inaugural Gala and at a Barclays Center Summer Session, in addition to headlining - and selling out - several shows across the country.

== History ==
The band released its first EP, 300 Pianos, in 2009. In 2011, they were selected as the Manhattan winner for WNYC's annual Battle Of The Boroughs. In the same year, the band garnered some positive internet attention with their cover of Kanye West's "All of the Lights," reaching more than 100,000 views on YouTube. The release of the band's second EP, The Ghost Stories EP, followed in February 2012. Andy Suzuki & The Method released videos for “Her Ghost” and “Take Care Of Me” in support of "The Ghost Stories EP" in 2012, and following the EP's release the band received an Official Artist Showcase as part of the SXSW Music Festival. The Urban Daily included the band in their “25 Artists That Need To Be Heard” series.

In the fall of 2012, ASTM toured Brunei with a sponsorship from KFC and UBD FM, establishing a strong regional following among Bruneian youth. During this tour, fans of the band in Brunei adopted the monikers "Methodons" and "Methodonnas".

In May 2013 the band released the full-length Born Out Of Mischief album, with the album's first single "Keep Me Running" premiering on Billboard.com a week before the album's release.

In 2015 the band participated in a TEDx conference hosted by the Central Intelligence Agency at their headquarters in Langley, Virginia. Two years later, they showcased at TEDxMidatlantic in Washington, D.C.

2017 was a banner year for the band with their release of The Glass Hour. It garnered praise from the music community, both critically and commercially, including a Billboard.com premiere of the song Overtime. Impose magazine called The Glass Hour "a fantastic pop album from a group deserving of more recognition.", while online independent music blog Indientry hailed the album as "a blend of indie pop, rock, R&B and folk – sounds too complicated, but it comes together in a surprisingly simplistic, buoyant album." The band also released two singles - covers of "Say You Won't Let Go" by James Arthur, and "Fast Car" by Tracy Chapman.

In 2018, along with touring across the East Coast and working on the upcoming album Alibi, the band was featured on a NYC Lottery commercial.

Alibi was released in mid-January 2019. The album's opening track, "Medicine", was among the most well received. Live Nation's Ones To Watch blog described "Medicine" as a “blues-rock anthem with pop sensibilities”. The music video for Medicine was subsequently released across all platforms, including the band's first VEVO feature, and was included in Tidal's Tidal Rising playlist.

== Discography ==
=== Studio albums ===
- Born Out Of Mischief (2013)
- The Glass Hour (2017)
- Alibi (2019)

=== EPs ===
- 300 Pianos (2009)
- The Ghost Stories EP (2012)

=== Singles ===
- "Over the Water" (2015)
- "Forgiven" (2015)
- "My Oh My" (2015)
- "Overtime" (2016)
- "I Need You More (The More You Leave)" (2017)
- "I Can't Live" (2017)
- "Shelter" (2017)
- "Fast Car" (2017)
- "Say You Won't Let Go" (2017)
