= Honor By August =

Honor By August (who capitalize the "By" in their name) is an American rock band originally from Washington, D.C. They come from the same scene around Georgetown University that spawned Vertical Horizon, although many years later.

The idea behind the name "Honor By August" is that one gains honor by doing something admirable or awe-inspiring (as an adjective, "august" means "inspiring reverence or admiration").

Early on, the group won the grand prize in the pop category of Billboard Magazine's World Song Contest for a live recording of the song "Only in Photographs." Their first big break was opening for Hanson at the 9:30 Club as a result of winning a "battle of the bands" contest. They also won a competition, out of over 150 bands, to open for Bon Jovi at a sold-out show at the DC-area arena Verizon Center. Additionally, the group has played or toured with Imagine Dragons, Switchfoot, Jonny Lang, Tony Lucca, Hanson, Red Wanting Blue, Hootie & the Blowfish, Pat McGee Band, Howie Day, Ingram Hill, Emerson Hart, Keith Kane (of Vertical Horizon), Virginia Coalition, Emmet Swimming, Aslyn, Michael Tolcher, State Radio, Stephen Kellogg and the Sixers, and The Alternate Routes. They won the BMI/Pulse Battle of the Boat competition to play on The Rock Boat in 2007 and were again added to the lineup for 2014.

Their first independent effort, Drowning Out the Television, was released in 2006, then re-released in 2007 with bonus material. It was produced by Ted Comerford. Both the original release and the re-release were made available on Aware Records's website and hit #1 in sales.

In 2010, the group self-released an EP entitled On Our Own and embarked on a national tour with Luna Halo and the Ruse.

The group's 2013 release Monuments to Progress, its first on Noble Steed Music, was funded by a Kickstarter drive. According to frontman Michael Pearsall, "We had all the material but not the funds, so figured we’d try Kickstarter. The amount of support we received was completely humbling and mind-blowing; not only did we make enough to record the album, but the donations actually surpassed what we needed."

The album was released on April 23, 2013, and the first single, "Last Chance," was picked up nationally and added into rotation on over a dozen stations, including WIAD (94.7 Fresh FM) and "The Pulse" on Sirius XM.

== Members ==
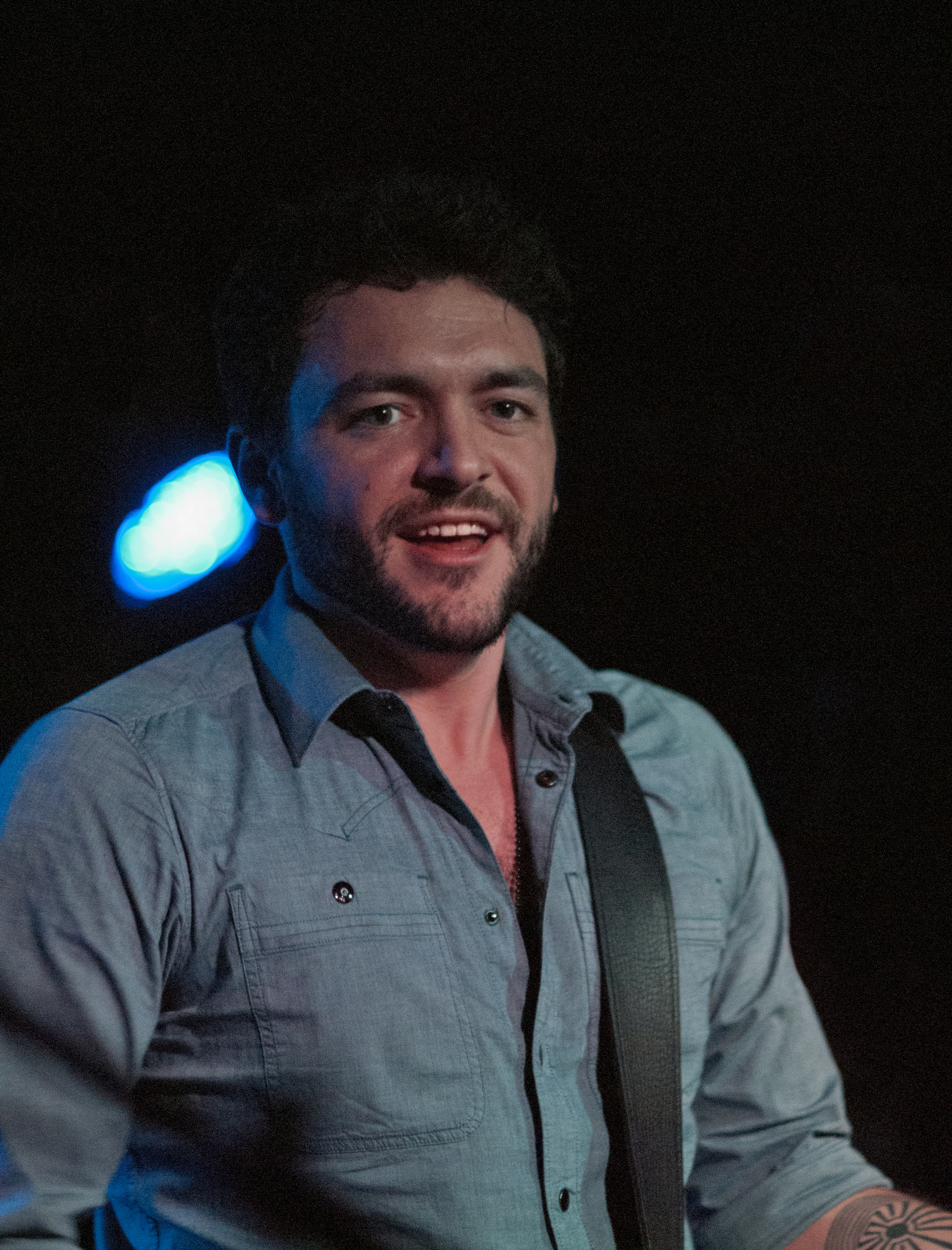
Michael Pearsall, the band's frontman.

Current members

- Michael Pearsall - vocals, guitar
- Evan Field - guitars, vocals, piano
- Brian Shanley - drums, percussion
- Chris Rafetto - bass, vocals, piano

Former members

- John Athayde - bass, keyboards, vocals (2006 - 2008)
- Joe Wenger - bass ( - 2006)
- Edgar Fleming - drums (2005)

== Discography ==
- Overlooking Virginia (2004, acoustic. As MP2 [Michael Pearsall Project])
- Photographs EP (2005, digital-only release)
- Drowning Out the Television (2006. 2007, re-released with bonus tracks)
- Found (2009)
- On Our Own EP (2010)
- Monuments to Progress (Noble Steed Music, 2013)
- Four Sides EP (2015)
