= Mattox =

Mattox is a surname. Notable people with the surname include:

- Bain Mattox, American musician
- Bernadette Mattox, American basketball coach
- Cloy Mattox (1902–1985), American baseball player
- Jim Mattox (1943–2008), American lawyer and politician
- Jim Mattox (baseball) (1896–1973), American baseball player
- Jon Mattox, American composer
- Kenneth Mattox (born c. 1938), American surgeon
- Martha Mattox (1879–1933), American actress
- Marv Mattox, American football player
- Matt Mattox (1922–2013), American jazz and ballet dancer
- Ray Mattox (1927–2005), American politician

== See also ==
- Mattox Bastion, mountain of Antarctica
- Mattox Creek, river in Virginia, United States
