= The Spring Standards =

American folk-rock band

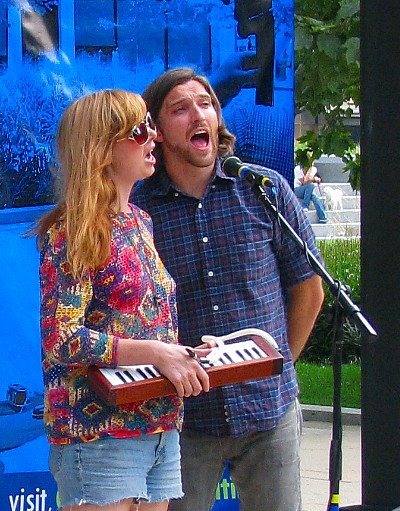
- The Spring Standards at Center Plaza, Baltimore, Maryland, August 2011

Background information
- Origin: New York City
- Genres: Folk-Rock
- Years active: 2008–present
- Members: James Cleare; Heather Robb; James Smith
- Website: https://www.thespringstandards.net/

The Spring Standards is a three-piece folk-rock band based in New York City.

== Biography ==
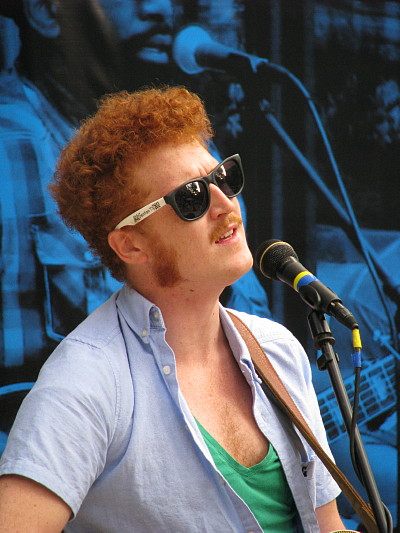
The Spring Standards concert at Center Plaza, Baltimore, Maryland, August 2011

James Cleare, Heather Robb, and James Smith first sang together in the last summer of the 20th century. Having just turned 16, the three teens with a common affinity for "oldies" music and harmony spent the next two years performing in the Delaware/Pennsylvania area.

Influenced as much by their parent's record collections as they were by what they heard on the radio, their style began to form. The group dissolved after they graduated.

Cleare, Robb, and, Smith are all songwriters and multi-instrumentalists. They create a sound that listeners might expect from a band twice their size.

Before they were The Spring Standards, all three members were in Old Springs Pike along with John Gallagher Jr. The three current members played together in an earlier band called The Urban Wombats.

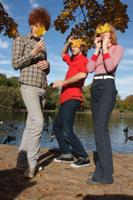

== Members ==
The band members are:

- James Cleare - vocals, acoustic, bass, and electric guitars, harmonica, drums, and percussion
- Heather Robb - vocals, melodica, keyboard, glockenspiel, drums, accordion, and percussion
- James Smith - vocals, acoustic, bass and electric guitars, trumpet, drums, and percussion

== Recordings ==
The Spring Standards released their first EP No One Will Know in July 2008 which was co-produced by Rhett Miller of Old 97s and engineered by Kieran Kelly of The Buddy Project. The self-released EP found mild success in the Northeast, leading to an appearance on Late Night with Conan O'Brien. On April 13, 2010, they self-released their first full-length album Would Things Be Different produced by Bryce Goggin (Pavement, Phish, The Apples in Stereo).

They returned to the studio in early 2011 to record a double EP entitled yellow//gold, released on May 1, 2012. The record was produced by Dan Molad.

On December 26, 2012, they recorded audio and video at their fifth annual Boxing Day concert at the Arden Club Gild Hall, Arden, Delaware. The project was funded by a Kickstarter campaign. The album Live from Delaware was released on May 21, 2013.

== Discography ==
No One Will Know EP (Released July 29, 2008)

1. Goodbye Midnight
2. In The Underground
3. Little Bug
4. Reply
5. Breath And Sound
6. Your Lie
7. Sad Song
8. Pin Cushion (Bonus Track)

Would Things be Different (Released April 13, 2010)

1. Skyline
2. Here I Am
3. Queen Of The Lot
4. Halcyon Days
5. Bells And Whistles
6. Not Again
7. Frozen
8. Trouble
9. Sharks
10. The Hush
11. Unravel Unwin
12. Drowning In Sobriety (Bonus Track)

yellow/gold Double EP (Released May 1, 2012)

1. Only Skin
2. Heavy Home
3. Chicago
4. Crushing Pennies
5. Enemies
6. Wildfire Forest
7. So Simple So True
8. Nightmare
9. Watch The Moon Disappear
10. Rusty Wheels
11. Here We Go
12. Unmarked Pill

Live from Delaware (Released May 21, 2013)

1. Wildfire Forest
2. Queen of the Lot
3. Nightmare
4. Rusty Wheels
5. The Hush
6. Only Skin
7. Bells and Whistles
8. Chicago
9. Sharks
10. Premonition
11. Here We Go
12. Unravel Unwind
13. Watch the Moon Disappear
14. Reply (Offstage)
15. Frozen (Offstage)
16. Crushing Pennies (Offstage)

== Touring ==
The Spring Standards toured nationwide at major venues and have been featured on Conan O'Brien (August 2008), Pepsi's Poptub, USA's Royal Pains and MTV's Exiled. The band performed on The Rock Boat IX in 2009.

The Spring Standards became somewhat of a staple on New York's Rock Station 101.9 WRXP, having been invited to play The Rock Show with Matt Pinfield and Leslie Fram, including an annual appearance to sing The Pogues' holiday classic "Fairytale of New York" with Pinfield on air.

The band has toured nationwide at major venues. They have performed as an opening act for Old 97s, The Clarks, Works Progress Administration (musical group), Stephen Kellogg and the Sixers, Caravan of Thieves (band), Rustic Overtones, Rigby Fawkes, Squeeze (band), The Everybodyfields, and Glenn Tilbrook, and the Fluffers.

In 2010, the band was selected to perform at the famed Austin music festival South by Southwest. They also embarked with Joey Ryan on The Gang Goes On Tour 2010, headlined by Meg & Dia.

The band was on tour with Ha Ha Tonka throughout the Spring of 2011.

In 2012, The Spring Standards returned to South by Southwest for several performances. In preparation for their new album, they went on the road for a CD release tour in May to promote their new music. Joined by Rhett Miller & The Serial Lady Killers, The Spring Standards kicked off a US tour in June. On June 18, they appeared on Conan, and performed "Here We Go".

In February 2013, the band embarked on a six-week tour of the northeast U.S., playing in cities such as Boston, Massachusetts, Philadelphia, Pennsylvania, and Washington, DC. May 21 saw the release of their first live album, Live from Delaware (with a DVD release in 2014). That same week, they made an appearance at the Watkins Family Hour, along with singer/songwriter Dan Wilson.

In 2014 they returned to South by Southwest.

The band worked with New York composers Kerrigan-Lowdermilk, appearing in concerts and on recordings.
