= JD Eicher =

American singer-songwriter

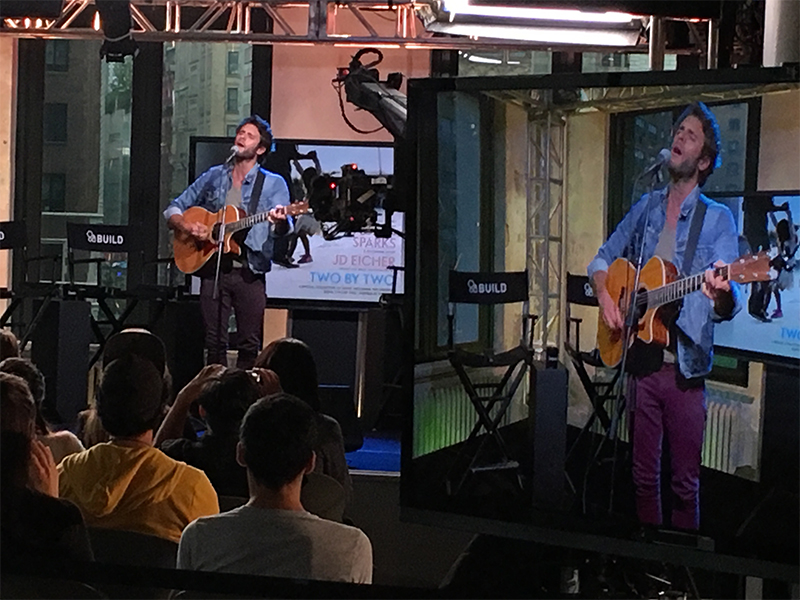
- JD Eicher performs songs from the soundtrack to the Nicholas Sparks novel Two By Two for an AOL Build livestream.

Background information
- Born: July 27, 1986 (age 40)
- Origin: Youngstown, Ohio
- Genres: alt-pop, indie
- Occupations: singer, songwriter, producer, novelist
- Instruments: vocals, guitar, keys
- Years active: 2006-present
- Labels: Rock Ridge Music, AntiFragile Music
- Member of: JD Eicher & the Goodnights
- Website: jdeicher.com

JD Eicher (born July 27, 1986) is an American singer, songwriter, producer, and novelist from the Youngstown, Ohio area.

Both billed as JD Eicher & the Goodnights and independently as JD Eicher, Eicher has released nine albums—one of which also featured a Deluxe Edition—as well as a live EP and vinyl collection of his most popular songs.

Eicher also created an EP of his music to accompany the release of Nicholas Sparks' 20th novel called Two by Two. The musician and the author toured the country to promote this project.

Touring mostly in the United States, Eicher has a strong following in many regions of the nation. Eicher also occasionally tours in Europe and has fans in many cities abroad. Additionally, a number of Eicher's songs receive radio airplay and have been used in businesses, television ad campaigns, and television shows.

== Early life ==
Eicher has always been interested in music and began playing guitar at age 12. Eicher experimented with different guitar and vocal accompaniment styles, and eventually wrote and debuted his first song while attending Canfield High School. After graduating from Canfield High School, he majored in music and business, earning a Bachelor of Science degree at Westminster College (Pennsylvania) in New Wilmington, Pennsylvania. Eicher cites as influences bands known for their lyrics ranging from Jackson Browne and The Beatles to Death Cab for Cutie.

== Career ==
While at Westminster College, Eicher formed JD Eicher & the Goodnights, and the band underwent several line-up changes over the next few years. Since 2013, Eicher has maintained a consistent rhythm section of Jim Merhaut on bass and Dylan Kollat on drums/percussion.

At college and after, the group performed at venues and festivals across the United States. Eicher, along with his group, recorded and released a trilogy of albums: The Shape of Things (2009), Shifting (2011), and Into Place (2013). The titles when combined read "The Shape of Things Shifting Into Place," and the themes tie into each other. Explains Eicher: "Each installment has its own theme that ties into an overarching concept. The Shape of Things' theme was life’s cyclicality; Shifting was a tumultuous, introspective journey through change, represented by the album’s shifting genres, musical motifs, and lyrical themes; and Into Place’s poise represents a coming of age, comfort in who you are."

JD Eicher & the Goodnights were selected as one of the top 10 unsigned bands of 2011 by Alternative Addiction magazine. The following year, Eicher signed to Rock Ridge Music, home to Steve Forbert, Sister Hazel, Reel Big Fish, among others, for a record and management deal.

For his 2016 album release, The Middle Distance, Eicher maintained the same musical personnel, however he dropped "the Goodnights" from the name of the band. Although Shifting was recorded in Bethesda, Maryland, and Into Place was recorded in Nashville, he opted to record The Middle Distance in the basement of his home in Ohio. "...pretty and poppy and flowing, the songs are best enjoyed by people who like carefully drawn lyrics," said the Pittsburgh Post-Gazette.

In 2016, Eicher provided an EP soundtrack to Nicholas Sparks' 20th novel called Two by Two. The EP features the original song, "Two by Two," as well as "Not Afraid" (alternate version, original from The Middle Distance), "Love Is Gonna Find You" (remastered from Shifting), and "The Last Love Song" (remastered from Into Place). The "Two by Two" song was featured on news shows such as Good Morning America as well as in national ad campaign in support of the novel's release.

Sparks and Eicher completed a series of United States bookstore appearances, the former signing the Two By Two book, the latter performing songs from the EP.

In 2019, Eicher released his second album, The Compass EP, under the branding of JD Eicher. F28 Music Media Live said that his lyrics, vocals, and instrumentals delivered a deep message.

Eicher's 2020 album, Court Street, was released during quarantine due to the COVID-19 pandemic. States Eicher, “This project is a lot of things, but for me it’ll go down in the books as a celebration of friendship and collaboration.” During this same time period, Eicher started a Patreon campaign and in late 2021 released an album called The Patreon Tapes. While the full album is only available to patrons, various songs from this album are available on streaming platforms and for purchase on various websites.

Also in 2021, Eicher signed a new recording deal with New York-based AntiFragile Music and in early 2022 released his first album under this record label, Majesto Sessions. This album was released in accompaniment to Eicher's first novel, titled The Lights Along Majesto, which was inspired by touring with Nicholas Sparks six years prior.

In addition to his albums, Eicher is a regular performer at a number of events, and has created his own annual event called JD's Summer Songfest. This event, which was created in 2015 and has been held in Eicher's hometown area of Youngstown, Ohio since 2017, features regional and national performers and benefits local charities.

Eicher is also a regular performer on a music cruise on the Norwegian Pearl ship called The Rock Boat. In addition, Eicher is a long-time supporter of Rock by the Sea and its charities.. At these events he has also appeared as part of a "supergroup" of Rock Boat artists, called Lovesweat. This band is made up of Eicher, Paul Pfau, Steve Everett and Conner Pledger.

Many of Eicher's songs have been used for various purposes. In addition to the aforementioned Sparks partnership, Eicher's song "Level Out" was used as promotion for Virgin America Airlines. Olive Garden used his song "Aaron" for a national ad campaign, and MTV aired the song "This is My World" featuring Eicher during their "Are You the One?" TV series. Also, a variety of alternative radio stations in Ohio, Pennsylvania, and beyond have regularly aired a variety of Eicher's songs, hosted numerous interviews, and assisted in promoting various events.

As a solo artist and with the Goodnights, Eicher has opened for or shared billing with Dave Matthews Band, Coldplay, Hot Chelle Rae, Pete Yorn, Anberlin, Rod Stewart, Bryan Adams, Maroon 5, Sister Hazel, Kelly Clarkson, Matt Nathanson, Train, Cartel, and Matt White, and others.

== Discography ==
- 2009 The Shape of Things
- 2011 Shifting
- 2012 Shifting-Deluxe Edition
- 2013 Into Place
- 2015 Live EP
- 2016 The Middle Distance
- 2017 The Two by Two Collection
- 2018 A Collection (vinyl)
- 2019 The Compass EP
- 2020 Court Street
- 2021 The Patreon Tapes
- 2022 Majesto Sessions
