= Kenny Mehler =

American singer-songwriter (born 1987)

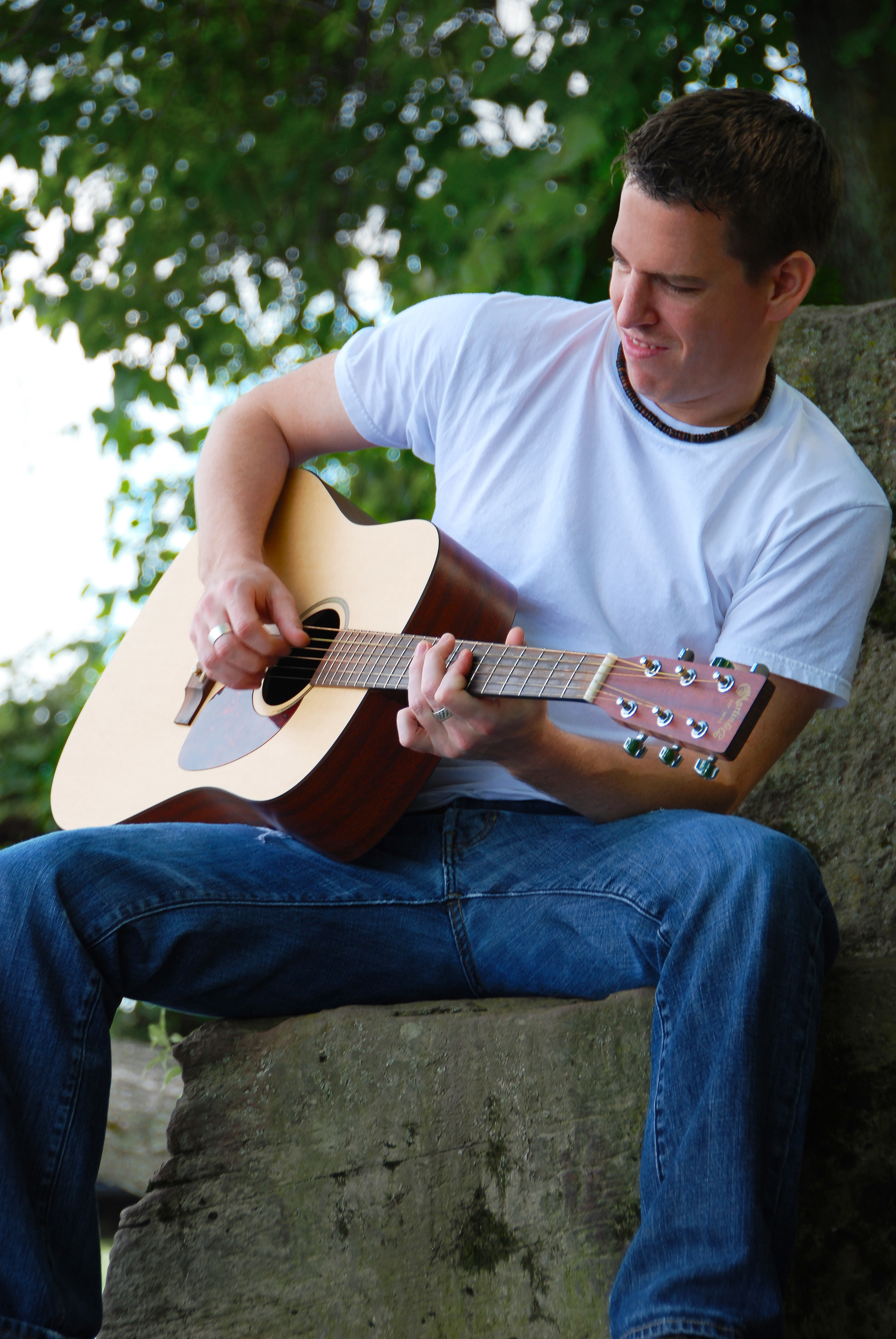
- Kenny Mehler in 2015

Background information
- Born: February 14, 1987 (age 39); Hartford, Connecticut, United States
- Origin: Connecticut, United States
- Genres: Country rock, Acoustic rock, Roots rock, Pop rock
- Occupation: Singer-songwriter
- Instruments: Vocals, Guitar
- Years active: 2007–present
- Labels: UMG, Fontana North, AEG, Subciety Records
- Website: www.kennymehler.com

Kenny Mehler (born February 14, 1987) is an American musician and singer-songwriter from Hartford, Connecticut. Mehler composes and performs music in the country rock genre, incorporating elements of acoustic rock, roots rock, and alternative country. Some of his notable songs include "Moses Brown", "Til we meet again", and "Pasadena".

== Music career ==
Mehler began his musical career in the early 2000s. He operates independently, relying on consistent touring and word of mouth rather than large-scale radio campaigns to reach audiences. Mehler performs an average of 200 or more shows annually, including various college campuses nationwide.

He performed in many towns across New England, including Trumbull, Connecticut, where Mehler and his band shared the stage with the Grammy-winning roots rock band, Train. He is a regular performer in the Killington, Vermont area and is frequently featured in The Mountain Times series "Rockin' the Region".

Over the years, Mehler has performed alongside many artists, including Eric Church, Darius Rucker, Aaron Lewis, Blackberry Smoke, Blues Traveler, Marc Broussard, Edwin McCain, Dispatch, G. Love, Pat McGee Band, and Rusted Root.

In 2012, Mehler performed on the Rock Boat, an annual floating music festival created by the Gainesville, Florida alternative rock band Sister Hazel and the Norwegian cruise line partner Sixthman. The 2012 edition of the Rock Boat sailed from New Orleans, Louisiana to Cozumel, Mexico.

In January 2013, Mehler spearheaded the creation of the largest independent live music charity concert in the state of Connecticut. "Downtown Rocks for Newtown", a benefit concert involving more than 50 bands held in downtown Hartford in response to the Sandy Hook Elementary School shooting. Mehler is also known for making annual commitments to the Make-A-Wish Foundation, as well as the St. Jude Children's Hospital.

Mehler has released several studio albums and an extensive collection of live recordings. His third studio album, Cornbread and Whiskey, was released in 2016. The album includes the tracks "Upside Down", "Hand's Up", and "Pasadena".

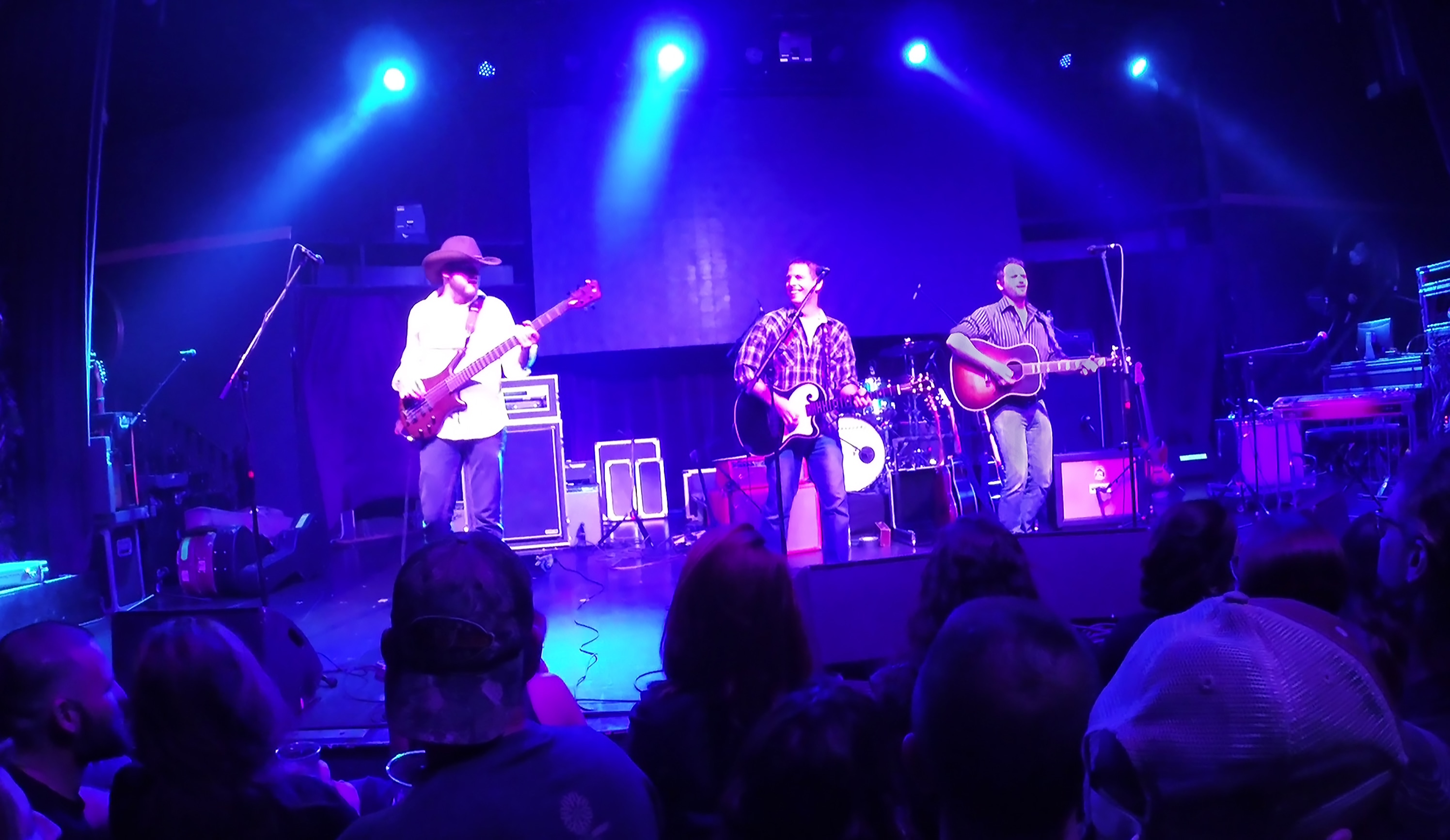
Kenny Mehler performing live at the Royale in Boston, Massachusetts on Friday, November 7, 2014

In the spring of 2016, Mehler and his band began a college tour in support of their new album Cornbread and Whiskey, concluding with a hometown show in Hartford, Connecticut at Trinity College.

On May 28, 2022, Mehler performed at the Pratt & Whitney Stadium at Rentschler Field in East Hartford, Connecticut. The band headlined a two day fanfest for the 2022 NCAA Lacrosse Championship; notably, musical artists such as Springsteen, The Rolling Stones, and The Police had also performed at the venue.

The fourth quarter of 2024 also saw the introduction of his new series, From the Vault Live, a collection of shows across two decades of concert performances throughout the United States.

- From the Vault Live – Vol. 1 - released on November 8, 2024
- From the Vault Live – Vol. 2 - released on November 14, 2024
- From the Vault Live – Vol. 3 - released on November 15, 2024
- From the Vault Live – Vol. 4 - released on November 16, 2024

== Discography ==
- Paid Mornings – Independent – 1998
- Live from the Wobbly Barn – Fivewise – 2001
- Out of Line – Fivewise – 2004
- Now – Kenny Mehler – 2007
- Now and Then – Kenny Mehler – 2010
- Live from the Hard Rock – Kenny Mehler – 2011
- Cornbread and Whiskey – Kenny Mehler Band – 2016
- Live from the Hard Rock (Deluxe Version) – Kenny Mehler – 2020
- Cornbread and Whiskey – Kenny Mehler – 2020
- Live from the Hard Rock Deluxe Version (Remastered) – Kenny Mehler – 2023
- Now and Then (2024 Remastered Edition) – Kenny Mehler – 2024
- From the Vault Live – Vol. 1 – Kenny Mehler – 2024
- From the Vault Live – Vol. 2 – Kenny Mehler – 2024
- From the Vault Live – Vol. 3 – Kenny Mehler – 2024
- From the Vault Live – Vol. 4 – Kenny Mehler – 2024
