= Fighting Gravity (band) =

- Origin: Richmond, Virginia, Virginia, United States
- Genres: Ska, Reggae, Rock, World Beat
- Years active: 1985–2007, 2017-present
- Labels: BOB Records, Mercury Records, Q Records

Fighting Gravity is an American music group based out of Richmond, Virginia. Originally a ska band called bOb (boy O boy), Fighting Gravity has incorporated a variety of other music styles, including reggae, rock, and world beat. Fighting Gravity was formed while its original members were attending Virginia Tech

In August 1997, Fighting Gravity was the subject of a seven-page article in Rolling Stone by senior editor David Wild as part of the summer college issue. The band has maintained a large fanbase.

== History ==
In 2007, Fighting Gravity, along with Dave Matthews Band, Barenaked Ladies, Guster, and O.A.R., took part in the IZStyle Winter Tour, a series of concerts aimed at raising awareness of alternative and renewable energy sources. The band's last official shows were in the 2007 time frame. Since 2017 the band has been playing just a handful of concerts which has most of the core members that toured and recorded on their releases. Fighting Gravity performed a few reunion shows in 2017, with the last of the year being performed as part of the 102.1 The X Miracle on Broad Street Tour at The National in Richmond on December 26 and 27, along with The NorVa on the 28th and a D.C. show in Spring 2019.

== Musical style ==
Around 2003 Fighting Gravity's musical style evolved to a more modern guitar driven rock. Overall the change was welcome by most fans and their last guitar driven record is considered one of their best.

== Awards and accolades ==
Fighting Gravity has sold more than 800,000 albums of their 11 releases and performed before millions of people in the United States and abroad, including many foreign counties all over the world such as Tokyo, Japan and Honduras, and performed several USO tours overseas for United States troops. Fighting Gravity was supported by over 150,000 email subscribers and 1,500 street team members that helped promote the band all over the US.

== Band members ==
The band started at Virginia Tech and consisted of founder David Triano "tree"(guitarist/songwriter/vocalist), founder David Peterson (songwriter/bassist/vocalist), Tim Greening (vocals), Jamie Bruce (Drummer), Jane Roebuck and Tim Altman (Trumpets), Dee Campbell (Keyboards), and Johnny Edens (Sax). Tommy Brennan replaced Bruce on drums and prior to relocating to Richmond, VA, Mike Boyd replaced Brennan as the drummer.

When band relocated to Richmond, VA in the summer of 1989 they found their permanent lead vocalist Schiavone McGee "Vonz", and keyboardist Eric Lawson, trumpeter Jim Pennington, trombonist Chris Leitch. In 1995, Pennington departed and was replaced by saxophonist Karl von Klein. In 1996, Chris Leitch departed and was replaced by trombonist/percussionist/keyboardist John Utley. In 1997, Karl von Klein departed, replaced by saxophonist Mike Ghegan. In 1999, Ghegan departed and was replaced by trombonist/turntablist Stefan Demetriadis. Michael Sauri briefly replaced Triano in 2000. Triano came back on guitar for another year of touring around 2001-2002. Guitarist Rich Stine replaced Triano in 2003. Other former members include guitarists Philippe Herndon and Sinakone Phrakhansa.

All members have continued to be active musicians. Since the breakup, Mike Boyd took the position as the Director of Performing Arts at the Collegiate School in Richmond, Virginia. Schiavone McGee toured in support of a solo CD released in October 2010 entitled My Only Secret, and then went on to perform as a vocalist for the band In Full. Rich Stine went on to form and play in Elevator to Space and toured with Stephen Kellogg and the Sixers for a short time before moving on to music production and engineering. Philippe Herndon founded Caroline Guitar Company, an effects pedal company. Their first pedal, the Wave Cannon distortion, was released in 2010. Dave Peterson went on to promoting concerts throughout Virginia with Seven Hills Presents. Karl von Klein is currently the jazz and orchestra instructor at the Maggie L. Walker Governor's School. Jim Pennington was the band director at Freeman High School and is now the band director at Deep Run High School. Eric Lawson continues to perform as keyboardist for Flat Elvis, a Richmond-based '80s band. Eric is also a freelance music journalist.

== Discography ==
=== Studio albums ===
- Boy O Boy O Boy (1991)
- Shish-ska-BOB (1992)
- Bobsled (1992)
- No Stopping, No Standing (1994)
- Forever=One Day (1996)
- Everywhere and In Between (1998) (MP3.com album)
- You and Everybody Else (1998)
- Hello Cleveland (1999) (live album)
- Flood Zone (2000) (live album)
- Under the Radar (2001) (live acoustic album)
- Blue Sky and Black (2006)
