= Bronze Radio Return =

American indie/roots rock band

- Origin: Hartford, Connecticut, U.S.
- Genres: Roots rock, alternative rock, indie rock
- Years active: 2007–present
- Labels: DigSin, independent, AntiFragile, independent
- Members: Chris Henderson; Rob Griffith; Matt Warner; Patrick Fetkowitz
- Past members: Dan Travis; Bob Tanen; Craig Struble
- Website: Bronze Radio Return

Bronze Radio Return is an American indie/roots rock band from Hartford, Connecticut. The group was formed by Chris Henderson after he attended the Hartt School of Music at the University of Hartford. The current lineup consists of Henderson (guitar/vocals), Hartt School alumni Rob Griffith (drums/vocals) and Matt Warner (organ/keyboards/vocals), and Patrick "Packy" Fetkowitz (guitar). The name Bronze Radio Return was inspired by an old radio Henderson grew up listening to in his father's art studio in Maine. As of 2021, the band has released five full-length studio albums, one live album, three compilation albums and several EPs.

== History ==
Bronze Radio Return was formed in Hartford, Connecticut in 2007 by Chris Henderson. Producer Doug Derryberry (Bruce Hornsby, Ben Folds Five) discovered Bronze Radio Return at a show in New York City, and produced their first self-titled EP in 2008. In 2009, the band collaborated with producer/multi-instrumentalist Chad Copelin in Nashville to produce their first album, Old-Time Speaker. Songs from Old Time Speaker were licensed by Hollister Co. (Digital Love – Labor Day Playlist 2009) and the new CW Series 90210 (Lo-Fi on Season 3:305 Catch Me if You Cannon). The album also charted in the College Music Journal (CMJ) Top 200, where it peaked at No. 102, charted in the top 10 and even reached No. 1 for weeks on several stations. In the Oklahoma City Audition episode of 12th season of American Idol, the song "Worth Wondering" was used during the pre-audition back-story for contestant Nate Tao.

The band's second album, Shake! Shake! Shake!, was also produced by Chad Copelin, and was recorded in Norman and Tulsa Oklahoma. The album was released on March 29, 2011, and debuted at No. 4 on the Billboard NE Heatseakers Chart. The album also made the College Music Journal (CMJ) Top 200 List, where it peaked at No. 129. Songs from the album have been licensed by American Eagle Hollister, Anthony Bourdain's Travel Channel show The Layover (Season 1, Six Episodes), HBO's 24/7 Flyers/Rangers Road to the NHL Winter Classic, CW's Hart of Dixie (Season 1-116:Tributes and Triangles) and Polo Ralph Lauren. The song "Shake, Shake, Shake" was used in two 2012 American Idol episodes, a 2013 American Idol episode, and on a Behr Paint/Home Depot commercial.

In 2010, the band signed to DigSin (Universal). The band released songs from three albums (Shake! Shake! Shake!; Up, On & Over; and Light Me Up) as singles via DigSin.

Pandora Internet Radio featured Bronze Radio Return in their first ever "Indie Artist Spotlight" Blog where they noted that the band "attributed a large part of their [independent] success to being on Pandora". Bronze Radio Return was named one of Taco Bell's 2012 Feed the Beat Artists. Nissan featured "Shake, Shake, Shake" for their new global Nissan Leaf campaign which began in the fall of 2012. The PGA Tour and FedEx used a previously unreleased song "Further On" for their 2013 FedEx Cup commercial "Born for This." The PGA commercial was also featured by ESPN. Their single "Further On" was featured in the trailer for Bill Murray movie, St. Vincent. The band's third album, Up, On & Over, was released in 2013 and was produced again by Copelin. The album debuted at #17 on the Billboard Heatseekers chart, landed in the Top 30 on the iTunes Alternative chart and Top 130 overall. Google Play, Slacker Radio and Amazon all featured the lead single "Further On". The record was also featured as a part of the Pandora Premieres series the week before its release.

The band signed a publishing deal with Round Hill Music in 2014. They released their fourth studio album, Light Me Up, in 2015.

In 2019, the band signed with AntiFragile Music to release their full-length, Entertain You.

The band released a three-album set of compilations, Burner, Chillers, and Back Burners, from 2021 to 2022.

== Discography ==
=== Albums ===
- Old Time Speaker (2009)
- Shake! Shake! Shake! (2011)
- Up, On & Over (2013)
- Light Me Up (2015)
- Entertain You (2019)

=== Live album ===
- Live from Brooklyn and Then Some (2016)

=== EPs ===
- Bronze Radio Return EP (2008)
- Check One (2018)
- Check Two (2018)

=== Compilation albums ===
- Burners (2021)
- Chillers (2021)
- Back Burners (2022)

== Music Licensing - TV / Film / Advertising / Branding ==
The band's music has been featured in the following TV shows, movies, commercials, and branding opportunities:

- Salomon Freeski TV S6 E04 - "Glasnost Ski" (TV Series: SalomonFreeskiTV)
- Nissan (Commercial)
- Starbucks (Commercial)
- St. Vincent (Movie 2014)
- PGA Tour - FedEX Cup (Commercial)
- American Idol (TV series: FOX)
- Shameless (TV series: Showtime)
- Blue Moon Brewing Company (Commercial)
- Southwest Airlines - Live At 35 (Branding)
- Victoria's Secret Fashion Show (TV)
- Olive Garden (Commercial)
- Coca Cola - World Cup (Commercial)
- Cost Cutters (Commercial)
- Bayer: One-A-Day Vitamins (Commercial)
- The Gambler (Movie 2014)
- Crashing (TV series: HBO)
- New Amsterdam (TV series: NBC)
- Roadies (TV series: Showtime)
- Behr Paint / Home Depot (Commercial)
- LightLife Burger (Commercial)
- Taco Bell - Feed The Beat (Branding)
- The Magician (TV series: NBC)
- Sneaky Pete (TV series: Amazon Prime)
- Music City (TV series: CMT)
- Academy Sports (Commercial)
- 24/7 (TV series: HBO)
- Spice Island (Commercial)
- 90210 (TV series: CW)
- Hart Of Dixie (TV series: CW)
- The Fosters (TV series: ABC Family)
- Unhung Hero (Documentary: Showtime)
- Discover Card (Commercial)
- The Layover with Anthony Bourdain (TV series: Travel Channel)
- Shentel Communications (Commercial)
- Adventist Health (Commercial)
- 16 And Pregnant (TV series: MTV)
- Catfish (TV series: MTV)
- The Real World (TV series: MTV)
- Criminal Minds (TV series: CBS)
- Necessary Roughness (TV series: USA)
- The Rookie (TV series: ABC)
- NCAA Basketball (TV series: ESPN)
- NFL Playoffs (TV series: FOX)
- The French Open (Sporting: Various)
- Morning Drive (TV series: Golf Channel)
- Jane Mansfield's Car (Movie Trailer)
- Switched At Birth (TV series: ABC Family)
- Delicacy (Movie Trailer)
- Hollister (Branding)
- Alone Together (Short Film)
- Practically Joking (Short Film)
- Summer's Shadown (Movie 2014)
- Rachel Ray Show (TV series)
- The Real O'Neals (TV series - ABC)
- Major League Baseball (TV series - MLB Network)
- Topshop (web)
- Lincoln (web)
- Easton Baseball (web)
- Love Under The Olive Tree (TV series - Hallmark)

== Appearances ==
Along with many national tours across the USA, Bronze Radio Return has performed music festivals including: Bonnaroo, Lollapalooza, Firefly Festival, Hangout Music Festival, Bunbury, Live In The Vineyard, SXSW (x4), Mountain Jam, Gathering of the Vibes, Summerfest, Floydfest, Bristol Rhythm and Roots Festival, The Rock Boat (x5), Cayamo, Live Loud and Musikfest (x4).

In October 2010, the band performed for President Barack Obama in October 2010, at a rally in Bridgeport, Connecticut. On October 30, 2010, the band was called to fill in for a high-profile artist who failed to pass the Secret Service background check to be near President Obama at a rally in the Webster Bank Arena in Bridgeport, CT. The band was introduced to a crowd of 10,000 people by hip-hop mogul Russell Simmons before the Obama addressed the crowd. Snippets of the band's performance appeared on CNN that day.

In October 2013, the band took part in the "Live At 35" series, hosted by Southwest Airlines. The band boarded a flight from Denver to Minneapolis and surprised passengers with an unexpected mid-flight concert. The band huddled around the flight attendant's microphone, while performing acoustic renditions of their songs, while passengers watched and filmed the experience. The band admitted it to be their most unique performance to date. "It was the first time turbulence became a factor in one of our shows" said the band members.

The band has participated in 7 music festivals at sea, including the Rock Boat (five times), Cayamo, and Live Loud, all hosted by concert promoters, Sixthman, in conjunction with Norwegian and Carnival Cruise Lines.

In 2016, the band toured Europe with the Dunwells, with stops all over the UK, France, Germany and The Netherlands.

In 2017, the band traveled to Shanghai, China to perform 2 shows at the Concrete And Grass Festival.
