= Adam Richman (singer) =

American indie pop singer-songwriter (born 1982)

- Born: 1982 (age 42–43); Allentown, Pennsylvania, U.S.
- Genres: Indie pop
- Occupation(s): Musician, record producer
- Years active: 2001–present
- Labels: Or Music
- Website: www.adamrichman.com

Adam Richman (born in 1982) is an American indie pop singer-songwriter, best known for his making multi-track, multi-instrument recordings.

== Early life and education ==
Richman was born in 1982 in Allentown, Pennsylvania, where he grew up recording songs using piano, guitar, and drums on a multi-track tape player. He is a graduate of Parkland High School in South Whitehall Township, Pennsylvania, and attended George Washington University for one year before dropping out to pursue a music career.

== Career ==
Richman's first EP was recorded independently in his dormitory at George Washington University. It was picked up and distributed by CD Baby. Richman toured constantly with 100 to 150 gigs a year. Richman has been an opening act for The Roots, Simple Plan, and Matisyahu.

In 2005, Richman was signed by the independent label Or Music. Richman appeared at SXSW and toured nationally to support his first full-length album, Patience and Science, opening for artists such as Puffy AmiYumi and Better than Ezra, and joined in the "Around the Clock Tour" with The Rocket Summer, This Day and Age, Socratic, and Sherwood. He was on the 2006 Rock Boat "floating festival".

His songs include "Mary-Anne", "Suck It Up", and "Broken Glass". His single "The Loneliness Song" has a music video produced by the Nova Project.

Richman was also briefly in the band the Consequence which later changed their name to Cash Cash.

== Personal life ==
Richman built a personal studio in his parents' basement after spending nine months working with a professional team on an album project, scrapping the album for greater creative control. He would record his next two records from his personal studio.

Richman also works as a producer, including for records such as Speechwriters LLC's The Bull Moose After Party. He now lives in New York City. In 2010, Richman opened his own recording studio in Brooklyn called The Bucket NYC. In March 2013, he announced via his tumblr page that he and Daniel Rinaldi wrote and recorded three new songs and that The Reign of Kindo were using Bucket Studios for tracking sessions.

== Discography ==
- Two LP, self-published, 2002
- Patience EP, Or Music, 2004
- Patience and Science LP, Or Music, 2005
