= Brett Newski =

American singer-songwriter

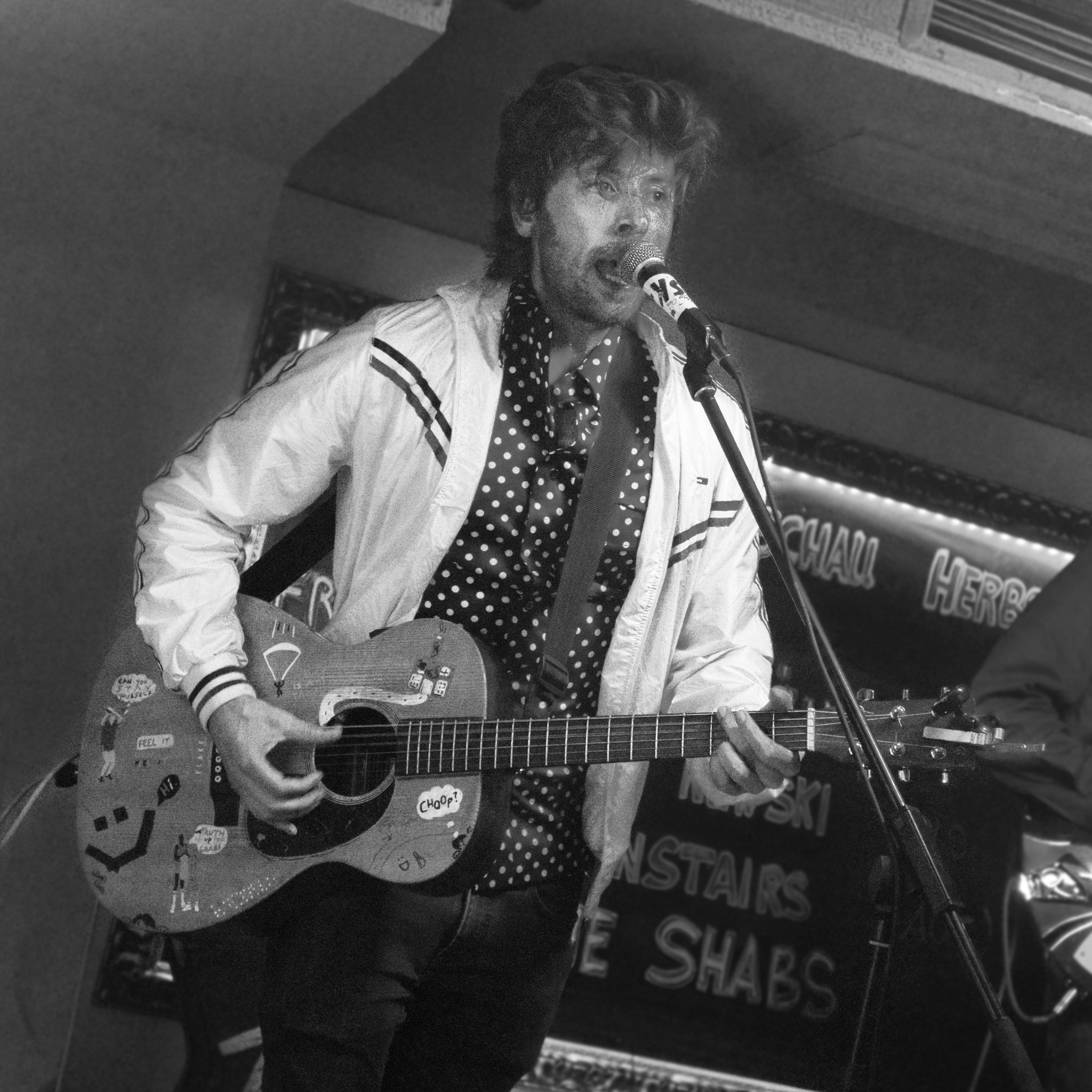
- Brett Newski during his concert at Pub Bart in Timelkam, Austria on 2023-10-27.

Background information
- Born: December 27, 1986 (age 39)
- Origin: Ho Chi Minh City, Vietnam, Milwaukee, Wisconsin
- Genres: D.I.Y. Folk Punk; Indie Rock; Alternative Rock; 90's Rock
- Years active: 2009–present
- Labels: Yes Please Records; Good Land Records; Make My Day Records
- Members: Brett Newski; Steve Vorass; Sean “Tubs” Anderson
- Past members: Mean Matt Green; Jeffro Ganter; Alex Bunke; Harrison Dole; Matt Spatola; Sam Lyons; Greg Rotiek

Brett Newski (born Brett Wisniewski, December 27, 1986) is a North American nomad, songwriter, podcaster, illustrator, author, and Alternative guitarist for the Milwaukee, Wisconsin indie rock band NEWSKI. He has collaborated on songs with Matthew Caws of Nada Surf, Steven Page of Barenaked Ladies, Ryan Miller of Guster, H Burns, and Brian Vander Ark of The Verve Pipe.

In 2011, he toured Southeast Asia alone for six months until completing his first solo LP, In Between Exits, while on the road. The album was written and recorded in budget hostels and apartments across Thailand, Vietnam, Hong Kong, Korea and the Philippines. Coined the “Homeless in Asia Tour”, Newski completed 30 shows in unconventional venues including Couchsurfer Apartments, a Vietnamese convenience store, an underground Korean record shop, and residential rooftops in Hong Kong while also playing club shows. During his time living in Vietnam he wrote advertising jingles for Saatchi & Saatchi.

In 2012, Newski completed a 20-date tour across South Africa in support of "In Between Exits", traveling exclusively on public transportation. The same year he formed the band “Brett Newski & the Corruption” in Vietnam with drummer Mean Matt Green (UK) and bassist Jeffro Ganter (Vancouver, Canada). The band toured across the US and Asia. The members lived in Saigon, Vietnam (aka Ho Chi Minh City) and released one album, Tiny Victories. Their sound has been compared to Weezer, REM, The Hives, The Pixies, and The Violent Femmes; His travels would later spawn the YouTube travel show "Crusty Adventures", documenting the comedic underbelly of DIY touring in Europe, Australia and America.

In 2014, Newski released his second solo album, American Folk Armageddon, on Good Land Records. The album evoked comparisons to Jack White. The album was picked up by German record label Make My Day Records for European release. Newski toured extensively in 2014 to support the album, including tours with Rocky Votolato in Europe, Pete Donnelly and Carter Hulsey in the US, and Jon Shaban in South Africa.

Newski continued touring in 2015, playing shows in South Africa, Europe and the United States. In June 2015, Newski released the Victor DeLorenzo produced cassette, "Hi-fi D.I.Y," followed by "Land Air Sea Garage" which received notable press in Rolling Stone, Paste and The Boston Globe.

Newski was recently on tour as the opening act for the Violent Femmes. His latest release "Life Upside Down" received notable praise with Rolling Stone, WXRTin Chicago, WXPN in Philadelphia, KCMP "The Current" in MPLS, WRLT "Lightning 100" in Nashville and Paste, leading to support shows with Pixies, Manchester Orchestra, New Pornographers, Chuck Ragan, Courtney Barnett, and Ike Reilly.

Newski’s podcast Dirt from the Road discusses musicians strangest road stories and dives into maintaining sound mental health as an artist/traveler. Guests have included Dashboard Confessional, All American Rejects, The Lumineers, Manitowoc Minute, Joe List, Fruit Bats (band), We Are Scientists, Toad the Wet Sprocket, Verve Pipe, Cloud Nothings, Stephen Kellogg, Frank Turner, Barenaked Ladies' co-founder Steven Page, Heartless Bastards, Noah Guthrie, The Thermals, and The Von Bondies.

In 2021 Newski released the book "It's Hard to be a Person: Defeating Anxiety, Surviving the World, and Having More Fun," blending humor with mental health struggles in a collection of illustrations. Newski states the drawings began as a cathartic joke to make fun of his own anxieties. The book was picked up by Billboard, NPR, American Songwriter, NBC, and CBS. The first pressing sold out within one month.

Comedian Charlie Berens stated "When I’m on the road doing comedy, half my job is anxiety. Brett's book is a great tool for how to use that energy. And the best part is, when I’m too lazy to read, I can just look at the pictures".

Stelth Ulvang of The Lumineers stated "I love how easy Newski makes it to plow through the dark stuff with some well placed humor and grit".

== Albums ==
- In Between Exits (2011, Yes Please Records)
- In Between Exits (Extended Release) (2012, Yes Please Records)
- Saigon At Night (2012, Yes Please Records)
- "Tiny Victories" (2013, Yes Please Records)
- American Folk Armageddon (2014, Good Land Records)
- Hi-fi D.I.Y. (2015, Breadking Records)
- Land Air Sea Garage (2016, Nomad Union)
- The Worst of Brett Newski (2017, Nomad Union)
- Life Upside Down (2018, Nomad Union)
- Going Solo is Better than Being Alone: Live in Wisconsin (2019, Nomad Union)
- Don't Let the Bastards Get You Down (2020, Nomad Union)
- It's Hard to Be a Person: Soundtrack to the Book (2021, Nomad Union)
- Theoretical Soul EP (2022, Nomad Union)
- Friend Rock (2023, Nomad Union)
