= The Rocketboys =

- Origin: Austin, Texas
- Genres: Indie rock Pop rock Ambient rock Alternative rock
- Years active: 2005–present
- Label: None
- Members: Josh Campbell; Brandon Kinder; Justin Wiseman; Lang Freeman
- Past members: Philip Ellis; Kyle Samuel; Alex Bhore; Mitch Holt; Daniel Wheeler; Scott Delony; Josh Rodgers; Jordan Gibbs
- Website: http://www.therocketboys.com

The Rocketboys is an indie rock band from Austin, Texas.

== History ==
Formerly known as Homer Hiccolm & the Rocketboys, the band formed late 2005 in Abilene, Texas. The original line-up met while they were attending Abilene Christian University. Singer Brandon Kinder entered the (at that time) informal group in a college battle-of-the-bands and needed a name. Homer Hiccolm & the Rocketboys, an idea inspired by the movie October Sky he had randomly had in mind for a while, was the first name to come to mind.

In 2009, the band shortened their name to simply The Rocketboys after relocating to Austin, Texas, where the band's members currently reside.

In early 2009, drummer (and creator of P. Ellis Drums) Philip Ellis left the band. Replacing Ellis was Alex Bhore, former drummer of The New Frontiers. Bhore left the band, however, in fall 2010 to join This Will Destroy You full-time. Guitarists and original members Daniel Wheeler and Mitch Holt also decided to part ways with the group in late 2010 to allocate more of their time to be home with their families and to pursue their other endeavors outside of the band.

After a long writing period, remaining members Brandon, Josh, and Justin, along with new drummer Josh Rodgers, released "Build Anyway", in June 2012. The rest of 2012 and 2013 was spent on the road with bands such as Relient K, The Almost, The Mowgli's, Kopecky Family Band, Dinner and a Suit, and Mike Mains & the Branches. Their music continued to feature in numerous TV shows, indie movies and commercials.

In 2014, The Rocketboys signed to Black Magnetic Records and recorded an EP with producer Joe Chiccarelli at Sunset Sound Studios in Hollywood. The EP, "Left | Right" was released January 6, 2015, to coincide with the use of their song "Viva Voce" in the final season of the TV show "Glee" where it was the signature song of new character "Roderick".

== Sing, Bird, Sing EP ==
In May 2007, The Rocketboys spent several months recording their first studio EP, Sing, Bird, Sing. Once released, the EP was an immediate success and garnered impressive reviews from such media outlets as Paste Magazine, The Austin American-Statesman and HM Magazine. Songs like "Heartbeat" and "Do I Wake or Sleep?" became favorites and quickly pushed The Rocketboys into the regional spotlight. In January 2008, "Do I Wake or Sleep?", a song from the EP, appeared on the Paste Magazine sampler CD, and in 2010 several songs from the EP appeared on TV shows including Keeping Up with the Kardashians and The Real World.

== 20,000 Ghosts ==
In 2009 the band recorded its first full-length album, 20,000 Ghosts, which was engineered and produced by Louie Lino (Nada Surf, Matt Pond PA), mastered by Alan Douches (Sufjan Stevens, Animal Collective) and features artwork from Dark Was The Night artist, Ryan Feerer. In 2010, songs from the album were heard on The Real World, Keeping Up with the Kardashians, and The Buried Life.

== Wellwisher ==
In 2010, The Rocketboys garnered both musical and financial support from friends and fans to create its latest EP "Wellwisher". "Wellwisher" was recorded while on tour with Lydia in July and Death on Two Wheels in August 2010 by friend and touring FOH engineer Will Krienke (who was later assisted by Joey Benjamin). The band utilized many talented friends (such as BMI rep/violinist David Claassen, harpist/artist Timbre, England in 1819, the PASTE Magazine staff, and a church choir in Memphis) along the way in locations ranging from the van to living rooms to professional studios.

Financially the project was backed by fans using Kickstarter where fans were encouraged to donate money to fund in the album in exchange for creative incentives ranging from tickets to shows to having the band cover a song of the backer's choosing.

Singer Brandon Kinder described "Wellwisher" not as a concept album but a concept experience. The musical collaboration, nomadic recording process, and communal funding of the project combined with the lyrical themes of unity, brotherhood and relationships, all contributed to and exuded from the final product.

== Build Anyway ==
Following the departure of two founding members of the group (Daniel Wheeler & Mitch Holt) the band debated continuing. Kinder focused on a side project, "The Wealthy West" and wrote several tracks for TV & movies but eventually the three remaining members began testing out new material throughout the fall of 2011. Recording in their own studio and enlisting mixer CJ Eiriksson (U2, Phish), the band completed "Build Anyway" in April 2012 and released it on June 5, 2012.

== Left | Right ==
Signing with Black Magnetic Records (whose other artists include A Great Big World and Dead Sara), the band recorded 4 tracks with Joe Chiccarelli at Sunset Sound Studios in Hollywood, CA. during June 2014. The resulting EP, "Left | Right" was released January 6, 2015

== Touring ==
Over the past several years, The Rocketboys have toured nationally with The Mowgli's, Kopecky Family Band, Relient K, and The Almost, and have played shows both locally and nationally with many acclaimed bands/artists such as Eisley, Bob Schneider, Grizzly Bear, Twenty One Pilots, The Octopus Project, This Will Destroy You, The Appleseed Cast, Lydia, Balmorhea, and St. Vincent, to name a few. In addition, The Rocketboys have appeared at festivals nationwide such as Austin City Limits, Suburbia Fest, Next Big Nashville, South By Southwest, Bragg Jam, Fareveller, CMJ, and Cornerstone Festival.

== TV licensing ==
The Rocketboys, and Kinder (both solo and under the moniker "The Wealthy West") have had numerous songs on TV shows including "Private Practice" The Real World Washington, D.C. ,The Buried Life, Glee, Royals, Last Sparks Of Sundown, One Tree Hill and many more.

Additionally Kinder wrote and performs (with David Ramirez) the theme song for Discovery Channel's Bering Sea Gold.

== Other ==
- Former member Philip Ellis started a custom drum company called P. Ellis Drums.
- The band performed at author Homer Hickam's birthday party in 2008 and maintain a healthy relationship with the former namesake to this day.
- Singer Brandon Kinder released a solo EP in May 2011 under the name The Wealthy West.
- Kinder also wrote and performed the theme song for Discovery Channel's "Bering Sea Gold" which features Austin artist David Ramirez.

== Discography ==
=== Full Lengths ===
- 20,000 Ghosts (Self Released, 2009)
- Build Anyway (Self Released, 2012)
- Certain Circles (CandyShop Recordings, 2017)

=== EPs ===
- Left|Right (Black Magnetic, 2015)
- Wellwisher (Self Released, 2010)
- Sing, Bird, Sing (Self Released, 2007)
- South Plains (Self Released, 2005)

=== Live albums/DVD ===
- Live at Antone's CD/DVD (Self Released, 2008)
- Colder Nights of Texas Live CD/DVD (Self Released, 2006)
