= Andrew Leahey =

American singer, songwriter, guitarist and journalist

- Born: November 5, 1982 (age 43); Richmond, Virginia
- Genres: Roots rock and roll
- Instruments: Guitars, vocals
- Years active: 2004–present
- Labels: Skyline Music, Thirty Tigers, Mule Kick Records
- Website: andrewleaheymusic.com

Andrew Leahey is an American roots and rock and roll musician, and also a music journalist. His band, Andrew Leahey & the Homestead, has released four albums and one EP.

As a journalist, Leahey has written for Rolling Stone, Spin, AllMusic, The Washington Times, and others.

== Early life ==
Leahey was born in Richmond, Virginia. His mother was a former music teacher and an active classical vocalist, giving him a formal musical education. At six, he was already playing piano and guitar. His parents played soundtracks such as Good Morning, Vietnam, The Big Chill and American Graffiti in their home, and Leahey developed an interest in rock and roll. His influences were Bruce Springsteen, Tom Petty, and R.E.M. As a teenager, he played guitar, sang in local bars and clubs, and performed in classical choirs.

Leahey graduated from J.R. Tucker High School in 2001, then went to University of Virginia, where he formed and fronted his first band called Hobson's Choice. The band toured regionally, released an independent EP in 2004, then split up the next year.

When he graduated from college in 2005, Leahey moved to New York, New York, and got a job as an intern at Spin magazine. He also joined Juilliard Choral Union, and performed at Carnegie Hall and Lincoln Center.

In 2007, Leahey moved to Ann Arbor, Michigan so he could join the writing staff of the online music database AllMusic (allmusic.com). While in the midwest, he married his wife, Emily, in 2009. He left the music database site in 2011 when the couple moved to Nashville, Tennessee.

== Music career ==
In Nashville, Leahey has played guitar, recorded and toured with many artists, appearing onstage with Elizabeth Cook, Rodney Crowell, Drew Holcomb, Will Hoge, and Butch Walker. In addition, he wrote for magazines and newspapers, and also recorded four albums and an EP with his band, Andrew Leahey & the Homestead.

=== Andrew Leahey & the Homestead album, Summer Sleeves EP ===
Leahey planned to record his first album as a solo project, but liked working with others and formed a band called The Homestead. They recorded their debut, entitled Andrew Leahey & the Homestead and it was released August 2011. With that album, and the Summer Sleeves EP released in 2013, Leahey refined his roots rock and roll, guitar-oriented music style. Both releases are out of print.

=== Skyline in Central Time album ===
In 2013, after completing a tour with his band, Leahey developed difficulties with the hearing in his right ear. He was diagnosed with an acoustic neuroma, a non-cancerous tumor on the nerve that led to his inner ear and affected his balance. The location of the tumor was precarious, but he opted for a surgical procedure to remove it. Surgeons at Vanderbilt's Skull Base Center performed a 10-hour surgery, and afterwards he retained approximately 70 percent of his hearing.

After a lengthy recovery period, Leahey recorded and released his second album, Skyline in Central Time, in August 2016. Themes reflected his recent medical experience. The album was produced by drummer, Wilco co-founder and Grammy Award winner, Ken Coomer, and released by Thirty Tigers.

Now recovered from his surgery, Leahey along with his band, The Homestead, did 180 shows on tour to support Skyline in Central Time.

=== Airwaves album ===
In March 2019, Leahey & The Homestead released their third album, Airwaves. The eleven songs were produced by Paul Ebersol, and reflected the rock and roll influences of Leahey's youth, as well as more recent artists.

"I was raised on FM radio, back when you could still hear legends like Bruce Springsteen and Tom Petty on the Top 40. Listening to those guys felt like going to rock & roll school. Years later, that same sound — big, guitar-driven, hook-heavy — still feels like home to me,” Leahey told Rolling Stone.

The title track, "Airwaves", is a tribute to that FM rock and roll radio Leahey grew up with, and the album includes a cover of Echo & the Bunnymen's "Lips Like Sugar".

=== American Static, Vol. 1 and Vol. 2 albums ===
Over the course of the COVID-19 pandemic, Leahey and his band recorded 18 songs that were debuted during an Andrew Leahey: Live & Online livestream residency, which featured one performance from his home each week for a year. The material became a double album, American Static, Vol. 1 released October 2021, and American Static, Vol. 2 released May 2022.

== Journalism career ==
Throughout his recording and performing career, Leahey has continued as a journalist for a variety of newspapers and magazines. This includes Rolling Stone, Spin, American Songwriter, Paste, AllMusic and the Washington Times.
