= Florez (band) =

US musical group

- Origin: Nashville, Tennessee
- Genres: Rock, pop, soul
- Years active: 2002–present
- Publisher: CD Baby
- Members: Alex Florez; Erik Huffman
- Past members: Dana Brewster; Dusty Emerick; Josh Robinson

Florez is an American rock band based in Nashville, Tennessee. The duo consists of singer-guitarist Alex Florez and bassist Erik Huffman. The band has released three full-length albums and two EPs.

Alex Florez and Erik Huffman met during their university days at Furman University in South Carolina. They founded Florez in 2002, originally a five-piece that also included guitarist Dana Brewster, multi-instrumentalist Dusty Emerick, and drummer Josh Robinson. Justin Kitchen is now the touring drummer with the band.

The band shared stages with music artists such as Gavin DeGraw, Better Than Ezra and Will Hoge. Veteran producer Ed Cash worked with the band for their full-length album debut In Flight, released in 2005. In 2006, their song "Natalie" was played on an episode of the TV series Scrubs. Erik Huffman appeared as a contestant on Survivor: China in 2007 . He has also appeared in the Boys Like Girls featuring Taylor Swift video clip "Two is Better than one"
