= Harvest Caye =

Private island

Coordinates: 16.4783°N 88.4039°W

Harvest Caye is a private island owned by Norwegian Cruise Line, located in southern Belize. The caye features wildlife exhibitions including a blue morpho butterfly house.

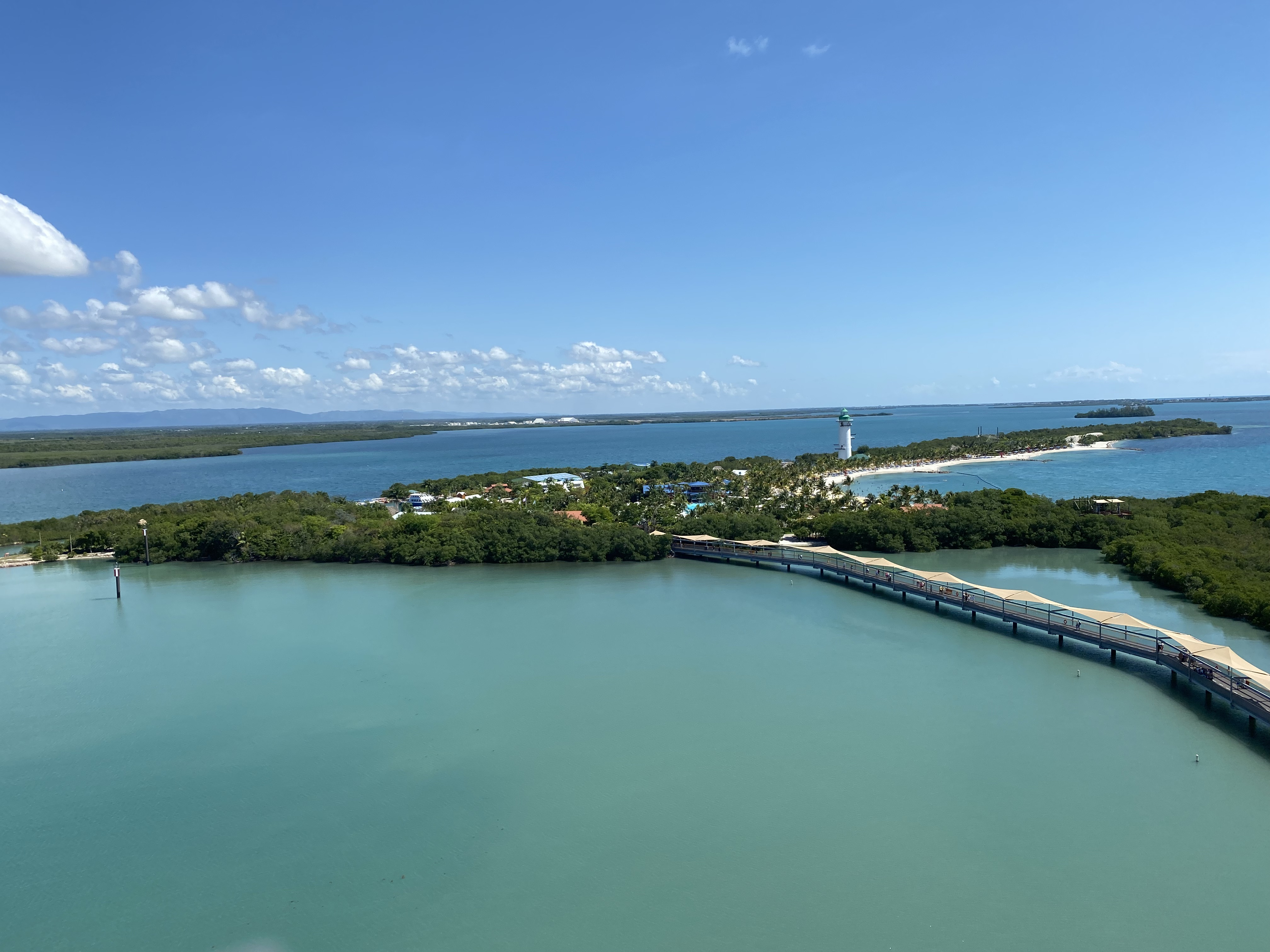
Aerial photograph

On May 23, 2017, personnel from Harvest Caye, accompanied by Edgar Correa of the Belize Forestry Department, removed a juvenile Scarlet Macaw from Belize Bird Rescue to add to Harvest Caye's wildlife exhibits. Belize Bird Rescue, a non-profit organization dedicated to rehabilitating and releasing rescued wildlife, strongly objected to this action, arguing that the bird was healthy and a good release candidate and should not be kept permanently in captivity. The confiscation was also condemned by the Belize Audubon Society and has become a significant controversy for the resort.

== See also ==
- Little Stirrup Cay - a private island used by Royal Caribbean Cruises
- Castaway Cay - a private island used by Disney Cruise Line
- Great Stirrup Cay - another private island by Norwegian Cruise Line
- Private island
