= Five Star Iris =

American alternative rock band

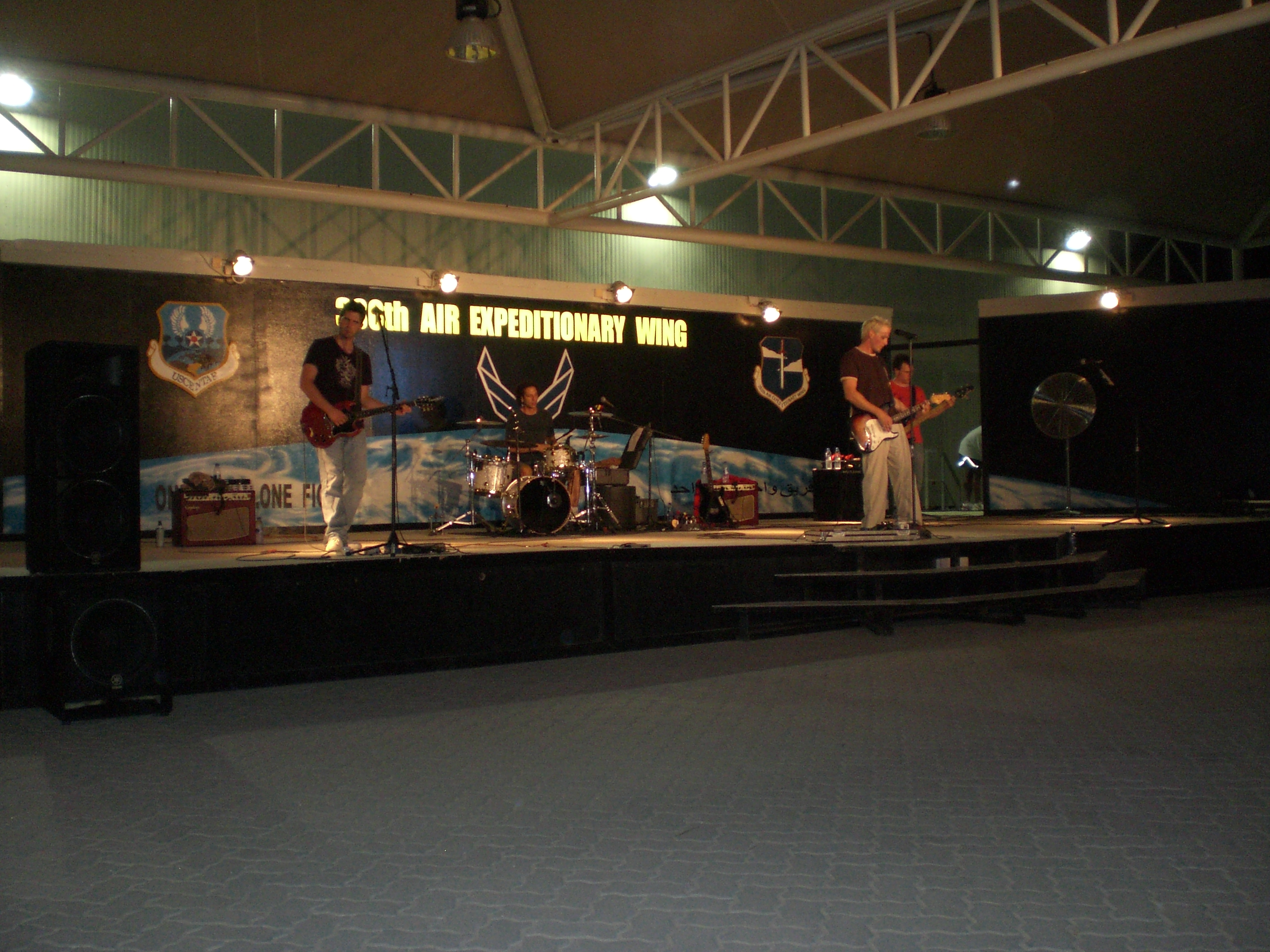
- Playing for USAF troops in SW Asia

Background information
- Origin: Atlanta, Georgia, United States
- Genres: Alternative rock, Hard rock
- Label: Hooptyville Records
- Members: Alan Schaefer; Alex Winfield; Rob Schaefer; Dan Fishman

Five Star Iris is an American alternative rock band formed in Atlanta, Georgia.

== History ==
In 1997, lead singer Alan Schaefer and his bass playing brother Robert put together the band Groundscore with drummer Dan Fishman. They became Another Man Down after coming out of CBGB's in New York one night and witnessing a drunk tumbling to the floor.

Another Man Down toured regionally, received some regional radio play with the holiday hit 'The Dreydl Song' and released three records. Some of the tracks on the third album (2001's 'Dangerous And Close') were produced by Ed Roland of Collective Soul.

Alan eventually met up with Dennis Matkosky and Dexter Green. Dexter was not producing anyone at the time, but he wanted to produce what became Five Star Iris. Once the band started recording their new music, they decided they needed a new name as well. The band decided on Highwire but soon discovered a band in Buffalo, New York had been using the name for some time. They eventually decided on Five Star Iris, a name suggested by Alan's wife.

The 2006 Five Star Iris album was co-produced with Sylvia Massy Shivy (Tool, Red Hot Chili Peppers) and Rich Veltrop (Tom Petty) with additional production by Dexter Green (Collective Soul). The album also includes a pair of songs Schaefer co-wrote with Collective Soul's Ed Roland; the band has also toured with Collective Soul.

After meeting with U.S. military representatives, the group embarked on a tour of military bases throughout the Middle East as part of the Armed Forces Entertainment program. Because the group was forbidden from selling physical albums on this tour, they saw a significant increase in the amount of traffic to their iTunes Store as a result.

== Tours ==
- Armed Forces Entertainment Tour (Jul 2004): Spain, Sicily and Italy
- Armed Forces Entertainment Tour (Sep 2004): Iceland, Sicily and Italy
- Armed Forces Entertainment Tour (Jun/Jul 2007): Iraq, Kuwait, Bahrain, UAE, Qatar, Djibouti

== Discography ==
- Five Star Iris EP (2003, Hooptyville Records)
- Five Star Iris (October 5, 2006, Hooptyville Records)
- Live Fools (December 4, 2007, Hooptyville Records)
- B-Sides the Point EP (2008, Hooptyville Records)

== Awards ==
- The song "Let It All Out" won the 2005 United Kingdom Songwriting Contest.
- The song "Is There Something I Can Do" was a semi-finalist in the 2005 International Songwriting Contest.
