= Wideawake (band) =

Wideawake is an American alternative rock band from Austin, Texas. Their songs have been heard on One Tree Hill (TV series), Dawson's Creek, Test Drive Unlimited 2 and The Ring. The band has shared the stage with bands and musicians including Switchfoot, Third Eye Blind, Vertical Horizon, Sister Hazel, Blue October, Sheryl Crow, Hootie and the Blowfish, Tears for Fears, and Gavin DeGraw.

The band relocated from Seattle, Washington to Austin, Texas in 2002 and received the Incubator Award from the Austin Music Foundation in 2003. The band dedicated all proceeds from sales of the song Maybe Tonight, Maybe Tomorrow to the Lance Armstrong Foundation on June 27, 2006. Scott Leger, the band's lead singer and songwriter, was awarded the Grand Prize in the 2006 International Songwriting Competition for the same song. The band also headlined The Rush! Energy Rock Bus national music tour along with the Zac Brown Band in the summer of 2006.

== Members ==
- Scott Leger – lead vocals
- Andy Dollerson – keys
- Chris Heerlein – bass guitar
- Steve Rude – bass guitar
- Matt Fletcher – drums
- Eddie Willis – lead guitar & vocals
- Nate Navarro – rhythm guitar & vocals

== Awards ==
- "Incubator Award" for Best Rock Band – Austin Music Foundation (2003)
- Best Electric Guitar (Eddie Willis) – Austin Music Awards (2003)
- Best Pop Band – Austin Music Awards (2003, 2004, 2005)
- Best Rock Band – Austin Music Awards (2004)
- Best Male Vocalist (Scott Leger) – Austin Music Awards (2003, 2004)
- Best Songwriter (Scott Leger) – Austin Music Awards (2003, 2004)
- Grand Prize Winner (Scott Leger, Maybe Tonight, Maybe Tomorrow) – International Songwriting Competition (2006)

== Discography ==
Studio albums

- Thread (1999)
- All Of My Days EP (2001)
- Bigger Than Ourselves (2002)
- Not So Far Away (April 26, 2005)
- Something That We Can't Let Go (January 20, 2009)

== See also ==
- Music of Austin
