= Simplified (band) =

American rock band

- Origin: Charlotte, North Carolina, U.S.
- Genres: Rock, reggae fusion, roots rock
- Years active: 2002–present
- Label: Smile High Entertainment
- Members: Chris Sheridan; Clee Laster
- Website: www.simplifiedmusic.com

Simplified is a North American rock, island vibe, and reggae rock band based in Charlotte, North Carolina.

== History ==
Chris Sheridan and Clee Laster met at local pub while Sheridan was bartending and Laster was performing as a solo artist at the Charlotte, North Carolina Uptown venue formerly known as The Graduate. The two formed an acoustic duo and began performing concerts known as Simplified in and around the city in 2002. In 2004, Sheridan and Clee auditioned band members, adding a bassist and drummer creating a quartet. Simplified began touring regionally in the Southeast United States in 2005. The band toured the United States nationally and performing shows internationally in North and occasionally in Central America. According to PANDORA Radio statistics, Simplified is rated one of the highest-level independent artists in the world with the 2006 song from the Smile album "Wake 'n Bake". With the release of Elephant Sky in 2008, Simplified went to more of a pop style. Between 2010 and 2013, Sheridan and Laster reinvented Simplified, bringing back the island rock sound they are known for, and also hired a variety of musicians to accompany them on the road and in the studio. Their song "Gettin' Home" was featured on the soundtrack of NASCAR The Game: Inside Line, and five years later with new developers, NASCAR Heat 2. In summer 2014, the band released their fourth studio album #WAKENBAKENATION which includes a recut studio version of the single "Wake N Bake" featuring an added horn section and a new gospel-style intro. In 2019, their 2011 song "Long Time Ago" was featured in NASCAR Heat 4.

== Members ==
Founding members

- Clee Laster (lead vocals, rhythm guitar; 2002–present)
- Chris Sheridan (lead guitar, backing vocals; 2002–present)

== Discography ==
Studio albums

- ACT 1 (2005)
- Smile (2006)
- Elephant Sky (2008)
- Brighter Days (2011)
- #WakeNBakeNation (2014)

== Sources ==
- Wildsmith, Steve, "Simplified puts it's [sic] name to work for its rock 'n' roll" The Daily Times, March 30, 2011, accessed April 25, 2011.
- Devores, Courtney (April 15, 2011). "Local Flavor: A Hometown Act Worth Watching". The Charlotte Observer.
- Hahne, Jeff "CD Review: Simplified's Brighter Days" "Creative Loafing", April 12, 2011, accessed April 25, 2011.
- Augustine, Dianna "Interview: Simplified" Shutter 16 Magazine, September 11, 2009, accessed April 25, 2011.
- Wake, Matt "Clee Speaks" "Metromix", November 25, 2008, accessed April 25, 2011.
- Hahne, Jeff, "Keeping it Simplified", Creative Loafing, November 4, 2008, accessed April 25, 2011.
- Schlehuber, Ryan, "Chris Sheridan returns home to St. Ignace with North Carolina rock band", The St. Ignace News, August 24, 2006, accessed April 25, 2011.
