= UBD FM =

- Brunei
- Frequencies: Desktop/Laptop

Programming
- Languages: English, Malay, Bruneian Malay
- Format: Variety - Music & Speech (Speech: news/arts/social issues)

Ownership
- Owner: Universiti Brunei Darussalam

History
- First air date: February 2009

Links
- Website: UBDFM Facebook

UBD FM is the first and only student-based radio station in Brunei Darussalam. Currently, the station broadcasts online, from a studio located at University Technology Hub, Universiti Brunei Darussalam.

== History ==
UBDFM was founded by the 2008/2009 UBD Student Representative Council, Khalil Kashfi in 2009. His idea was brought into discussion with the former Head of Educational Technology Centre (ETC), Dr Hanapi Mohammad. The proposal was then approved and in August 2009, it was when the journey of UBD fm begun- the first university based radio station, though the broadcasting was limited via streaming only.

The establishment of UBD FM is aligned with the university's plan in strengthening staff and student participation in university affairs. With a strong support and recognition from every group in the university community, UBD FM functions to ensure a more private campus aligned with the GenNext objectives of UBD. UBD FM provides an educational, entertainment and informational platform that address the needs and concerns of the immediate student population, which develops an appreciation of arts and humanities.

== Location ==
Under the advisory of ETC, UBDFM was located at the ETC studio building since 2009 until 2011. The studio is rather small which could only occupy around less than 10 people inside. Compared to the lounge area, it is large enough to be a living room that can fit in around 30 people. The lounge is both a place of work and study therefore creating a comfortable environment for the students.

Universiti Brunei Darussalam have been undergoing changes on its academic system and buildings in order to provide a better studying experience. In 2011, the ETC department moved to the new IBM building next to the Institute of Medicine building. However UBDFM studio is centered at the Core located next to the new Residential College apartment. The new broadcasting studio is a large glass-walled room that can occupy a roomful of people. It has made a comfortable environment compared to the old studio. The glass-walled room also allows visitor to see how UBDFM DJs go on-air live. On the other hand, the new lounge is small enough to fit around 15 people. Now UBDFM is located at Level 4, University Technology Hub.

== Services ==
UBD FM has been known to provide airplay and promotional exposure to emerging talents and new bands both inside and outside of Brunei Darussalam. Contributing to the local music industry, UBD FM plays records and musical demos of the registered students of the University itself.

The members are also active in providing services such as emcees for both UBD functions and other public events.

UBD FM is an online radio station operated entirely by students in Brunei Darussalam. The station has expanded its audience and programming while developing a presence on social media platforms.

== Audition ==
The very first deejay audition and crew recruitment was held on 18 March 2009 at Educational Technology Centre, UBD. Only UBD students are allowed to participate the online radio group. Candidates were interviewed in front of renowned deejays in Brunei, DJ Alif from Pelangi, DJ Alan from Pilihan, DJ Sean from Pilihan, DJ Ayu from Kristal and Badariah, a representative from the tutors in UBD.

Nowadays interviews are held by the seniors of UBDFM deejays and crew every new semester.

== Current broadcasts ==
UBD FM currently broadcasts continuously, with an automated broadcast system filling the intervals between live broadcasts. The station's output is live between the hours of 8am and 11pm. Programmes are produced and presented by undergraduate students of Universiti Brunei Darussalam.

The University has plans of broadcasting UBD FM around the country, for full power FM transmission in due time.
