= Tyrone Wells =

American singer-songwriter

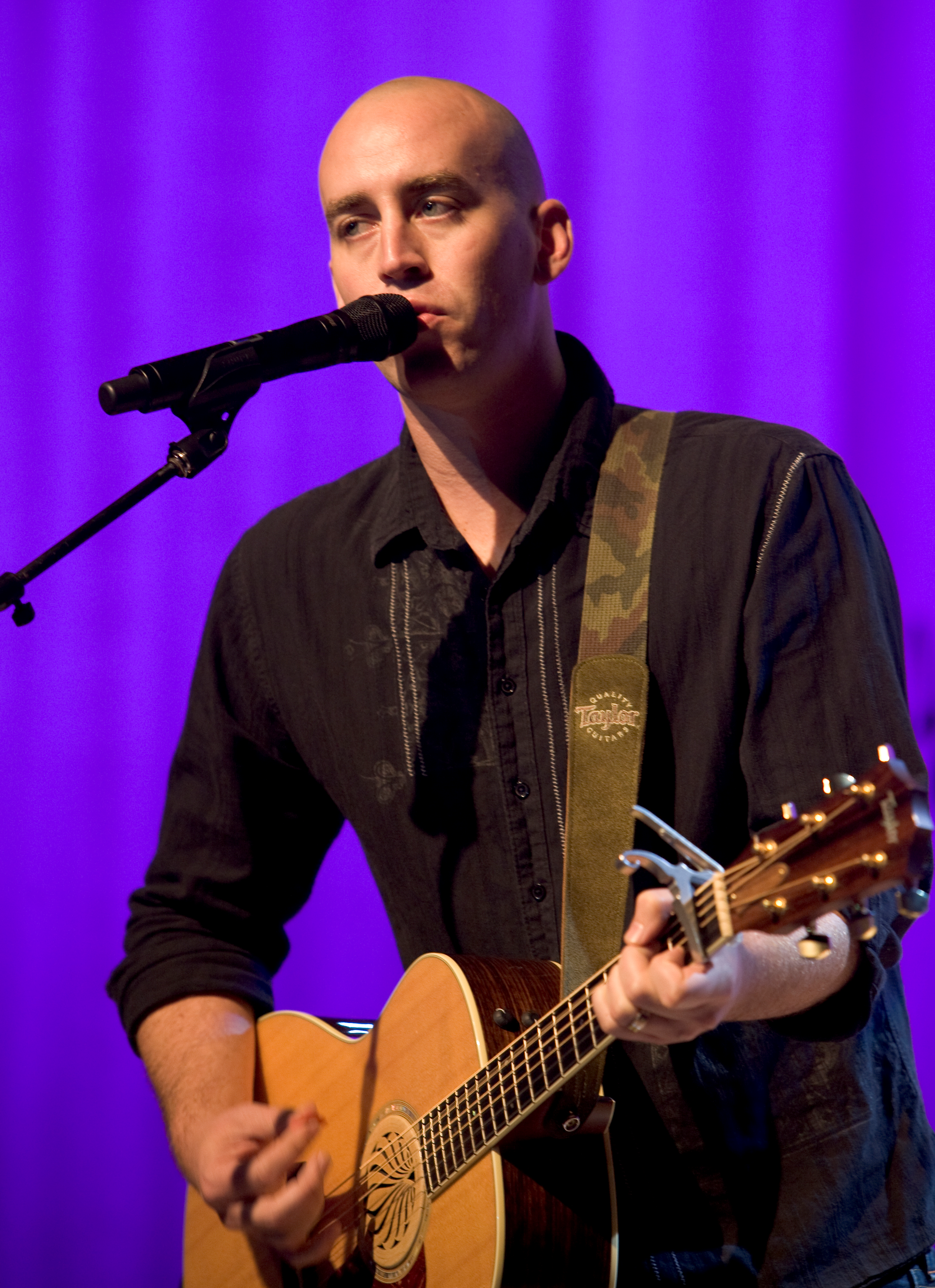

Background information
- Born: Tyrone Wells
- Origin: Spokane, Washington, United States
- Genres: Folk pop
- Occupations: Singer-songwriter, author
- Years active: 2000–present
- Labels: Position Music
- Website: tyronewells.com

Tyrone Wells is an American singer-songwriter from Spokane, Washington. He is the lead vocalist of the duo Oh the Larceny, with Dustin Burnett as the producer. He is also the lead vocalist for the bands WAR*HALL and Royal Deluxe.

== Career ==
Wells was born in Seattle and raised in Spokane, Washington. He has said in interviews that he was inspired by his older sisters who "brought out the music in me" but did not begin songwriting until his move to California. While attending Hope International University in Southern California, Wells joined the band Sinai in 1994 turning out two LPs on Say-Sos Records before signing with Word Records and renaming the band Skypark for their 1998 Dove Award-nominated album Am I Pretty?.

In 2000, Wells launched his solo career, playing acoustic shows in Orange County, California. In 2006, Wells signed a recording contract with Universal Records. They re-released his independent album Hold On on the internet in 2006, and released it in stores on February 6, 2007. On Hold On, Wells worked with producers Chris Karn and Marc Ford.

Wells released his solo album Remain on January 27, 2009. The first single from Remain, "More", reached No. 13 on the Triple A radio charts. The second single "Sink or Swim" was used in promos for the season 6 premiere of Grey's Anatomy.

In September 2010, Wells's song "Time of Our Lives" was used in the series finale promo for American daytime soap opera, As the World Turns, as well as The Vampire Diaries episode, "Memory Lane" (season 2, episode 4).

=== Remain album ===
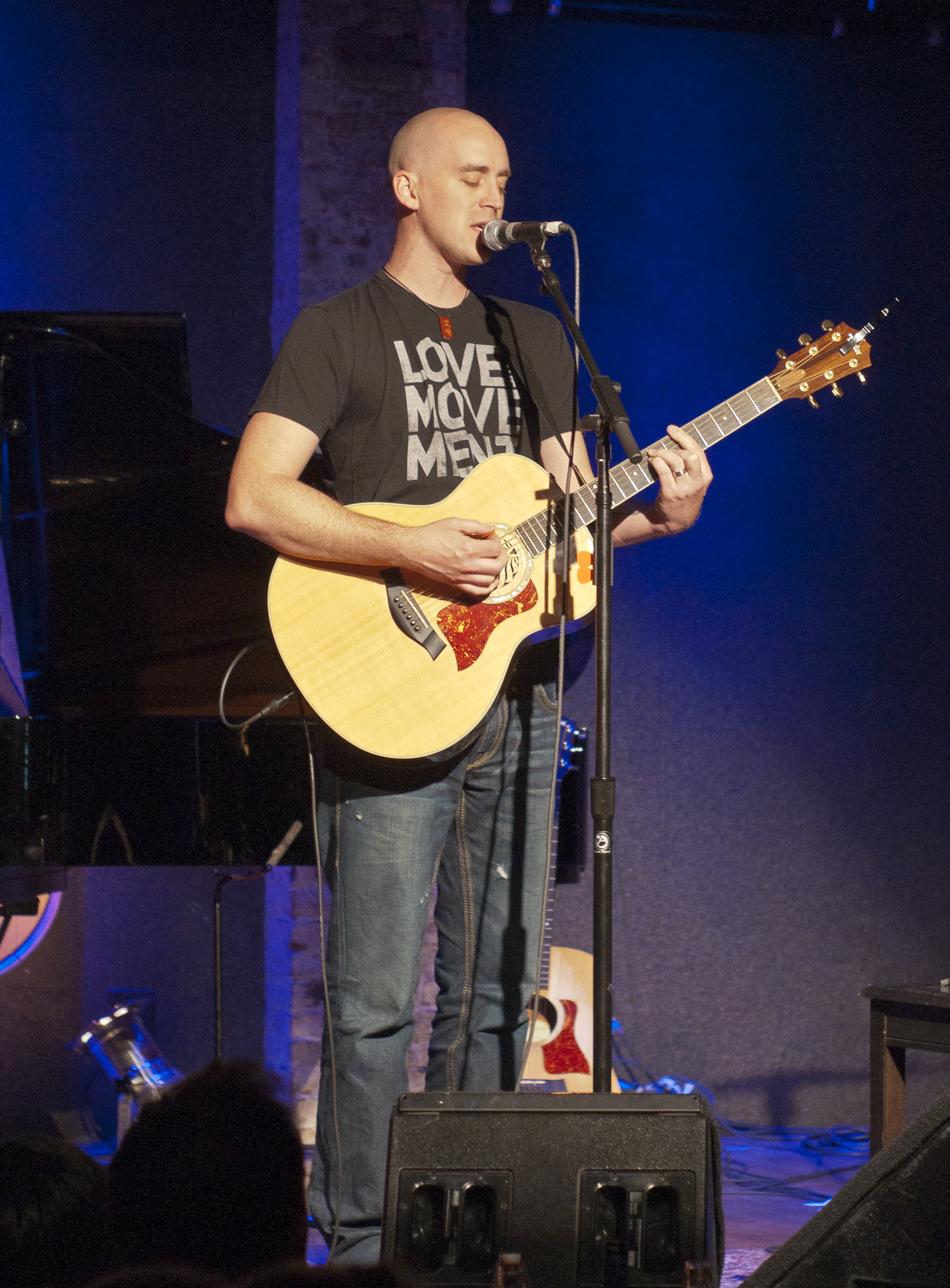
Tyrone Wells playing at the City Winery in NYC on Apr 28, 2011

Wells traveled to London to work on Remain. "Half of the album was done in London and the other half completed in the States," says Wells. "I didn't know what kind of record I was going to make before I got to London, but something just seemed to click while I was there that really defined what I wanted to do with this album."

Wells worked with songwriter and producer Martin Terefe (Jason Mraz, KT Tunstall, James Morrison) and Iain Archer (UK indie artist and Snow Patrol co-writer) in the UK, and Tim Myers (formerly of OneRepublic), David Hodges (formerly of Evanescence) and Matt Scannell (Vertical Horizon) in the U.S. The song "Losing Ground", one of a handful of production/songwriting collaborations between Wells and Terefe, was written and demoed in less than 3 hours during their first writing session together.

=== Metal and Wood EP ===
The 2010 independently released EP, Metal & Wood, saw Wells return to his acoustic, singer-songwriter roots. The album spent nearly three weeks at No. 1 on the iTunes Singer-Songwriter album chart, with the track "Running Around in My Dreams" topping the song chart.

=== Where We Meet album ===
Released on March 3, 2012, Where We Meet, ushered in a new beginning for Wells. His fourth full-length album and first since leaving a major label, Where We Meet embraced both sides of Wells' acoustic vulnerability and pop rock irresistibility. The album's first single, "Freedom", spawned a music video and was used in trailers for Disney's The Odd Life of Timothy Green.

Where We Meet debuted at No. 1 on the iTunes Singer-Songwriter album chart, reached the top ten of iTunes overall and No. 3 on the Billboard Top Heatseekers chart.

=== This Love album ===
The recording of This Love found Tyrone Wells in the studio on and off throughout most of 2012. Tyrone teamed up again with producer Michael "Smidi" Smith. Smidi produced nearly half of Tyrone's sophomore major label release (Universal Republic), Remain, as well as being responsible for 7 of the 8 songs on Tyrone's acoustic EP Metal & Wood.

About This Love, Tyrone says, "I did my best to make a mostly acoustic record. I always find myself listening to acoustic music, so I did my best to build the record around the acoustic guitar and make an organic sounding CD that I would enjoy listening to. Smidi was the perfect choice to produce this record. Smidi does a fantastic job of not getting in the way and helping really serve each song."

This Love debuted at No. 2 on the iTunes Singer-Songwriter album chart and reached No. 19 on the Billboard Heatseakers chart.

== Personal life ==
Tyrone and his wife Elina have three daughters named Aria Lian, Ireland Mele, and Taya Aika Neal Wells. A video of him singing to Aria went viral in 2014.

Tyrone and Elina also have an album together.

== Discography ==
=== Studio albums ===
- Tyrone Wells (2001, True American Records)
- Snapshot (2003, True American Records)
- Close: Live at McClain's (2005) Position Music/True American Records)
- Hold On (2006, Position Music/True American Records)
- Remain (2009, Universal Records U.S.) No. 17 Billboard Top Heatseekers
- Metal and Wood (2010, Position Music)
- Where We Meet (2012, Position Music)
- This Love (2012, Position Music)
- Beautiful World EP (2012, Position Music)
- The Christmas Album (2013, Position Music)
- Roll with It (2015)
- Days I Will Remember (2018)
- “Lift Me Up” (2019, Position Music)
- “The Hits Acoustic” (2019 Position Music)
- “Somebody to You” (2022 Position Music)
- “Holiday Wish Come True” (2022 Position Music)
- “If Life Were a Song” (2024 Position Music)
- “Shape of Your Heart (2025 Position Music)

=== Singles ===
- "Let It Snow, Let It Snow, Let It Snow" (2006, Universal Records)
- "What Are We Fighting For?" (2007, Universal Records)
- "Patience" (2008, Universal Records)
- "More" (2009, Universal Records)
- "Freedom" (2012, Position Music)
- "Rise Again" (2018)
