= Bain Mattox =

Bain Mattox and Shot From Guns
- Origin: Athens, Georgia, United States
- Genres: Folk; Indie rock
- Years active: 2002–present
- Label: SWIM Recordings
- Members: Bain Mattox; Christopher Skogen; Michael Lamond; Chris Wilkes (drummer)|Chris Wilkes
- Past members: Jeff Rieter; Andy Bauer; Count Kellam
- Website: Official website

Bain Mattox is a multi-instrumentalist and vocalist, based out of Athens, Georgia. Having self-released albums in the past with a backing band simply under the name 'Bain Mattox', his band now goes by name Bain Mattox and Shot From Guns. A self-managed recording artist, Bain Mattox has released four albums since 2002 through SWIM Recordings and athensmusic.net.

His music merges the genres of folk and rock, often accenting traditional rock music with instruments such as a mandolin and accordion. The first studio album, Technicolor Episode was recorded and released in 2002 with the help of Don McCollister, a producer who has worked with Sister Hazel, Shawn Mullins, and Indigo Girls. After touring to promote this album, a self-titled album was recorded and released under SWIM Recordings. Since then, the backing band lineup has changed and two new recordings have been released through SWIM, Prizefighter and Bird in the Hand.

The band consists Bain Mattox himself, who plays guitar, accordion, banjo, mandolin, as well as providing vocals, guitarist Christopher Skogen, bassist Michael Lamond and drummer Chris Wilkes. Previous members (prior to Bain Mattox and Shot From Guns) have included Andy Bauer, Jeff Rieter, and Count Kellam.

According to Alternative Addiction, Bain Mattox is "hands down, the most talented unsigned artist in the country."

In 2010, he released The Darc Demos on iTunes. This record had no promotion except for a single Facebook status, after which it was not discussed publicly again.

He lives in Athens, Georgia with his family. He and his wife, fellow musician Amanda Kapousouz, have two children. Mattox also owns two businesses in Athens: Normal Bar and Automatic Pizza. Bain has since begun scheduling shows in Athens and neighboring cities such as Charlotte.

== Discography ==
=== Albums ===
- Technicolor Episode (2002)
- Bain Mattox (2003)
- Prizefighter (2005)
- Bird in the Hand (2007)
- The Darc Demos (2010) (digital release)
