= Stephen Kellogg =

American musician (born 1976)

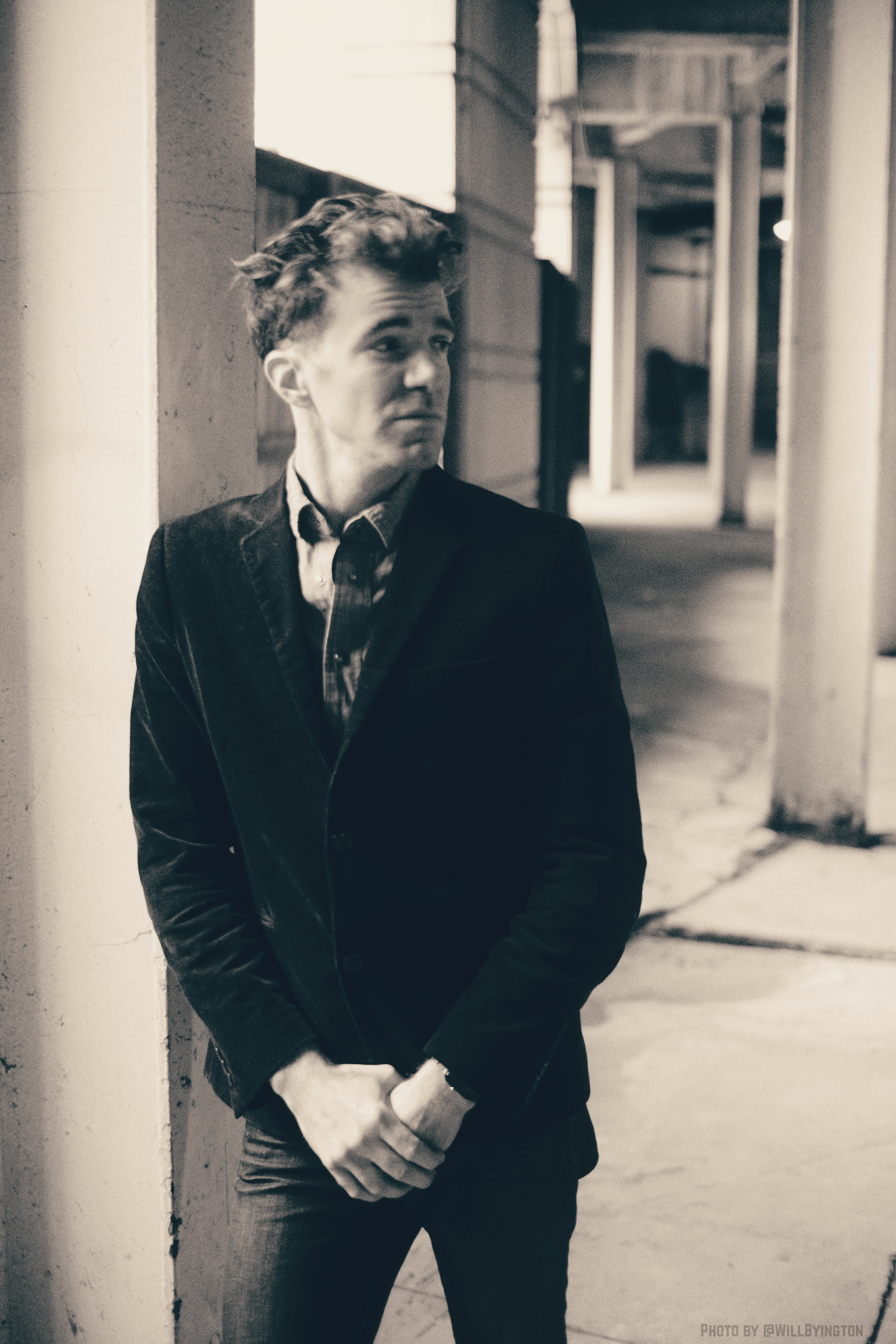
- Kellogg in 2015

Background information
- Also known as: Skunk
- Born: November 28, 1976 (age 49); West Chester, Pennsylvania, U.S.
- Origin: Massachusetts, United States
- Genres: Americana, folk-rock
- Occupation: Singer-songwriter
- Years active: 1994–present
- Labels: Vanguard, Universal Records, Everfine Records, Bread and Butter Music
- Website: www.stephenkellogg.com

Stephen Richard Kellogg (born November 28, 1976) is an American singer-songwriter and founder and former frontman of Stephen Kellogg and the Sixers.

== Career ==
Kellogg founded his band Stephen Kellogg and the Sixers in 2003. The band has been on hiatus since 2012. Kellogg has consistently toured since then, billed simply as “Stephen Kellogg." Past members of the Sixers have joined him on stage occasionally.

In 2013, Kellogg gave a TEDx talk about job satisfaction. Its YouTube video has gained over 200,000 views.

On February 12, 2016, Kellogg released the album South, West, North, East. The premise of the album was to record each section in a different region of the USA, with different co-producers and groups of musicians.

On March 23, 2018, Kellogg performed at O.A.R.'s Concert for Dreams at The Beacon Theatre in New York City.

Kellogg released the album Objects In The Mirror on November 23, 2018.

== Charity work ==
Each year during Christmas, Kellogg donates handwritten lyrics to raise money for St Jude's Children's Hospital and other charities. In 2015, Kellogg was part of the Bedstock lineup, the world’s first in-bed music festival, to raise awareness and funds for MyMusicRx, a program of the Children’s Cancer Association.

== Performing for the Troops ==
Kellogg habitually visits military bases to perform musical numbers for service men and women serving both domestically and overseas. The Sixers toured with Armed Forces Entertainment in 2009 and 2010 to bring “home” to the troops in places like Kuwait, Israel, Bahrain and Ramstein Hospital in Germany. In 2010, Kellogg & the Sixers were named the "Armed Forces Entertainer of the Year".

During the summer of 2014, they traveled to Africa and again, to the Middle East to play for troops.

== Personal life ==
Kellogg grew up in southern Connecticut. In 1997, he began his musical career in Northampton, Massachusetts while interning for a local club. A few years later, he married his high school sweetheart and began a well-publicized affection for his role as husband and later, father to their four daughters.

== Discography ==
- Invest in Us – 1994
- Rain Summer – The Stephen Kellogg Band – 1995
- Buffalo – Stephen Kellogg and the Root Cellar Band – 1997
- South of Stephen – 2000
- Muskrats, Mullets & Mesh Caps – 2001
- The Early Hits (1992–1997) – 2002
- Lucky 11 – 2002
- Bulletproof Heart – The Stephen and The Sixers – 2004
- Stephen Kellogg and the Sixers – The Stephen and The Sixers – 2005
- The First Waltz – The Stephen and The Sixers – 2006 – CD/DVD set
- Glassjaw Boxer – The Stephen and The Sixers – 2007
- The Bear – The Stephen and The Sixers – 2009
- Live from the Heart: 1000th Show, Irving Plaza, NYC – The Stephen and The Sixers – 2010
- Gift Horse – The Stephen and The Sixers – 2011
- Blunderstone Rookery – 2013
- South West North East – 2016
- Tour De Forty: Greatest Hits (So Far) Live – 2017
- Objects in the Mirror – 2018
- Keep It Up, Kid – 2022
- To You, Old Friend — 2025
