= Stephen Kellogg and the Sixers =

American rock band

- Also known as: SK6ERS
- Origin: Massachusetts; United States
- Genres: Americana, Folk-Rock, Country
- Years active: 2003– 2012
- Labels: Vanguard Records, Universal Records, Everfine Records
- Members: Stephen Kellogg; Kit Karlson; Brian Factor; Sam Getz; Chip Johnson
- Past members: Chris Soucy; Kyle Riabko
- Website: www.stephenkellogg.com

Stephen Kellogg and the Sixers were an American rock band formed in Western Massachusetts in 2003. The band features lead singer and founding member Stephen Kellogg (born November 28, 1976) piano and bass player Kit Karlson (born September 22, 1976), drummer Brian "Boots" Factor (born August 14, 1979), and electric guitar/pedal steel player Sam Getz (born October 17, 1983). Chip Johnson (born February 10, 1983) joined Stephen Kellogg and the Sixers on bass in 2011.

== General information ==
They have recorded albums for Universal Records, Everfine Records (a subsidiary of Atlantic Records) and Vanguard Records. Their album Glassjaw Boxer, recorded for Everfine Records, was named one of the top five albums of 2007 by USA Today critic Brian Mansfield.

Their release The Bear, Vanguard Records, was voted "Best of 2009" by No Depression and JamBase. Their single "Shady Esperanto & The Young Hearts" cracked the Billboard Top 20 for AAA. They were named 2009 Entertainers of the year by Armed Forces Entertainment.

Their song "Maria" was covered by Canadian country band Doc Walker and was a top 10 hit.

The band is also known for annual commitments to St. Jude Children's Hospital.

In 2009, the band recorded a music video of "Shady Esperanto & The Young Hearts" with the University of Massachusetts Minuteman Marching Band. Kit Karlson is a former member of said marching band.

=== Touring credits ===
Stephen Kellogg and the Sixers' on stage credits include tours with George Thorogood, Needtobreathe, Sugarland, Hanson, O.A.R., Josh Ritter, Dar Williams, David Crosby, Martin Sexton as well as an appearance with James Brown shortly before Brown's death. Noteworthy festival plays include 2006 Telluride BlueGrass Festival, 2008 Lyons Folk Festival, 2008 Mile High Festival, The 2007 All Good Festival and Multiple appearances on NPR's Mountain Stage featuring Larry Groce.

The band's touring history also includes several trips overseas to play for the United States Armed Forces. They spent one month in the spring of 2009 playing on bases in nine countries such as Kuwait and Bahrain as well as a trip to Israel to play for Israeli Prime Minister Benjamin Netanyahu.

=== Hiatus ===
After over twelve-hundred shows and nine years of playing together as a band 'Stephen Kellogg and the Sixers' went on hiatus at the end of November 2012. The band did a send off called "The Hi-Ate-US Tour" which consisted of a national tour of the country between October 17 and November 24. Their final show of that tour was at Webster Hall in New York City. They have no current plans for future tours. As of December 2012 Stephen Kellogg has been touring extensively, having released his first solo album, Blunderstone Rookery in 2013. His second album, South, West, North, East was released in February 2016 and a greatest hits album, Tour De Forty: Greatest Hits so Far (Live), followed in 2017. His most recent work, Objects in the Mirror, was released in 2018.

== Current band members ==
- Stephen "Skunk" Kellogg - lead vocals, acoustic guitar, electric guitar, harmonica, piano
- Kit "Goose" Karlson - bass guitar, keyboards (including keytar), accordion, tuba, backing vocals
- Brian "Boots" Factor - drums, backing vocals, mandolin, banjo
- Sam "Steamer" Getz - electric guitar, pedal steel guitar, bass, backing vocals
- Chip Johnson - bass guitar, acoustic guitar, electric guitar, backing vocals

=== Former band members ===
- Chris Soucy - electric guitar, bass, vocals (2004–2007)- Now is the regional director of School of Rock Denver
- Kyle Riabko - electric guitar, bass, vocals (2007–2008) - Left band to pursue solo musical and Broadway interests.

== Discography ==
=== Released with "The Sixers" ===
- Bulletproof Heart - 2004
- Stephen Kellogg and the Sixers - 2005
- The First Waltz - 2006 - CD/DVD set
- Glassjaw Boxer - 2007
- The Bear - 2009
- Live from the Heart: 1000th Show, Irving Plaza, NYC - 2010
- Gift Horse - 2011

=== Stephen Kellogg solo releases ===
Stephen Kellogg

- Invest in Us - 1994
- Rain Summer - The Stephen Kellogg Band - 1995
- Buffalo - Stephen Kellogg and the Root Cellar Band - 1997
- South of Stephen - 2000
- Muskrats, Mullets & Mesh Caps - 2001
- The Early Hits (1992-1997) - 2002
- Lucky 11 - 2002
- Blunderstone Rookery - 2013
- South West North East - 2016
- Tour De Forty: Greatest Hits (So Far) Live - 2017
- Objects In The Mirror - 2018

=== Other releases ===
Brian Factor

- "January Bridges" - 2006
- "Dead Language Demos" - 2007
- "Part or Execution" - 2010

Trevor Jackson

- Kyle Riabko and Boots Factor Are...- Trevor Jackson - 2008

Sam Getz

- The Vig- "Around and Around and So On"- 2010
- Welshley Arms- "Welcome" - 2013

Chip Johnson

- This Winter Room- "Losing the Paper Moon" - 2011

== Featured on ==
- The Letterbox EP - Heath Brandon - 2006 (Kit Karlson - bass) * Time for Good - Todd Martin - 2005 (Kit Karlson - Bass, Factor -Percussion, Stephen Kellogg - Harmonica & Vocals) * "Smoke"- Stepanian -2005 (Stephen Kellogg - Vocals) * "Mont Clare" - Todd Martin - 2007 (Kit Karlson - Bass, Factor - Percussion)

== Songs appeared in ==
- One Tree Hill - October 2008 - Song: "Hearts in Pain"
- One Tree Hill - 2009 - Song: "Born in the Spring"
- Mercy - 2009 - Song: "Shady Esperanto and the Young Hearts"
- Men of a Certain Age - Fall 2010 promotional advertisement - Song: "Shady Esperanto and the Young Hearts"
