= Hotel Carolina =

Defunct music festival in South Carolina

Hotel Carolina Logo

Hotel Carolina was an annual singer-songwriter music festival which began as a single annual event, held in Isle of Palms, South Carolina. The Hotel Carolina roster has since expanded to also include events in Philadelphia and St. Pete Beach, FL. Featuring an array of touring singer-songwriters on the scene today, Hotel Carolina was conceived to provide an opportunity for fans to see a number of nationally-touring singer-songwriters on one concert stage during a multi-day event.

A past participant at a number of Hotel Carolina events, Tony Lucca likened it to "playing in the coolest sandbox ever", and explained: "To be able to hang with so many of my friends, musical companions, tour mates, fans, and new listeners in such an intimate, yet festive, setting makes me burst at the seams." Ernie Halter, who also performed several years, called it "summer camp for big kids. ...I get to hang out at the beach and make music with all my friends, old and new". To further describe Hotel Carolina, Lucca said: "[It's] definitely a 'who's who' of indie singer-songwriters, as well as a 'who's who' of loyal supporters and music lovers."

As of January 2014, the Hotel Carolina Festival is on hiatus.

== Hotel Carolina 2013 ==
In 2013, Hotel Carolina is again expanding its events to include a third event.

=== Hotel Carolina St. Pete Beach 2013 ===
Hotel Carolina is expanding its event roster to incorporate a third event location in 2013 scheduled to occur at the Postcard Inn in St. Pete Beach, FL. The dates of the event were February 1 and 2. The performers confirmed to participate include: Brendan James, Matt Duke, Griffin House, Michael Tolcher, Ari Hest, Garrison Starr, Sarah Miles, Bracher Brown, Ken Yates, and Jacob Jeffries.

=== Hotel Carolina Philadelphia 2013 ===
Hotel Carolina Philadelphia 2013 is scheduled to take place May 3 and 4, although a venue is still to be set.

=== Hotel Carolina IOP 2013 ===
Hotel Carolina IOP 2013 is scheduled to take place at the Windjammer, Isle of Palms, SC, on September 19, 20 and 21, 2013.

== Hotel Carolina 2012 ==
In 2012, Hotel Carolina expanded to include two separate events.

=== Hotel Carolina Philadelphia 2012 ===
For the first time, Hotel Carolina hosted a Philadelphia, PA-based event at the Grape Room on January 27 and 28. With two stages and staggered set times, fans were able to enjoy non-stop performances from artists such Tony Lucca, John Cusimano and James Rotondi of The Cringe, Say Chance, Keaton Simons, Todd Carey, Shaun Hague, Cara Salimando, Andrea Nardello, Jerad Finck, Caleb Hawley, Delta Rae, Sarah Miles, and Jared McCloud. Also performing were Ingram Hill and Matt Duke. On Saturday afternoon, activities for the fans and performers to hang out and compete together also took place.

=== Hotel Carolina IOP 2012 ===
The fourth annual flagship event took place September 20, 21 and 22 at the Windjammer, Isle of Palms, SC. Fans were able to enjoy three nights of shows, afternoon acoustic performances a jam session, and "Camp Carolina" events (at which fans could interact and compete with the performers) throughout the weekend. The event was headlined by Tony Lucca. Other performers included: Bracher Brown, Todd Carey, Matt Duke, Riley Etheridge Jr., Jerad Finck, Sam Grow, Ernie Halter, Caleb Hawley, Brendan James, Jared McCloud, Sarah Miles, John Milstead, Andrea Nardello, Curtis Peoples, Ken Yates, Honor By August, and Ingram Hill.

== Hotel Carolina 2011 ==
The 2011 Hotel Carolina event was expanded to three days and was held September 22, September 23 and 24. The line-up included Ingram Hill, Curtis Peoples, Josh Hoge, Jerad Finck, Jared McCloud, Benny Marchant, Maggie McClure, Shane Henry, Nina Storey, Keaton Simons, TFDI, Matt Hires, Pawnshop Kings, Todd Carey, Rachel Platten, and Ernie Halter. As in past years, the weekend included "Camp Carolina," a series of activities at which fans and artists could participate together and compete against each other.

== Hotel Carolina 2010 ==
The 2010 Hotel Carolina event was held August 27 and 28. Friday night's list of performers included Todd Carey, The Bridges, Curtis Peoples, Joe Firstman, Josh Hoge, Sequoyah Prep School, and Tony Lucca. Saturday night's list of performers included Jim Bianco, Jay Nash, Sun Domingo, Matt Duke, Keaton Simons, Benjy Davis Project, and Ernie Halter. In addition to the concert, Saturday's events included an afternoon jam session (hosted by Roy Jay), and participation in "Camp Carolina," a series of activities (flip-cup tournament, beach volleyball, etc.) where fans had the opportunity to compete with and alongside the artists.

== Hotel Carolina 2009 ==
The 2009 Hotel Carolina event was held September 25 and 26. Friday night's list of performers included Drew Copeland (of Sister Hazel), Sara Kelley, Keaton Simons, Andrew Hoover, Josh Hoge, Curtis Peoples, and Ernie Halter. Saturday night's list of performers included Matt Duke, Jay Nash, Sarah Haze, Gareth Asher, Tony Lucca, Benjy Davis Project, and Tyrone Wells. Saturday's itinerary also incorporated an all-star afternoon jam which included all Hotel Carolina artists with additional special guests JT Spangler, Chardy McEwan (of Pat McGee Band), and Roy Jay. Local artists and musically-inclined fans were also encouraged to join the jam session.
