= Pat Robinson =

Pat Robinson may refer to:

- Patricia Murphy Robinson (active in 1960s and 1970s), also known as Pat, African-American feminist
- Pat Robinson, character in 1975 American film The Adventures of the Wilderness Family
- Pat Robinson, musician on 2002 album More Than Local

== See also ==
- Patricia Robinson (1931–2009), Trinidadian economist
- Patricia Allan (née Robinson; born 1938), New Zealand vicar and advocate for survivors of sexual abuse
- Patrick Robinson (disambiguation)
- Pat Robertson (1930–2023), televangelist from the United States
