= Orrantia =

Orrantia is a Spanish surname. Notable people with the surname include:

- Carlos Orrantia (born 1991), Mexican footballer
- Hayley Orrantia (born 1994), American actress and singer-songwriter
