= Under that Christmas Spell =

Studio album by Tim Halperin
- Released: November 2012
- Genre: singer-songwriter
- Label: 24 Hour Distribution

Tim Halperin chronology
Rise and Fall (2011)	Under that Christmas Spell (2012)	Heart Tells Your Head (2014)

Under that Christmas Spell is the third EP by American singer-songwriter Tim Halperin, released in November 2012. Beyond the original title track, songs include older covers such as "Maybe This Christmas."

== Production ==
Halperin has stated he was inspired to make the EP while made nostalgic by a red Starbucks cup in the middle of a Texas summer. According to Halperin, "Growing up, I worked on a Christmas tree farm for four years. Around Christmas, people in general are more happy and forgiving."

== Release ==
In November 2012 Tim Halperin released the EP Under that Christmas Spell, which includes five arrangements of classic songs and the eponymous single written by Halperin. The album's final cover, "I'll Be Home for Christmas," features Hayley Orrantia on vocals.

== Reception ==
According to a review, "Under That Christmas Spell is a six-song album that intermixes original tunes and classic covers. Halperin reinvented the hymn-like 'Mary Did You Know' by adding cello and redirecting the listener to the lyricism of the song. In his rendition of 'Have Yourself a Merry Little Christmas,' Halperin's sincerity bleeds through as his voice dances over minimalist guitar lines and dainty xylophone."

== Track listing ==
No.	Title	Writer(s)	{{{extra_column}}}	Length
1.	"Under That Christmas Spell"	Tim Halperin		3:37
2.	"I'll Be Home for Christmas" (with Hayley Orrantia)	Tim Halperin		3:42
3.	"Maybe This Christmas"	Jordan Critz / Tim Halperin / Ernie Halter	Featuring Hayley Orrantia	3:49
4.	"Mary, Did You Know?"	Tim Halperin		3:45
5.	"Miracle"	Jordan Critz / Tim Halperin		3:53
6.	"Have Yourself a Merry Little Christmas"	Tim Halperin		3:25
