= Lost Souls Like Us =

Studio album by Benjy Davis Project
- Released: March 2, 2010
- Recorded: 2010
- Genre: Southern Rock
- Length: 38:27
- Label: Rock Ridge Music
- Producer: Bobby Capps & Jason Spiewak

Benjy Davis Project chronology
Dust (2007/2008)	Lost Souls Like Us (2010)

Lost Souls Like Us is Benjy Davis Project's fourth studio album, released on March 2, 2010. It was recorded at Rivergate Studios in Hendersonville, TN. The album featured the current band line-up of Benjy Davis and Mic Capdevielle. In addition to Davis and Capdevielle, the album featured a cast of seasoned studio musicians: Mark "Sparky" Matejka of Lynyrd Skynyrd, Danny Chauncey of 38 Special and Jason "Slim" Gambill of Lady Antebellum all contributed guitar parts; Ethan Pilzer (Jewel, Big & Rich) played bass; Jason Spiewak and Bobby Capps played piano and organ; and Sara Jean Kelley sang background vocals.

== Track listing ==
All songs composed by Benjy Davis.

1. "Mississippi" - 3:46
2. "Get High" - 3:06
3. "Give It A Week's Time" - 2:40
4. "Stay With Me" - 3:16
5. "Send Your Love Down" - 2:56
6. "Slow Wind" - 2:55
7. "Check Your Pockets" - 4:10
8. "Bite My Tongue" - 3:08
9. "Iron Chair" - 2:59
10. "Aftermath" - 2:56
11. "Light Of Other Days" - 3:02
12. "You Just Know" - 3:33
13. "Sincerely" - 3:47 (Bonus Track, Amazon MP3 only)

== Personnel ==
- Benjy Davis - Acoustic Guitar, Lead Vocals
- Mic Capdevielle - Drums, Percussion

== Additional personnel ==
- Bobby Capps - Hammond B-3 Organ, Background Vocals
- Jason "Slim" Gambill - Mandolin, Electric Guitar
- Mark "Sparky" Matejka - Electric Guitar, Slide Guitar
- Ethan Pilzer - Bass Guitar
- Jason Spiewak - Piano, Hammond B-3 Organ, Background Vocals
- Sara Jean Kelley - Background Vocals
- Danny Chauncey - Guitar
