= Hayley Orrantia =

American actress and musician (born 1994)

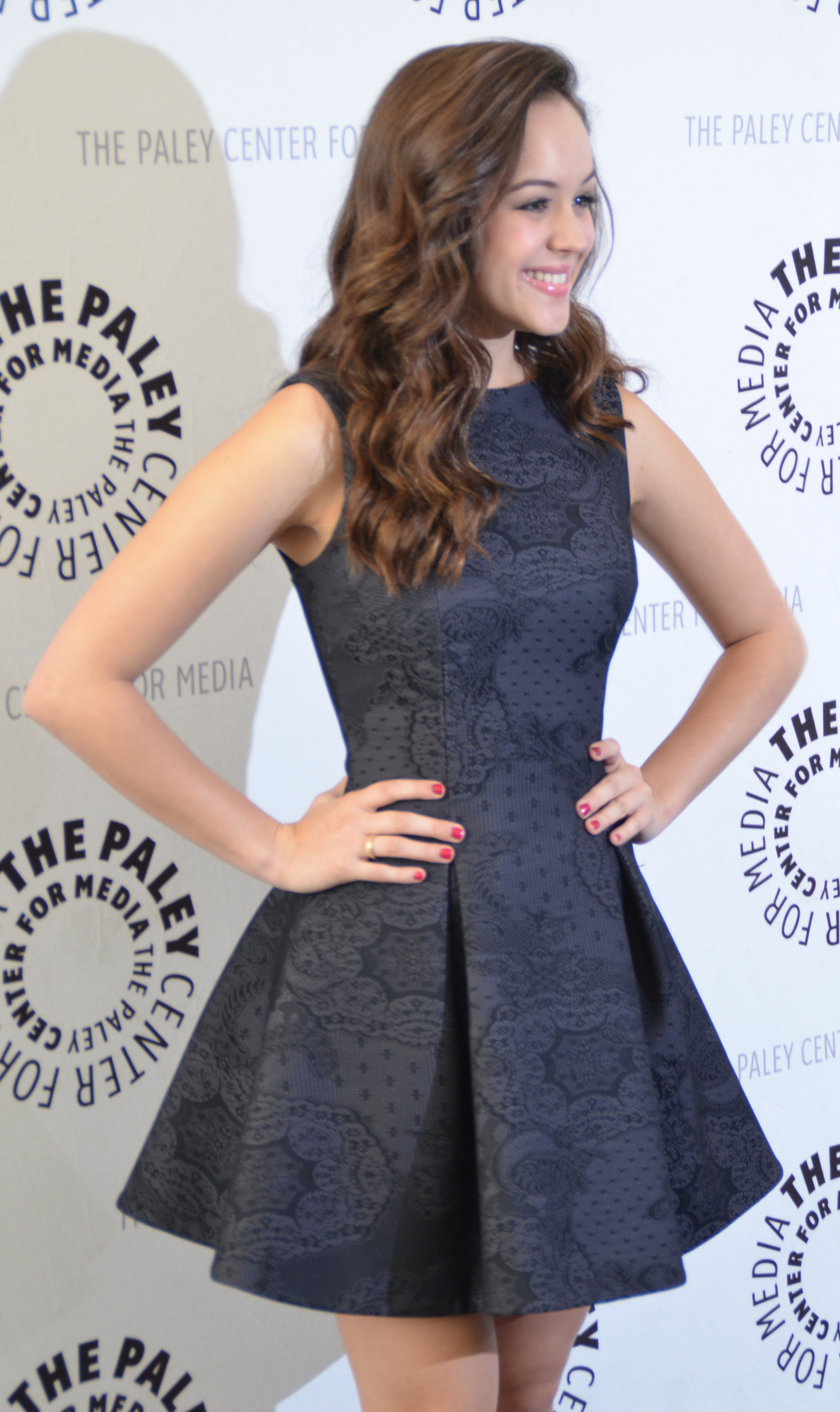
- Orrantia in April 2014

Background information
- Born: Sarah Hayley Orrantia; February 21, 1994 (age 32); Tarrant County, Texas, U.S.
- Genres: Country; pop
- Occupations: Actress; singer; songwriter
- Years active: 2009–present
- Spouse: Greg Furman (m. 2023)

Sarah Hayley Orrantia (born February 21, 1994) is an American actress, singer, and songwriter. She is best known for portraying Erica Goldberg on the ABC comedy series The Goldbergs (2013–2023). She had previously been a member of Lakoda Rayne, a girl group assembled by Paula Abdul during the first season of The X Factor. She released her debut single "Love Sick" in 2015 and her debut EP The Way Out in 2019.

== Early life ==
Sarah Hayley Orrantia was born in Tarrant County, Texas, on February 21, 1994. She grew up in nearby Grand Prairie and Highland Village. She is of Spaniard descent as well as English, French and Irish. Her surname 'Orrantia' means "mountain pass" in Basque (it is historically rooted in the Basque Country, specifically Biscay, in northern Spain) and comes from her paternal great-grandparents, who were from Chihuahua. She attended public school from elementary to middle school in Highland Village, then attended Marcus High School in nearby Flower Mound until her junior year, when she decided to start home-schooling to pursue training as a musician and actress. She has said that she got her first acting experience when she joined her high school's musical theater program.

== Career ==
Orrantia began singing at the age of nine and started professionally training at 12. She wrote her first song at 13. By 15, she had recorded her first EP of cover songs and began writing with songwriter Jamie Houston (best known for writing songs for the High School Musical film franchise). She recorded the vocals to Houston's "Magic of a Friend" which was on Disney's Tinker Bell and the Lost Treasure soundtrack in 2009. She sang background vocals for Demi Lovato on Disney's Camp Rock 2: The Final Jam soundtrack and Miley Cyrus on Disney's Hannah Montana Forever soundtrack in 2010.

Orrantia's first acting role was at 17, in a commercial for Sprint in 2011. She was cast in the independent film Cooper and the Castle Hills Gang, which premiered at the Dallas International Film Festival. In the summer of 2011, she auditioned for the first season of The X Factor and was selected from a YouTube video submission, receiving four "yes" votes from the judges during the live audition phase in Seattle. Although she originally auditioned as a solo artist, she and three other female singers were put into a group for the rest of the auditions as girl group Lakoda Rayne. They were eliminated during the fifth week in the live shows.

From 2013 until 2023, Orrantia played Erica Goldberg on the ABC comedy series The Goldbergs. After casting her and learning of her musical talent, series creator Adam F. Goldberg wrote several episodes where Erica sings and plays guitar. Series co-star AJ Michalka is also a recording artist, and the two sang together on three of the tracks of The Goldbergs MixTape, released in 2017.

Orrantia had a leading role in the Christian drama film God's Not Dead 2 in 2016, which was a commercial success but received overwhelmingly negative reviews. She also released a single called "Strong, Sweet and Southern". In 2019, she released her debut EP The Way Out. It has been described as a "very intimate and personal look at [her] own life" and is inspired by the process she went through after an ex-boyfriend stole almost $9,000 from her.

In 2022, Orrantia competed in season seven of The Masked Singer as "Ringmaster" of Team Good. She made a reference to having known Nicole Scherzinger from The X-Factor when she was made a member of Lakoda Rayne. Orrantia finished in second place, making her the youngest runner-up in the show's history at 28 years old.

== Charity work ==
Orrantia wrote the song "Who I Am" for the National Eating Disorders Association and the song "Power of a Girl" for the Girl Scouts of the USA. She also supports the cancer charities Lungevity, Susan G. Komen, and Stand Up to Cancer. Since 2007, she has served as an ambassador for the Texas Music Project, which raises awareness and funds for music education in public schools.

== Personal life ==
Orrantia began dating actor Greg Furman in 2019, after they were introduced to each other by an undisclosed person who also worked on The Goldbergs. Furman later appeared in an episode of the series in 2022. The two were married in Malibu, California, on October 14, 2023.

== Filmography ==
=== Film ===
Year	Title	Role
2011	Cooper and the Castle Hills Gang	Penny
2016	God's Not Dead 2	Brooke Thawley
2021	Christmas Is Cancelled	Emma Lockhart

=== Television ===
Year	Title	Role	Notes
2011	The X Factor	Herself	Contestant
2013–2023	The Goldbergs	Erica Goldberg	Main role; 229 episodes
2016	Celebrity Name Game	Herself	Celebrity contestant
2016	Roommates	Hayley	Web series; 7 episodes
2018	Hell's Kitchen	Herself	Guest diner; Episode: "Hell Freezes Over"
2019	Schooled	Erica Goldberg	Episode: "Erica and Lainey's High School Reunion"
2019	Celebrity Family Feud	Herself	Episode: "Black-ish vs. The Goldbergs"
2022	The Masked Singer	Ringmaster	Runner-up (Season 7)

== Discography ==
=== Extended plays ===
Title	Details
The Way Out	Released: May 24, 2019; Label: Snot Panda Music; Format: Digital download, streaming

=== Singles ===
Title	Year	Album
"Love Sick"	2015	Non-album singles
"Until Then"	2015	Non-album singles
"Hasta Verte"	2015	Non-album singles
"Silence You"	2016	Non-album singles
"Strong Sweet & Southern"	2016	Non-album singles
"Give Me Back Sunday"	2017	Non-album singles
"If I Don't"	2019	The Way Out
"Nights and Weekends"	2019	Non-album single

=== Guest appearances ===
List of non single guest appearances, showing other performing artists
Title	Year	Other artist(s)	Album
"The Magic of a Friend"	2009	None	Tinker Bell and the Lost Treasure (Soundtrack from the Motion Picture)
"I'll Be Home for Christmas"	2012	Tim Halperin	Under That Christmas Spell
"The Magic of a Friend"	2014	None	Clochette et la Pierre de Lune (Bande originale fran)
"Love Ninja"	2017	Troy Gentile	The Goldbergs Mixtape
"Hit Me with Your Best Shot"	2017	None	The Goldbergs Mixtape
"True Colors"	2017	None	The Goldbergs Mixtape
"Tom Sawyer"	2017	AJ Michalka	The Goldbergs Mixtape
"He's the Man"	2017	Troy Gentile, AJ Michalka, Sam Lerner	The Goldbergs Mixtape
"Eternal Flame"	2017	AJ Michalka	The Goldbergs Mixtape
"Walking on Sunshine"	2017	AJ Michalka	The Goldbergs Mixtape

=== Music videos ===
Title	Year	Director	Ref.
"Love Sick" (Acoustic)	2016	Unknown	
"Strong Sweet & Southern"	2016	Ryan Hutchins	
"If I Don't"	2019	Unknown	
