= The Masked Singer (American TV series) season 7 =

The Masked Singer: The Good, The Bad, and The Cuddly
- Season 7
- Promotional poster for season seven, featuring "Prince", "Ram", and "Space Bunny"
- Starring: Robin Thicke; Jenny McCarthy Wahlberg; Ken Jeong; Nicole Scherzinger
- Hosted by: Nick Cannon
- No. of contestants: 15
- Winner: Teyana Taylor as "Firefly"
- Runner-up: Hayley Orrantia as "Ringmaster"
- No. of episodes: 12

Release
- Original network: Fox
- Original release: March 9 – May 18, 2022

Season chronology
- ← Previous; Season 6 Next → Season 8

The seventh season of the American television series The Masked Singer (also known as The Masked Singer: The Good, The Bad, and The Cuddly) premiered on Fox on March 9, 2022, following a sneak peek episode that aired on February 20, and concluded on May 18, 2022. The season was won by singer/songwriter Teyana Taylor as "Firefly", with actor/singer Hayley Orrantia finishing second as "Ringmaster", and actor/singer Cheyenne Jackson placing third as "Prince".

== Panelists and host ==
Season 7 panelists and host

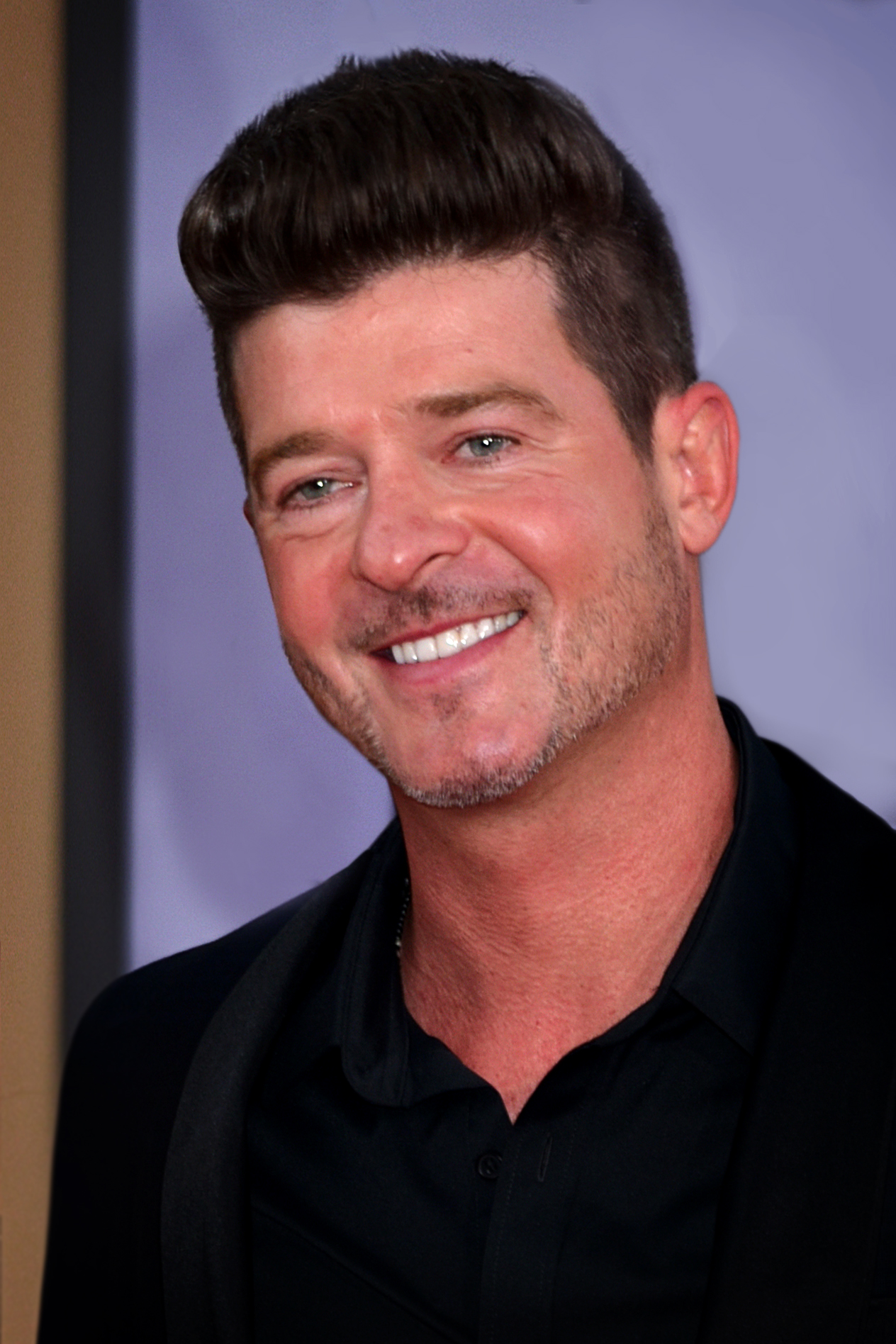
Robin Thicke

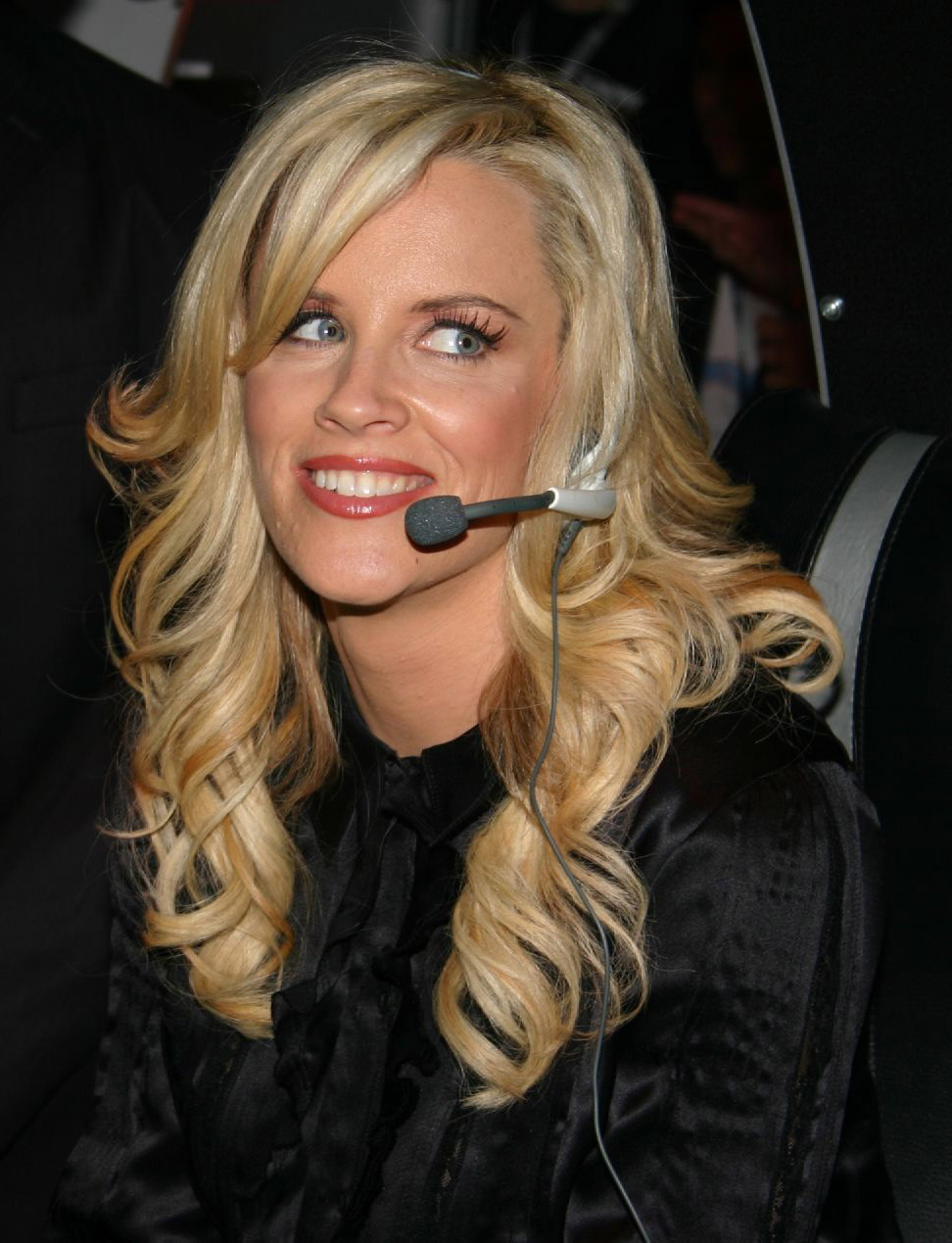
Jenny McCarthy Wahlberg

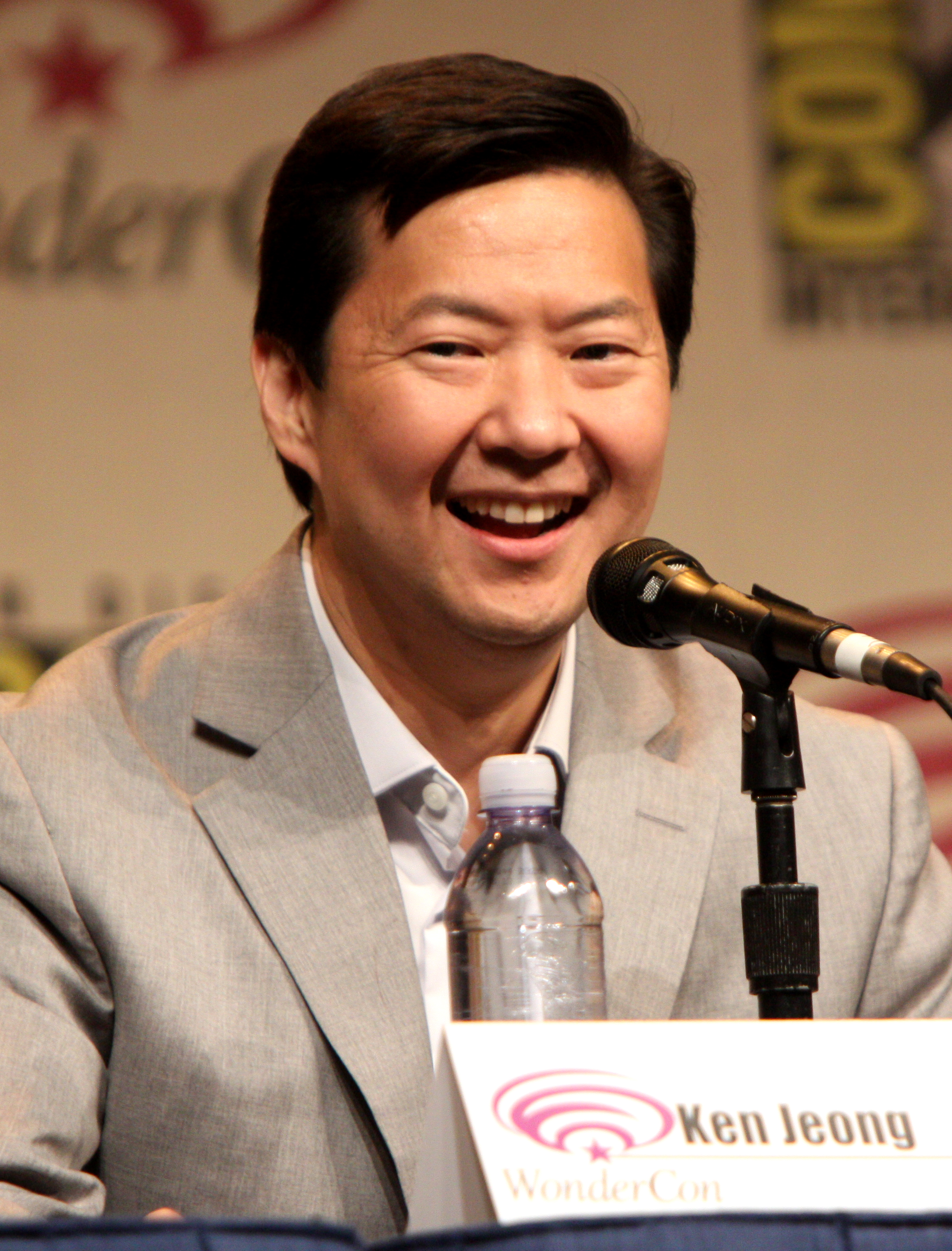
Ken Jeong

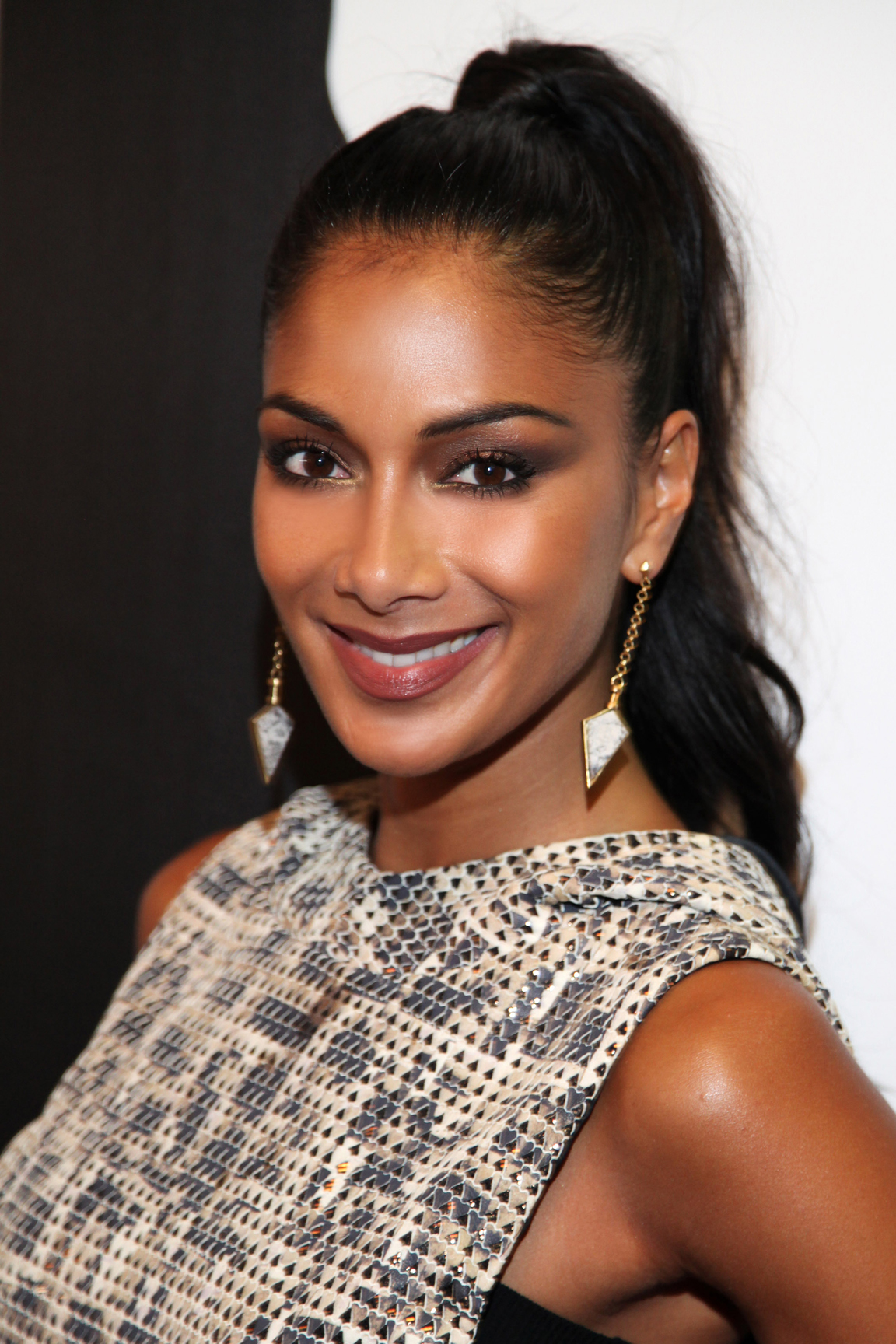
Nicole Scherzinger

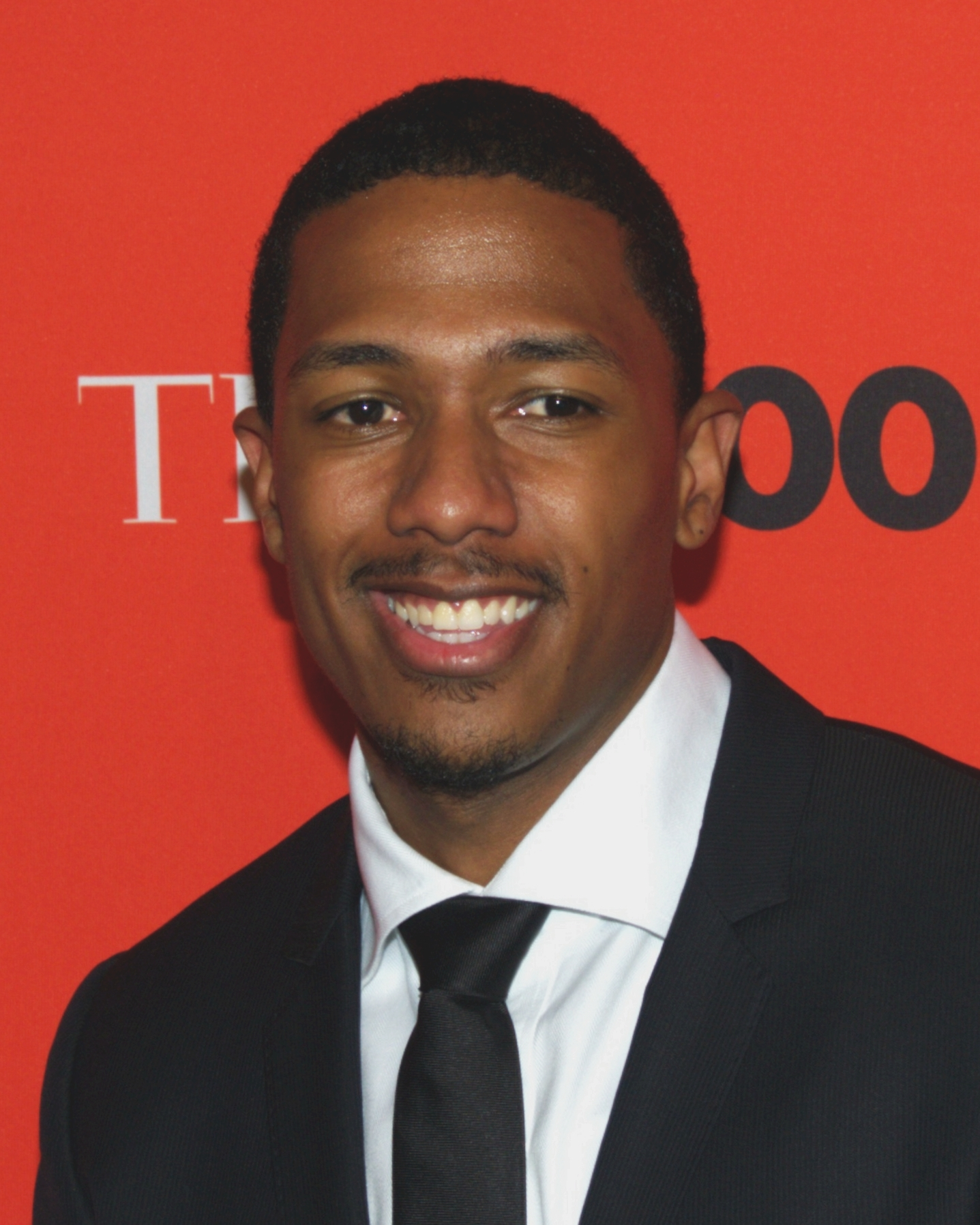
Nick Cannon

Nick Cannon, singer-songwriter Robin Thicke, television and radio personality Jenny McCarthy Wahlberg, actor and comedian Ken Jeong, and recording artist Nicole Scherzinger all returned as host and panelists.

Guest panelists in the season included Eric Stonestreet in the second episode, Nicole Byer in the fifth episode, and Leslie Jordan in the sixth episode.

Unlike the previous three seasons, there were no first impression guesses made by the panelists, and the Golden Ear Trophy was not awarded for the first time since its introduction in the fourth season.

== Contestants ==
The season features 15 contestants split into three teams known as "The Good", "The Bad", and "The Cuddly". This is the first season since the fourth season not to feature wild card contestants, but also being the first to feature teams.

"Hydra" is the first three-headed costume in the series while also sporting three legs due to its portrayers as well as featuring smoke-breathing features and a large size. "Cyclops" is the largest costume to date.

Results
Stage name		Celebrity	Occupation(s)	Episodes									
Stage name		Celebrity	Occupation(s)	1	2	3	4	5	6	7	8	9	11
Stage name		Celebrity	Occupation(s)	Round 1			Round 2			Round 3			11
G	Firefly	Teyana Taylor	Singer/songwriter	SAFE	RISK	WIN							WINNER
G	Ringmaster	Hayley Orrantia	Actor/singer				SAFE	SAFE	WIN				RUNNER-UP
G	Prince	Cheyenne Jackson	Actor/singer							SAFE	SAFE	WIN	THIRD
B	Queen Cobras	En Vogue	R&B group							SAFE	SAFE	OUT	
C	Space Bunny	Shaggy	Singer							SAFE	RISK	OUT	
C	Baby Mammoth	Kirstie Alley	Actor							SAFE	OUT		
B	Jack in the Box	Rudy Giuliani	Politician							OUT			
C	Miss Teddy	Jennifer Holliday	Singer/actor				SAFE	SAFE	OUT				
G	Armadillo	Duane Chapman	TV personality				SAFE	RISK	OUT				
B	Hydra (Note: Because of Hydra's three-legged design and large size, the costume had to be assembled back stage while Hydra had to be wheeled out on a special platform to get it to and from the stage.)	Penn & Teller	Magicians/comedians				SAFE	OUT					
C	Lemur	Christie Brinkley	Model/actor				OUT						
C	Thingamabob	Jordan Mailata	NFL player	SAFE	SAFE	OUT							
B	Cyclops	Jorge Garcia	Actor	SAFE	SAFE	OUT							
B	Ram	Joe Buck	Sportscaster	SAFE	OUT								
G	McTerrier	Duff Goldman	Pastry chef	OUT									

- G The masked singer is on Team Good.
- B The masked singer is on Team Bad.
- C The masked singer is on Team Cuddly.
- WIN The masked singer won their respective round and moved on to the finale.
- SAFE The masked singer was safe from elimination.
- RISK The masked singer was in the bottom two, but was not eliminated.
- OUT The masked singer was eliminated from the competition and unmasked.
- The masked singer did not perform.
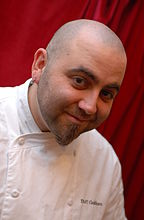
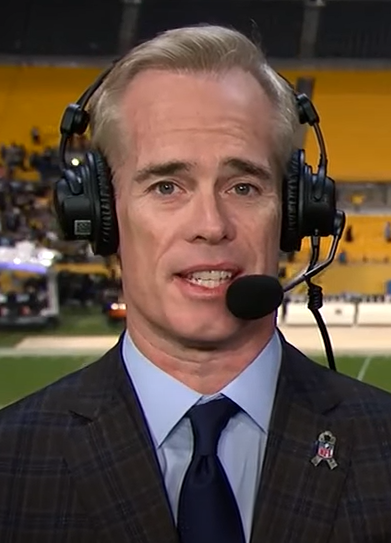
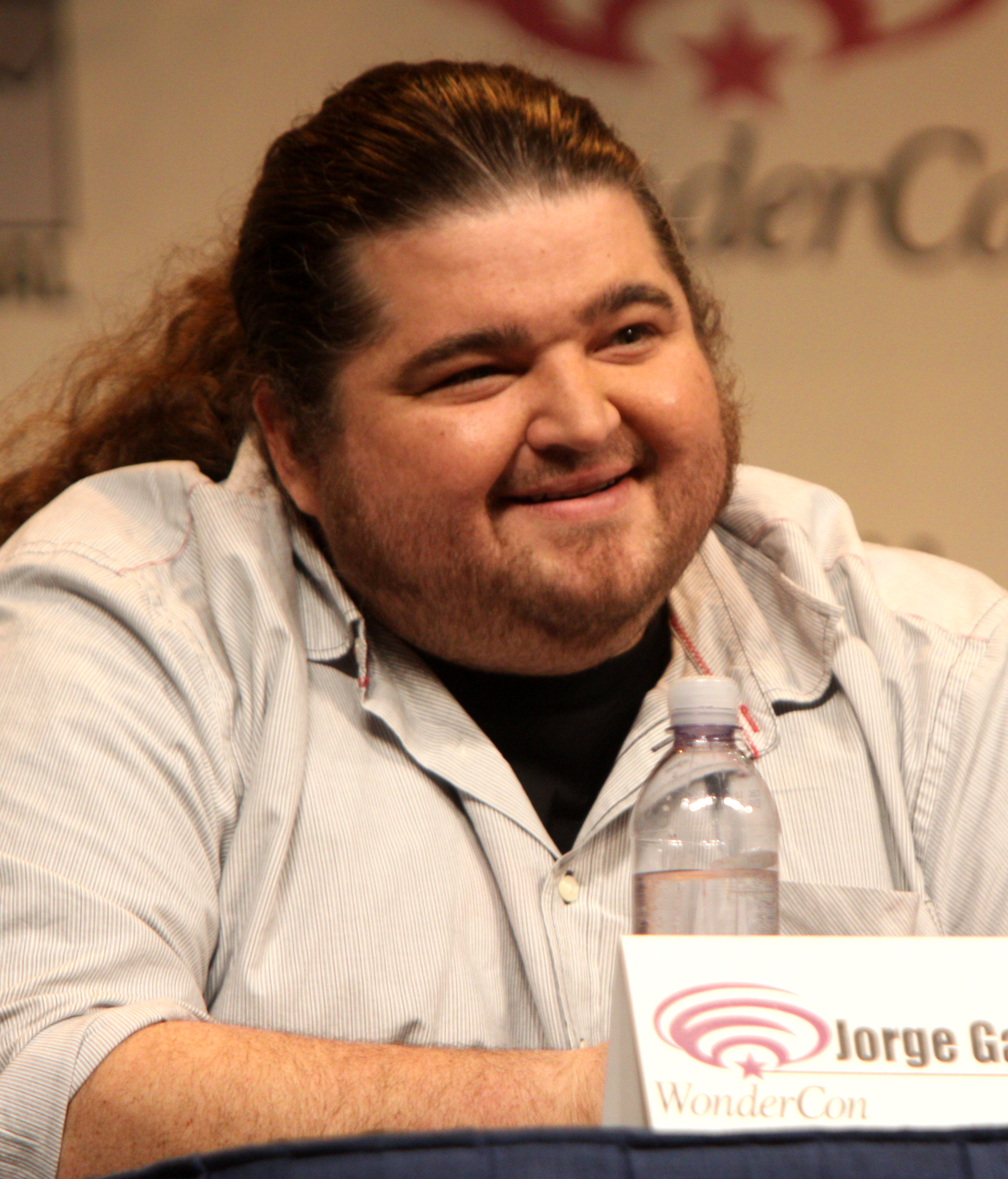
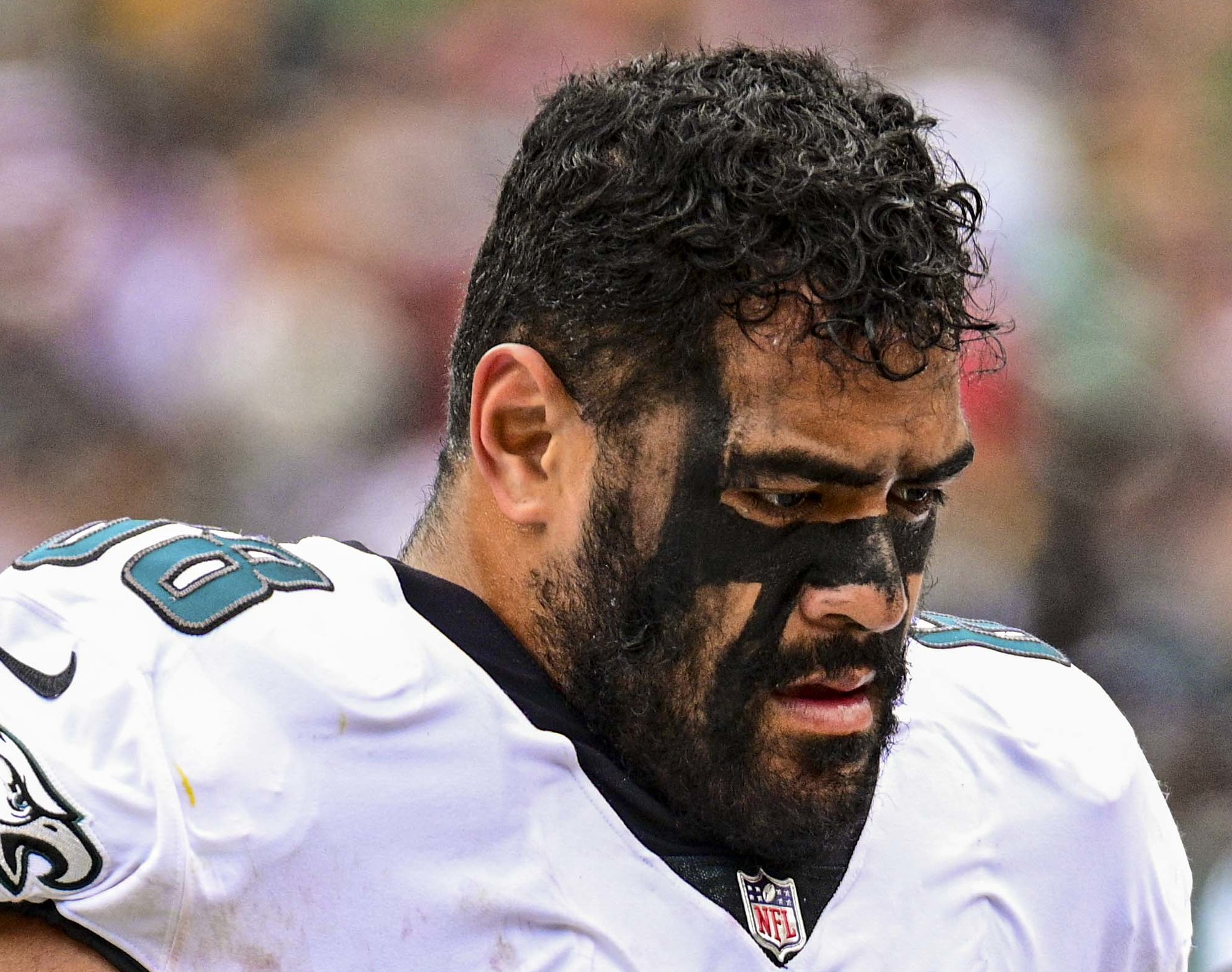
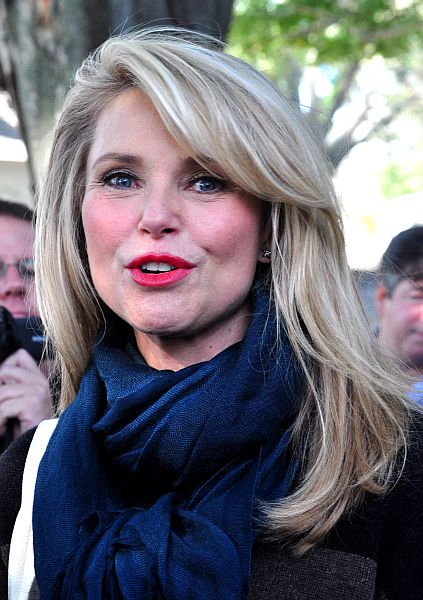
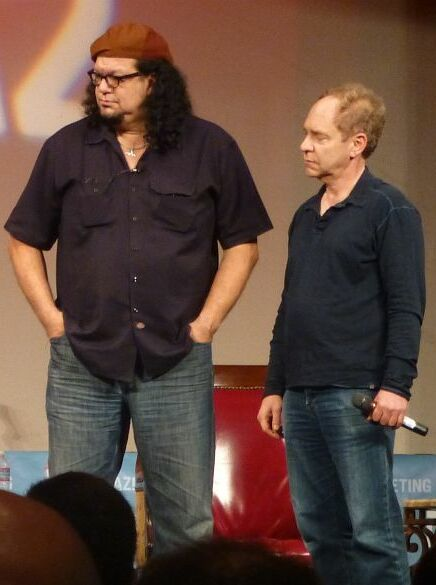
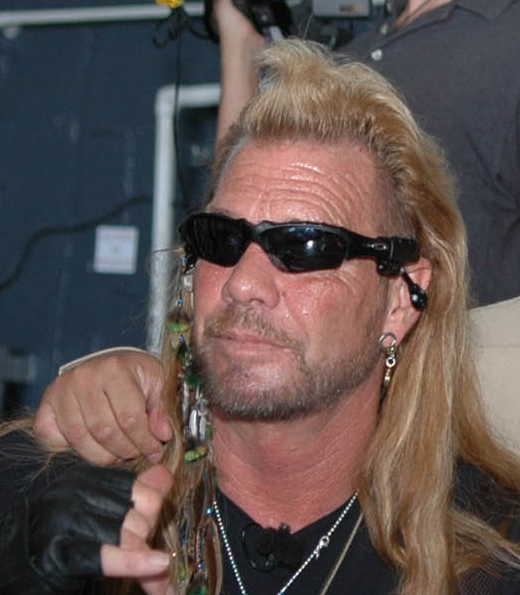
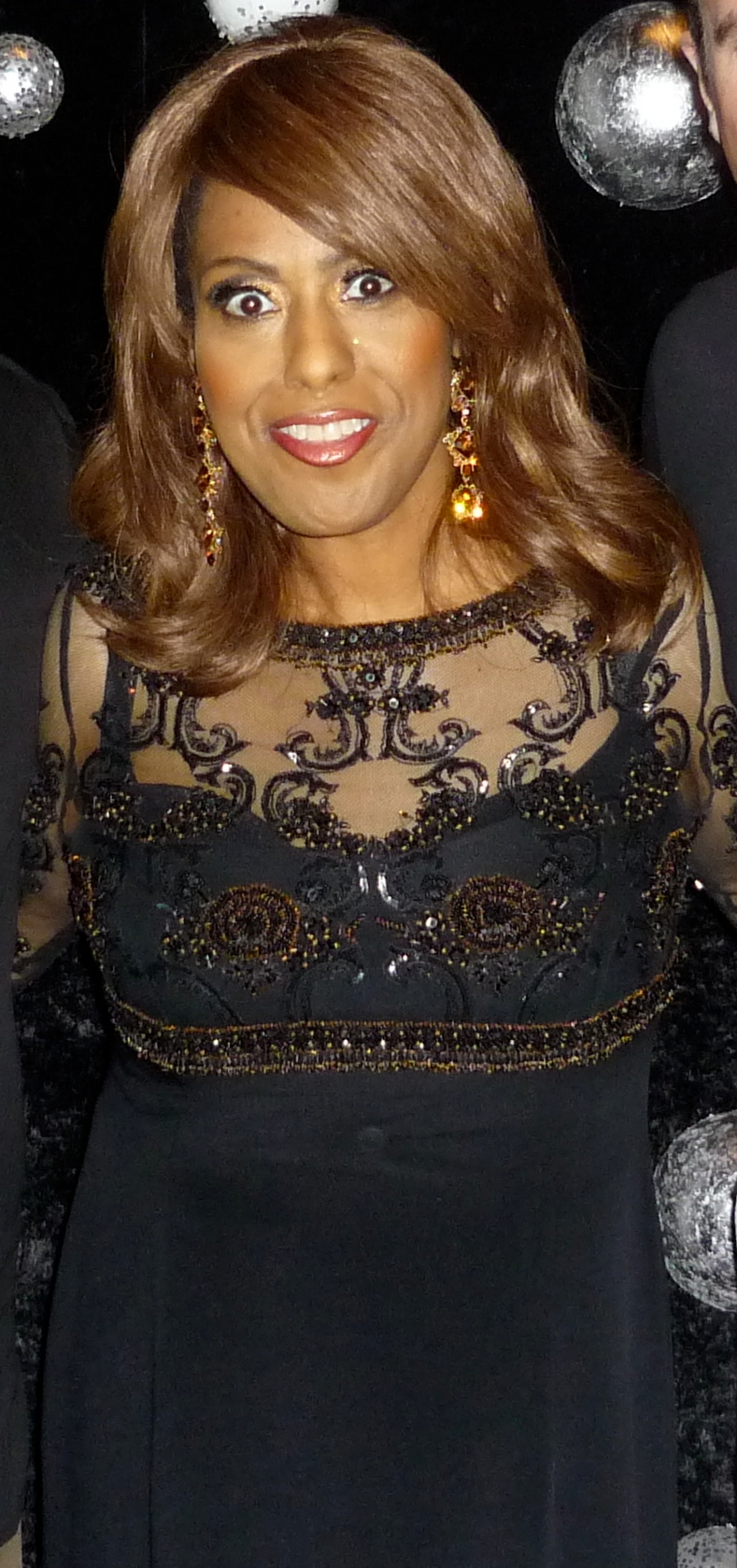
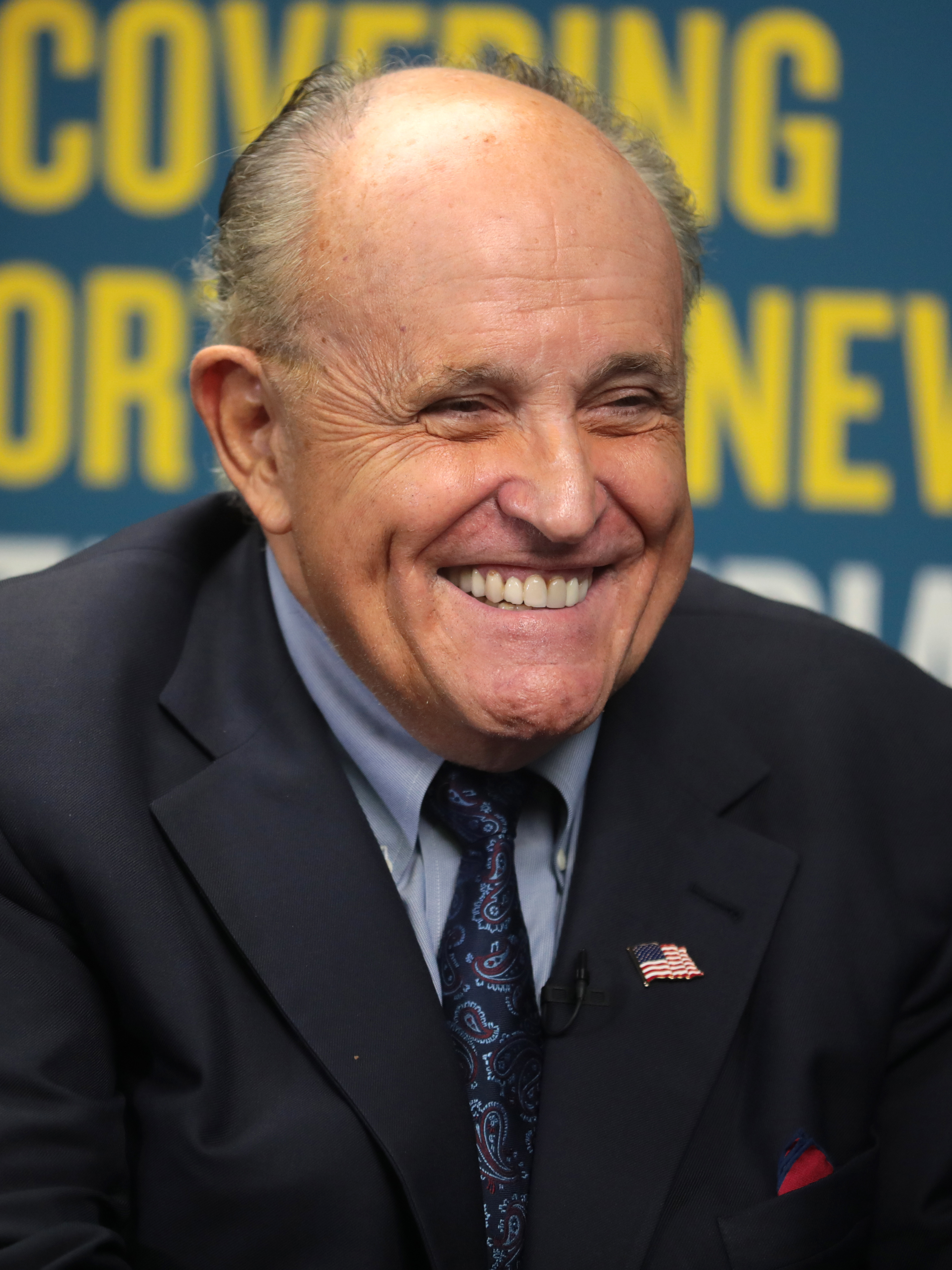
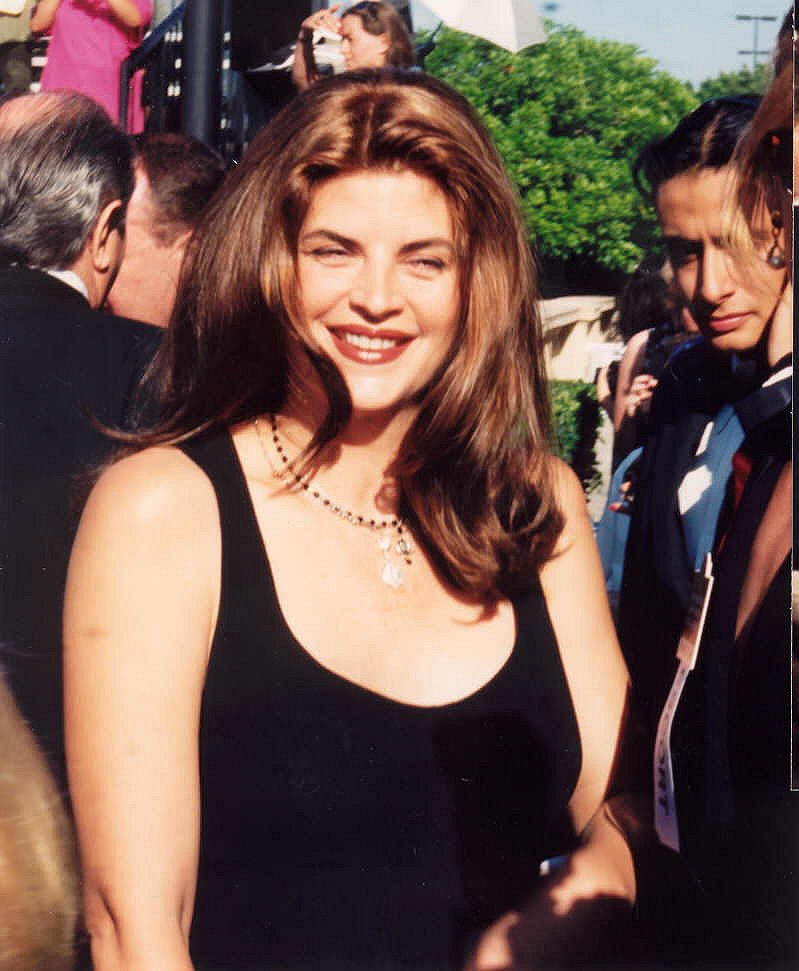
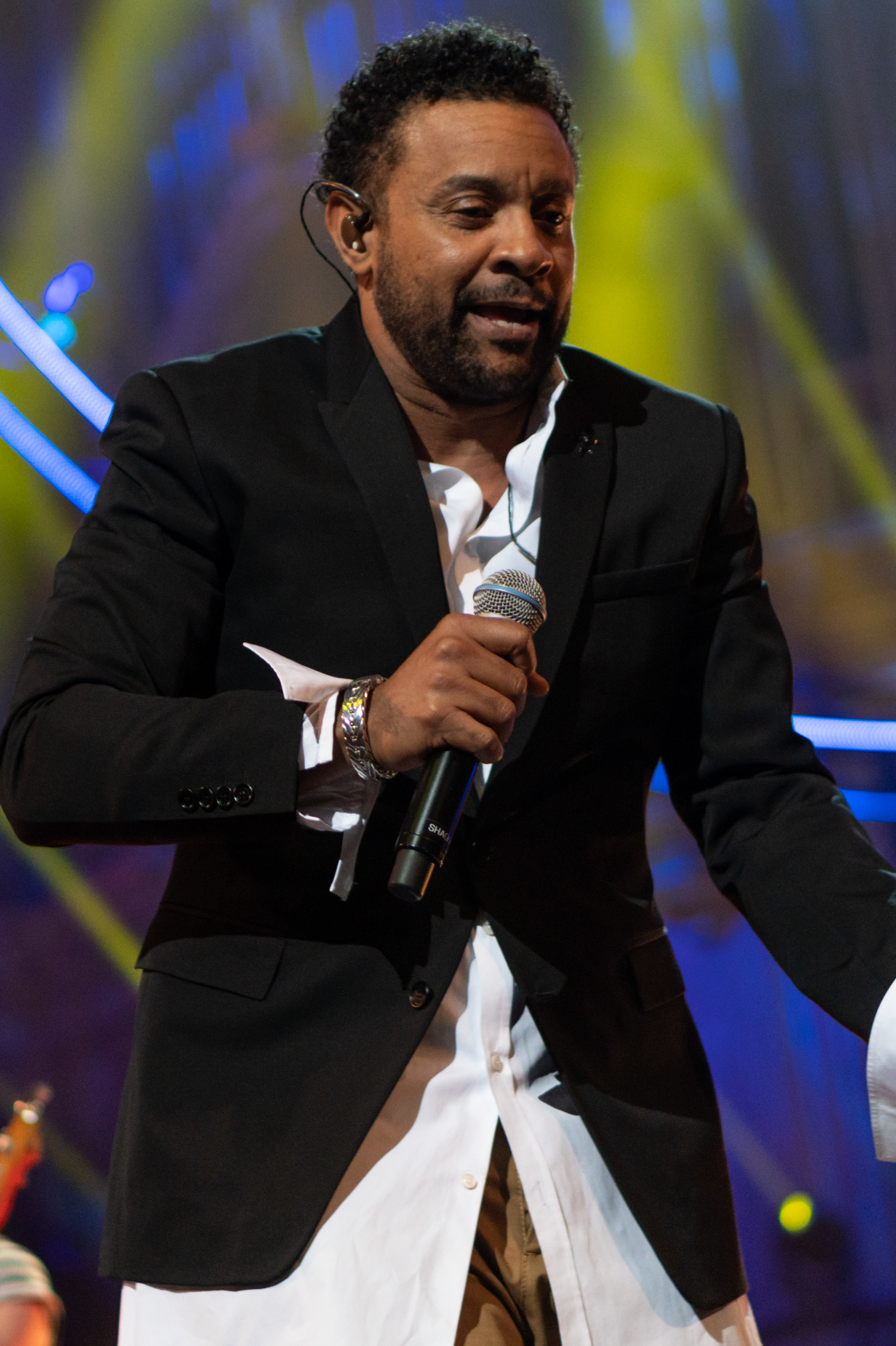
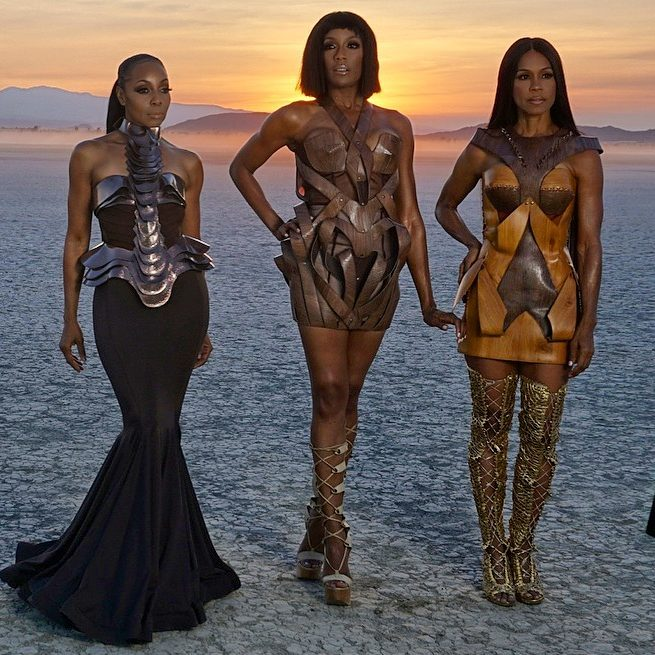
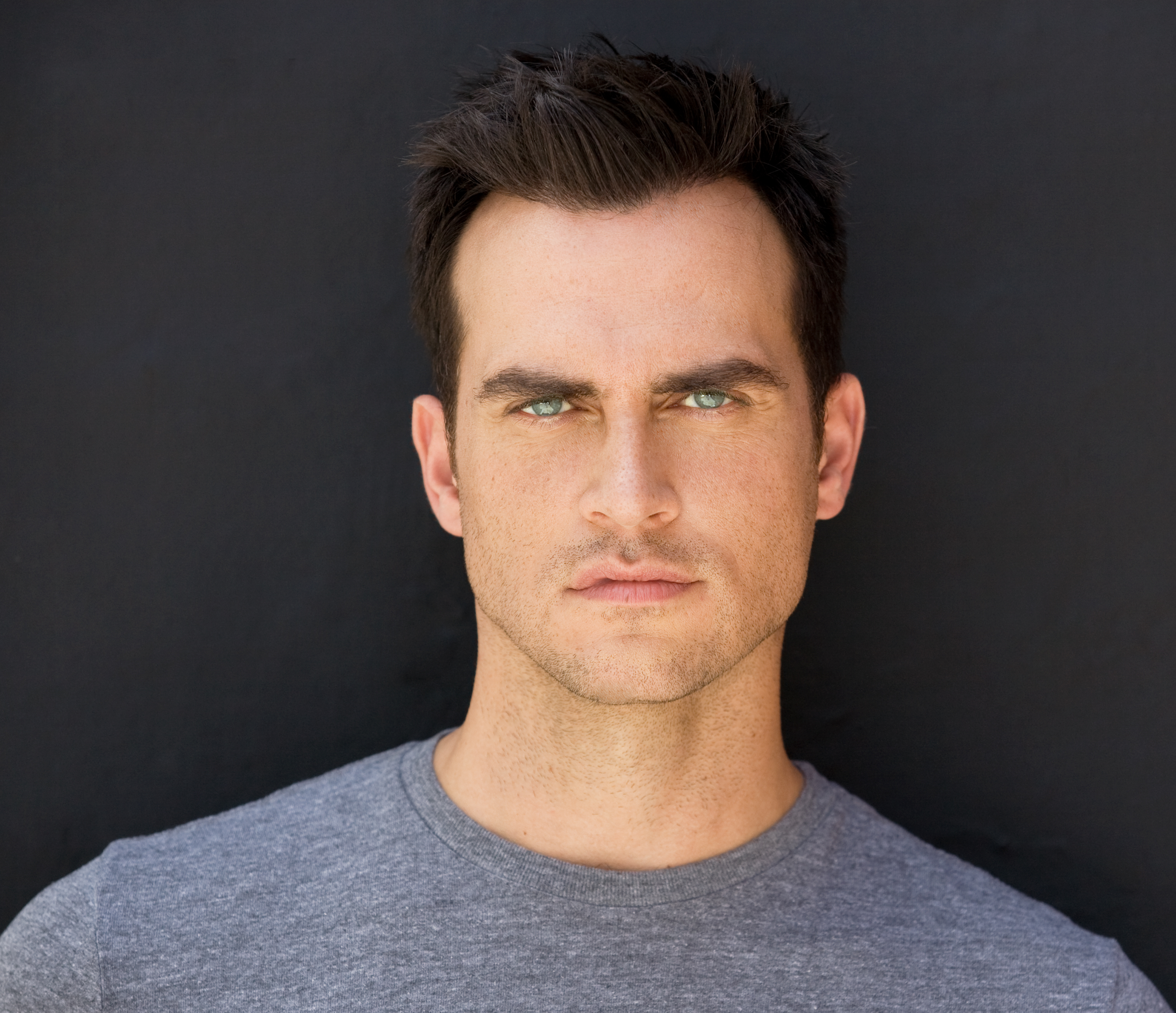
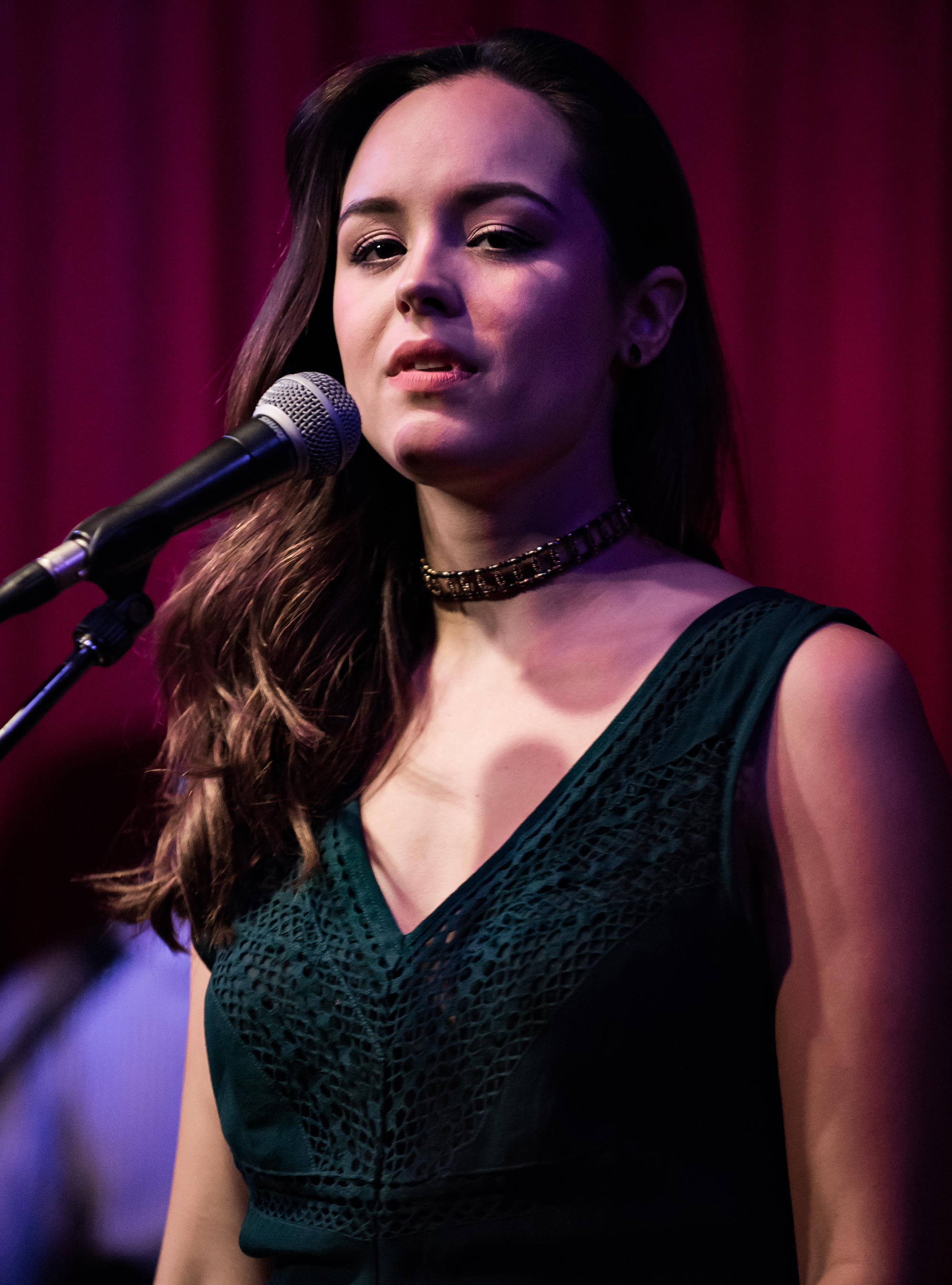
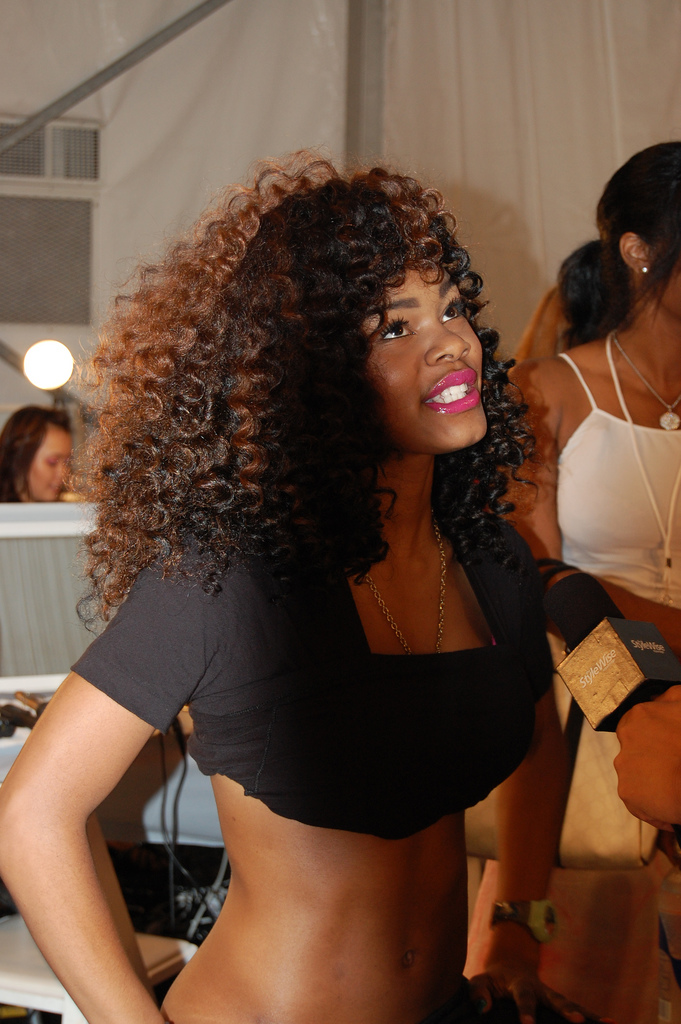
The celebrities who competed in the seventh season of The Masked Singer, pictured in order of elimination (L–R):
Duff Goldman ("McTerrier"), Joe Buck ("Ram"), Jorge Garcia ("Cyclops"), Jordan Mailata ("Thingamabob"), Christie Brinkley ("Lemur"), Penn & Teller ("Hydra"), Duane Chapman ("Armadillo"), Jennifer Holliday ("Miss Teddy"), Rudy Giuliani ("Jack in the Box"), Kirstie Alley ("Baby Mammoth"), Shaggy ("Space Bunny"), En Vogue ("Queen Cobras"), Cheyenne Jackson ("Prince"), Hayley Orrantia ("Ringmaster"), and Teyana Taylor ("Firefly")

== Episodes ==
=== Week 1 (March 9) ===
Performances on the first episode
#	Stage name	Song	Identity	Result
1	Thingamabob	"Wanted Dead or Alive" by Bon Jovi	undisclosed	SAFE
2	McTerrier	"Working for the Weekend" by Loverboy (Note: After this performance, McTerrier's mask accidentally came off and he had to shield his head while the panelists shielded their eyes until a crew member ran out and put the mask back on.)	Duff Goldman	OUT
3	Cyclops	"My Sacrifice" by Creed	undisclosed	SAFE
4	Firefly	"Ain't Nobody" by Chaka Khan (Note: The performance was cut short due to a medical incident where Firefly's portrayer started coughing and had to be taken to see the on-site medical staff. After recovering from the incident, the performance was redone after Ram's performance.)	undisclosed	SAFE
5	Ram	"I Want You to Want Me" by Cheap Trick	undisclosed	SAFE

=== Week 2 (March 16) ===
Performances on the second episode
#	Stage name	Song	Result	
1	Firefly	"P.Y.T. (Pretty Young Thing)" by Michael Jackson	RISK	
2	Cyclops	"Suspicious Minds" by Elvis Presley	SAFE	
3	Ram	"Learn to Fly" by Foo Fighters	RISK	
4	Thingamabob	"Perfect" by Ed Sheeran	SAFE	
Duel			Identity	Result
1	Ram	"Take Me Home, Country Roads" by John Denver	Joe Buck	OUT
2	Firefly	"God Is a Woman" by Ariana Grande	undisclosed	SAFE

=== Week 3 (March 23) ===
- Group performance: "I Got You (I Feel Good)" by James Brown

Performances on the third episode
#	Stage name	Song	Identity	Result
1	Thingamabob	"Classic" by MKTO	Jordan Mailata	OUT
2	Cyclops	"Flashdance (What a Feeling)" by Irene Cara	Jorge Garcia	OUT
3	Firefly	"Attention" by Charlie Puth	undisclosed	WIN

=== Week 4 (March 30) ===
Performances on the fourth episode
#	Stage name	Song	Identity	Result
1	Miss Teddy	"Tell It to My Heart" by Taylor Dayne	undisclosed	SAFE
2	Hydra	"Hey, Soul Sister" by Train	undisclosed	SAFE
3	Ringmaster	"The Climb" by Miley Cyrus	undisclosed	SAFE
4	Lemur	"I Feel the Earth Move" by Carole King	Christie Brinkley	OUT
5	Armadillo	"Secret Agent Man" by Johnny Rivers	undisclosed	SAFE

=== Week 5 (April 6) ===
Performances on the fifth episode
#	Stage name	Song	Result	
1	Ringmaster	"Super Bass" by Nicki Minaj	SAFE	
2	Armadillo	"I Fought the Law" by The Bobby Fuller Four	RISK	
3	Hydra	"Sharp Dressed Man" by ZZ Top	RISK	
4	Miss Teddy	"Tell Me You Love Me" by Demi Lovato	SAFE	
Duel			Identity	Result
1	Armadillo	"Walking the Dog" by Rufus Thomas	undisclosed	SAFE
2	Hydra	"Two Princes" by Spin Doctors	Penn and Teller	OUT

=== Week 6 (April 13) ===
- Group performance: "One Way or Another" by Blondie

Performances on the sixth episode
#	Stage name	Song	Identity	Result
1	Miss Teddy	"Mercy" by Duffy	Jennifer Holliday	OUT
2	Armadillo	"Amazing Grace"	Duane Chapman	OUT
3	Ringmaster	"I Will Always Love You" by Dolly Parton	undisclosed	WIN

=== Week 7 (April 20) ===
Performances on the seventh episode
#	Stage name	Song	Identity	Result
1	Prince	"La Copa de la Vida" by Ricky Martin	undisclosed	SAFE
2	Baby Mammoth	"Walkin' After Midnight" by Patsy Cline	undisclosed	SAFE
3	Queen Cobras	"Good as Hell" by Lizzo	undisclosed	SAFE
4	Jack in the Box	"Bad to the Bone" by George Thorogood & the Destroyers	Rudy Giuliani	OUT
5	Space Bunny	"Jump in the Line" by Harry Belafonte	undisclosed	SAFE

=== Week 8 (April 27) ===
Performances on the eighth episode
#	Stage name	Song	Result	
1	Queen Cobras	"I Say a Little Prayer" by Aretha Franklin	SAFE	
2	Space Bunny	"All Night Long (All Night)" by Lionel Richie	RISK	
3	Baby Mammoth	"The Shoop Shoop Song (It's in His Kiss)" by Cher	RISK	
4	Prince	"Lay Me Down" by Sam Smith	SAFE	
Duel			Identity	Result
1	Baby Mammoth	"Me Too" by Meghan Trainor	Kirstie Alley	OUT
2	Space Bunny	"Do You Really Want to Hurt Me" by Culture Club	undisclosed	SAFE

=== Week 9 (May 4) ===
- Group performance: "Roar" by Katy Perry

Performances on the ninth episode
#	Stage name	Song	Identity	Result
1	Prince	"Sir Duke" by Stevie Wonder	undisclosed	WIN
2	Space Bunny	"Now That We Found Love" by Heavy D & the Boyz ft. Aaron Hall	Shaggy	OUT
3	Queen Cobras	"Leave the Door Open" by Bruno Mars, Anderson .Paak & Silk Sonic	En Vogue	OUT

=== Week 10 (May 18) ===
Performances on the eleventh episode
#	Stage name	Song	Identity	Result
Round 1
1	Prince	"Viva la Vida" by Coldplay	Cheyenne Jackson	THIRD PLACE
2	Firefly	"Bad Girl" by Usher	undisclosed	SAFE
3	Ringmaster	"Gravity" by Sara Bareilles	undisclosed	SAFE
Round 2
4	Firefly	"Lost Without U" by Robin Thicke	Teyana Taylor	WINNER
5	Ringmaster	"Waking Up in Vegas" by Katy Perry	Hayley Orrantia	RUNNER-UP

== Ratings ==
Viewership and ratings per episode of The Masked Singer (American TV series) season 7
No.	Title	Air date	Timeslot (ET)	Rating/share (18–49)	Viewers (millions)	DVR (18–49)	DVR viewers (millions)	Total (18–49)	Total viewers (millions)	Ref.
0	"The Masked Singer Sneak Peek"	February 20, 2022	Sunday 7:00 p.m.	0.5/5	2.26	0.1	0.39	0.6	2.65	(Note: Live+7 ratings were unavailable, so Live+3 ratings have been used instead.)
1	"Masks Back - The Good, The Bad & The Cuddly - Round 1"	March 9, 2022	Wednesday 8:00 p.m.	0.9/7	4.15	0.4	1.80	1.3	5.95	
2	"Masks at Dawn - Round 1"	March 16, 2022	Wednesday 8:00 p.m.	0.7/6	4.03	0.3	1.63	1.1	5.66	
3	"The Double Unmasking - Round 1 Finals"	March 23, 2022	Wednesday 8:00 p.m.	0.7/6	4.17	0.3	1.49	1.0	5.66	
4	"Masking For It - The Good, The Bad & The Cuddly - Round 2"	March 30, 2022	Wednesday 8:00 p.m.	0.8/7	4.39	0.3	1.41	1.1	5.75	
5	"Masking for a Duel - Round 2"	April 6, 2022	Wednesday 8:00 p.m.	0.7/6	3.97	0.3	1.30	1.0	5.27	
6	"The Double Mask Off - Round 2 Finals"	April 13, 2022	Wednesday 8:00 p.m.	0.7/6	3.97	0.4	1.40	1.0	5.27	
7	"Don't Mask, Don't Tell - The Good, The Bad & The Cuddly - Round 3"	April 20, 2022	Wednesday 8:00 p.m.	0.6/5	3.83	0.3	1.60	1.0	5.43	
8	"The Mask of Least Resistance - Round 3"	April 27, 2022	Wednesday 8:00 p.m.	0.7/6	4.17	—N/a	—N/a	—N/a	—N/a	
9	"One Mask Hurrah - Round 3 Finals"	May 4, 2022	Wednesday 8:00 p.m.	0.7/6	4.06	—N/a	—N/a	—N/a	—N/a	
10	"Road to the Finals"	May 11, 2022	Wednesday 8:00 p.m.	0.5/4	3.00	—N/a	—N/a	—N/a	—N/a	
11	"Season Finale: I'm Team Good, Thanks for Masking"	May 18, 2022	Wednesday 8:00 p.m.	0.7/6	4.19	—N/a	—N/a	—N/a	—N/a	

== Controversy ==
Reports prior to the season premiere identified that controversial figure Rudy Giuliani was one of the masked performers during this season, reportedly in one of the first episodes taped. Giuliani's unmasking reportedly prompted panelists Jeong and Thicke to storm off the set as an act of protest; however, later reports indicated that Thicke only left to check on Jeong. After Giuliani was not unmasked in the premiere episode, a Fox Entertainment vice president told Newsweek, "...like most productions, the groups are not necessarily taped sequentially, so we don't always know the order they will air," with Newsweek adding on that his appearance was not cut from the show. The unmasking later occurred in the seventh episode broadcast, showing the panelists' surprised reactions, as well as Jeong quietly walking off during Giuliani's unmasked performance. (Prior to walking away, Jeong can be seen visibly upset at this reveal, has his arms crossed, and does not partake in the elimination interview.) The casting was widely criticized, and was considered by Wired as a poorly-executed ratings grab, as the episode saw a significant drop in viewership compared to prior episodes in the season. Rob Wade, Fox's vice president of alternative entertainment, said that they were pleased with the choice to include Giuliani as the show "is all about delivering jaw dropping moments", and was only disappointed that sources leaked the reveal early.
