= Patrick Robinson =

Patrick Robinson may refer to:

- Patrick Robinson (athlete) (born 1943), Jamaican Olympic sprinter
- Patrick Robinson (author) (born 1940), British novelist and newspaper columnist
- Patrick Robinson (fashion designer) (born 1966), American fashion designer
- Patrick Lipton Robinson (born 1944), United Nations judge
- Patrick Robinson (actor) (born 1963), English actor
- Patrick Robinson (wide receiver) (born 1969), American football wide receiver
- Patrick Robinson (cornerback) (born 1987), American football cornerback
- Patrick Robinson (cyclist) (born 1994), British freeride mountain biker
- Patrick Robinson (basketball) (born 1999), American basketball player

== See also ==
- Pat Robinson (disambiguation)
