= Rise and Fall (Tim Halperin album) =

Studio album by Tim Halperin
- Released: September 27, 2011
- Genre: singer-songwriter
- Length: 51:13
- Label: 24 Hour Distribution
- Producer: Jordan Critz

Tim Halperin chronology
| Make Or Break EP (2009) | Rise and Fall (2011) | Under that Christmas Spell (2012) |

Rise and Fall is the debut full-length album by Tim Halperin, released on September 27, 2011. It reached No. 1 on the iTunes Singer-Songwriter Chart, and debuted at No. 14 on the Billboard Heatseekers Chart.

== Production ==
Halperin had started work on the album over a year earlier, only to put the release date on hold to fulfill his Idol contract. He spent much of 2010 working on the recordings with producer Jordan Critz (The Fray, Third Eye Blind and Lifehouse). According to Halperin, "With this record, because it's my first full-length album, I wanted to make sure that it was the most me. That it had songs on it that I felt like best represented who I am, not only as a songwriter, but as a person."

== Release, reception ==
Rise and Fall was released on September 27, 2011. It rose to No. 1 on the iTunes Singer-Songwriter Chart, and held that position for 4 days. Rise and Fall also debuted at No. 14 on the Billboard Heatseekers Chart. The CD underwent a second official release on December 6, 2011. The first track on the album, "All You Got," was written for Kidd's Kids, with all proceeds going to the organization.

=== "The Last Song" ===
'The Last Song'
Excerpt of Halperin's single "The Last Song"

His first single for Rise and Fall and one of the first tracks recorded for the album, "The Last Song," as of September 26, 2011 was in the top ten on the Singer-Songwriters Songs chart on iTunes.

For the music video of "The Last Song" fans donated a budget of $8,000. According to a description of the scenes, "Halperin crawls through his piano, then wanders through a field, drives an old convertible down a suburban road, wanders across a movie set, finds himself at a birthday party and plunges underwater. He eventually winds up in a forest at night, wearing a white suit and coattails as people dance underneath bright lights hanging from trees."

== Track listing ==
All tracks are written by Tim Halperin

| No. | Title | Writer(s) | Length |
|---|---|---|---|
| 1. | "All You Got" | Jordan Critz / Tim Halperin | 3:30 |
| 2. | "Pretty Girls" | Tim Halperin | 3:32 |
| 3. | "The Last Song" | Tim Halperin | 4:20 |
| 4. | "She Sets Me Free" | Tim Halperin | 3:36 |
| 5. | "Bullet" | Tim Halperin | 4:09 |
| 6. | "Crash Course To Hollywood" | Tim Halperin | 3:44 |
| 7. | "I Gotta Know" | Tim Halperin | 3:24 |
| 8. | "Where I'm Going" | Tim Halperin | 4:39 |
| 9. | "I Wanna Fall in Love" | Tim Halperin | 3:38 |
| 10. | "Memories on the Ground" | Tim Halperin | 4:47 |
| 11. | "New York" | Tim Halperin | 4:05 |
| 12. | "I Believe" (Itunes Exclusive) | Jordan Critz / Tim Halperin / Josh Jenkins | 4:04 |
| 13. | "American Fame" (Itunes Exclusive) | Tim Halperin | 3:45 |
| Total length: | | | 51:13 |
