= Jared McCloud =

American singer-songwriter (born 1980)

Jared Ross McCloud (born June 24, 1980) is an American singer-songwriter, currently living in Maine. He had success with his record, Romance of the Atlantic, released on Sling Slang Records on May 22, 2009.

McCloud's style ranges from folk to alternative and he is known for playing intimate solo acoustic performances, or playing with a backing band that brings a rock and roll element to his music. He has been well received by both critics and fans, and continues to tour and write.

== Early life ==
McCloud was born in Bedford, Texas. Shortly after he was born, his parents divorced and his mother took him and his brother to Connecticut, where she was born. McCloud would later claim that his musical influences came from his brother (who was listening to the 1980s metal) and his mother, an avid Motown fan.

McCloud began playing guitar at age five when his brother put one in his hands. From there he would spend hours playing along with the radio and making up his own songs.

== Career ==
McCloud grew up playing in hard rock/heavy metal bands. A lot of these bands would "fizzle out" rather quickly due to ever changing members and different musical tastes. One such band MERCY DROWNS did have some success, but when it seemed like the band might go somewhere, it fell apart.

McCloud began writing an album that would go on to be 1717 Vine St. The album was self-released in 2005 and recorded with session musicians. McCloud began playing all over his native Connecticut and New York trying to get the songs heard. This led to a bit of success, playing bigger and bigger stages until finally he was headlining regularly. Around this time Jared's musical tastes began to change and he was focused more and more on being able to be a better songwriter. McCloud decided that he was going to break up his backing band and play solo acoustic shows.

Jared began writing the songs that would lead to him being signed by indie label Sling Slang Records. Recorded at Aliehn productions in Bristol, Connecticut, Romance of the Atlantic was a soundtrack to a short story that McCloud had written. The album quickly caught on at national and college radio across the country and received positive reviews. In 2010, McCloud embarked on his first headlining tour that took him from the Northeastern United States to the Mid-West.

In September 2010, McCloud began work on a new collection of songs. Recorded at Seventh Wave Studios in Harrisburg, Pennsylvania with record producer Jason Rubal (The Dresden Dolls), these songs would become the record Painful Words Of Loving Grace. McCloud decided to release this new record himself on February 4, 2011 and put on two release party shows in Hartford, CT, and Portland, ME to celebrate it. Following its release McCloud began playing with artists such as Vertical Horizon, Candlebox, Civil Twilight, Tony Lucca, and Ernie Halter.

Later in November 2011, McCloud released a "download-only" record on his website. Feels Like Home- Live From Portland, ME, was recorded at Slainte in Portland, ME. The free 7 song download includes solo performances of some of McCloud's best known work, as well as a cover of Tom Waits's "Chocolate Jesus" and a new song called "Hail Mary".

In August 2014, McCloud released To Live And Die In Your Arms on Noble Steed Music. The record was partially crowd funded with a Kickstarter campaign, and reached No. 46 on the iTunes Top 200 Singer-Songwriter chart.

== Discography ==
- 1717 Vine St. (Self released) 2005
- Romance of the Atlantic (Sling Slang Records) 2009
- Painful Words of Loving Grace (Self released) 2011
- Feels Like Home: LIVE From Portland, ME (Self released) 2011
- To Live and Die In Your Arms (Noble Steed Music) 2014

== Press ==
Jared McCloud is that rare thing; an artist that just cannot be compared to any of his contemporaries. His musical spectrum is about as broad as it is possible to be as he encompasses practically every rock subgenre you can imagine. I would say that he is a talent and that this album is not far off astonishing but that wouldn't even begin to do him justice.

— John Edden, AltSounds.com (March 17, 2011)

Imagine for a moment. all of that speaker-blowing intensity turned inward, shredding the artist down till there is nothing lift of him but the purity of his being. That's what this album is. Painful Words Of Loving Grace is raw and real, you can hear the scrape of flesh across steel and taste the soul of Jared's passion as he performs. Bold, vulnerable and genuine. Quite a moving experience

— Allen Foster, Songwriter's Monthly (February 4, 2011)

It's hard to compare Jared McCloud to any contemporary artists. And that's a good thing. Painful Words Of Loving Grace contains the intricacies and complexities of a seasoned song writer while retaining the pop-catchiness of an accessible rock record. It's clear Jared is shooting for far bigger things. And I would easily say he succeeded. 5 stars.

— John Dotson, CT/MA Music (February 3, 2011)
