= Franklin & Vermont =

Studio album by Ernie Halter
- Released: July 28, 2010
- Genre: Pop/Rock
- Label: Rock Ridge Music
- Producer: Ernie Halter

Ernie Halter chronology
| Ernie Halter: Live (2009) | Franklin & Vermont (2010) |

Franklin & Vermont is Ernie Halter's full-length album, released on June 28, 2010. The album is named after the cross streets where Halter lives in Los Angeles.

== Track listing ==
1. "Hard to Let a Good Love Go" – 3:43
2. "Angel" – 3:33
3. "Gone" – 2:46
4. "Almost You" – 3:48
5. "Meant to Be" – 4:37 (Melissa Polinar cover)
6. "Black Coffee In Bed" – 3:25 (Squeeze cover)
7. "Come Home to Me" – 2:31
8. "Yes I Am" – 3:13
9. "In My Place" – 2:46 (Coldplay cover)
10. "We Got Love" – 2:51
11. "This Beautiful Ache (featuring Amy Kuney)" – 3:55
