= Christmas Is Cancelled =

Christmas Is Canceled
- Theatrical release poster
- Directed by: Prarthana Mohan
- Screenplay by: Sara Endsley
- Produced by: Peter Bevan; Neil Elman; Larry Grimaldi; John Lerchen; Michael Madnick; David Brown Massey; Michael Meilander; Hannah Pillemer; Iman Sharabash; Sarah Sharp; Nicolas T. Silva; Tim Stearns; Fernando Szew
- Starring: Hayley Orrantia; Janel Parrish; Dermot Mulroney
- Music by: Wendy Levy
- Production companies: Particular Crowd; MarVista Entertainment; The Line Film Company
- Distributed by: Lionsgate; Nu Metro Films; Amazon Prime Video; HBO Max
- Release date: December 16, 2021
- Running time: 97 minutes
- Country: United States
- Language: English
- Box office: $112,145

Christmas Is Cancelled (previously titled The Fight Before Christmas) is a 2021 American romantic comedy film directed by Prarthana Mohan and written by Sara Endsley. It stars Hayley Orrantia, Janel Parrish and Dermot Mulroney in the lead roles. The film is about a girl named Emma, whose father and her high school frenemy start dating, so she embarks on a mission to break up relationship between the happy couple.

Christmas Is Cancelled was theatrically released on December 16, 2021, and was produced by Particular Crowd, MarVista Entertainment, Line Film Company and Lionsgate.

== Plot ==
It has been two years since Emma (Hayley Orrantia) lost her mom, and the wound still feels pretty fresh. She feels obligated to take care of her dad, Jack (Dermot Mulroney), and when she heads home after a research trip to spend the holidays with him, discovers some incredibly distressing news: that her father is dating her high school frenemy Brandy (Janel Parrish). Emma is horrified by this revelation, to say the least, but Brandy tries her best to keep things friendly between the two of them. Unable to accept this despite efforts from both Brandy and Jack, Emma resolves to try to break the two of them up before Christmas – which is four days away.

With the reluctant support of her best friend Charlyne (Emilie Modaff) and a hunky bartender named Josh (Michael Naizu), Emma tries to pull off some relatively mundane schemes to split up Brandy and her dad. Try as she might, however, the two seem determined to brush it off, even when things get tense. Emma ignores her own budding connection with Josh in favor of her obsession with ruining her dad's relationship, and puts Charlyne in an uncomfortable position at the same time. With important relationships (and Christmas!) at stake, Emma must come to her senses before it is too late.

== Cast ==
- Hayley Orrantia as Emma Lockhart
- Janel Parrish as Brandy Barnes
- Dermot Mulroney as Jack Lockhart
- Lisa McConnell as Beatrice
- Jackson Evans as Maite D
- Danny Glenn as George Portnoy
- Timothy Hull as Tom Hackett
- Emilie Modaff as Charlyne
- Michael Naizu as Josh Jamison
- Jeff Parker as Elliot Murphy
- Mirelly Taylor as Emma's mom

== Production ==
The film was announced in November 2021, with Hayley Orrantia, Janel Parrish and Dermot Mulroney cast in the lead roles.

"We love a trailer drop. Get ready for some knee slapping mayhem this holiday season! I had the BEST time filming this movie with these amazing people," Parrish shared on her Instagram.

== Release ==
The film was originally supposed to be released under the name The Fight Before Christmas, but was renamed. In the United States, the film was released on Prime Video on 17 December 2021. In various European and African countries it was theatrically released on 16 December 2021.

== Reception ==
Review aggregator Rotten Tomatoes reports that 59% ratings critics gave the film a positive review, with a rating average of 4.70/10.

== See also ==
- List of Christmas films
