= Benjy Davis Project =

American musical group

- Origin: Baton Rouge, Louisiana, United States
- Genres: Alternative Rock; Rock; Southern Rock
- Years active: 2001–present
- Label: Rock Ridge Music
- Members: Benjy Davis; Mic Capdevielle

Benjy Davis Project was formed in Baton Rouge, Louisiana in 2001 as a simple folk-rock duo, but quickly grew into a popular regional band. Eventually expanding into a six-piece group, the Benjy Davis Project has recorded four albums and two EPs. They have played across the country as headliners and support act on shows with John Mayer, Better Than Ezra, Sister Hazel, North Mississippi All-Stars and others, as well as events like the New Orleans Jazz & Heritage Festival. In 2009 and 2010, the band performed at Hotel Carolina, an annual two-day singer-songwriter festival held in South Carolina.

== History ==
=== The early years (2001–2007) ===
Louisiana singer/songwriter Benjy Davis formed the Benjy Davis Project as a folk-rock duo in Baton Rouge in 2001. Originally, the group members were Davis and drummer Mic Capdevielle. Eventually, the outfit expanded into a six-piece with the addition of Anthony Rushing (violin, mandolin, vocals), Jonathan Lawhun (guitar, banjo), Brett Bolden (bass) (later replaced by Matt Rusnak), and Michael Galasso (harmonica, keyboards, vocals). The group self-released its first album More Than Local on June 11, 2002 and an EP The Practice Sessions, on May 4, 2004. Bogalusa issued their second full-length album, The Angie House, on September 27, 2005. The song "Sweet Southern Moon" was featured in a 2007 advertisement campaign for Louisiana-based Abita Brewing Company.

=== Dust (2007–2010) ===
Real Records stepped in to handle their third full-length release, Dust, released on September 18, 2007. Benjy Davis Project was soon signed to Rock Ridge Music in August 2008, and re-released Dust on November 4, 2008. The new release was remixed and included three new songs. Dust was produced by David Z (Prince, Fine Young Cannibals, Jonny Lang, Kenny Wayne Shepherd, Big Head Todd & the Monsters) and was the culmination of all the best creative parts from the band's past. “These sessions were more raw, more real,” Davis said. “David wanted to record us where we were and how we played at that moment in time. And we were introduced to more elements of the arrangement process, the architecture. And we did it in four days, so there was more pressure to perform, in a good way.”

In January 2009, The Benjy Davis Project appeared on The Rock Boat, the live music Caribbean cruise founded and headlined by Rock Ridge Music labelmates Sister Hazel. In July 2009 labelmate Tony Lucca joined their tour as their supporting act.

=== Lost Souls Like Us (2010–2013) ===
Benjy Davis Project released their fourth studio album, Lost Souls Like Us, on March 2, 2010. Lost Souls Like Us was recorded at Rivergate Studios in Hendersonville, TN and was co-produced by Bobby Capps (38 Special) and Jason Spiewak. The album featured the current band line-up of Benjy Davis and Mic Capdevielle. In addition to Davis and Capdevielle, the album featured a cast of seasoned studio musicians: Mark "Sparky" Matejka of Lynyrd Skynyrd, Danny Chauncey of 38 Special and Jason "Slim" Gambill of Lady Antebellum all contributed guitar parts; Ethan Pilzer (Jewel, Big & Rich) played bass; Spiewak and Capps played piano and organ; and Sara Jean Kelley sang background vocals.

Benjy Davis Project toured extensively over the next year in support of Lost Souls Like Us. In January 2011 they released a digital-only album called Sincerely featuring acoustic renditions of several songs from previous albums, as well as a new track called "Crashes". Since February 2011 the band has been on hiatus, citing the need to "clear their heads, re-energize and to allow Davis some time to write new songs".

=== Solo album (2014–present) ===
On January 21, 2014, Benjy Davis released a 10-track, self-titled debut solo album. In 2018, Davis signed a songwriting deal with Big Machine Records. Some of his songs have been recorded by country music artists Rascal Flatts, Chris Young, Jake Owen and Cody Johnson.

== Discography ==
=== Studio albums ===
Year	Album details	Peak chart positions				Certifications (Sales Threshold)
Year	Album details	US	US Rock	US Indie	US Heat	Certifications (Sales Threshold)
2002	More Than Local: Release date: June 11, 2002; Label: Benjy Davis	—	—	—	—	
2005	The Angie House: Release date: September 27, 2005; Label: Bogalusa	—	—	—	—	
2007	Dust: Release date: September 18, 2007; Label: Benjy Davis	—	—	—	—	
2010	Lost Souls Like Us: Release date: March 2, 2010; Label: Rock Ridge Music	—	—	—	—	
"—" denotes releases that did not chart

=== Extended plays (EPs) ===
Year	Album details	Peak chart positions				Certifications (Sales Threshold)
Year	Album details	US	US Rock	US Indie	US Heat	Certifications (Sales Threshold)
2004	The Practice Sessions: Release date: May 4, 2004; Label: Benjy Davis	—	—	—	—	
2007	Limited Edition: Release date: May 22, 2007; Label: Benjy Davis	—	—	—	—	
"—" denotes releases that did not chart

=== Compilations ===
Year	Album details
2010	Paper Trails: Release date: July 12, 2010; Label: Benjy Davis; Released exclusively to Amazon.com as a free download

== Members ==
=== Current members ===
- Benjy Davis - vocals, guitar
- Mic Capdevielle - drums, percussion, vocals

=== Former members ===
- Anthony Rushing - violin, mandolin, vocals
- Brett Bolden - bass
- Jonathan Lawhun - lead guitar, banjo
- Matt Rusnak - bass
- Michael Galasso - piano, B3 organ, wurlitzer, harmonica, vocals
- Patrick Hernandez - guitar, vocals
- Will Leblanc - bass
