= The Angie House =

Studio album by Benjy Davis Project
- Released: September 27, 2005
- Recorded: 2005
- Genre: Southern Rock
- Length: 57:52
- Label: Real Records/Bogalusa Records
- Producer: Gene Foster

Benjy Davis Project chronology
The Practice Sessions (EP) (2004)	The Angie House (2005)	Limited Edition (EP) (2007)

The Angie House is Benjy Davis Project's second studio album. It was released on September 27, 2005. The album was recorded in Bogalusa, Louisiana at Studio in the Country. The album title refers to the small town of Angie, Louisiana where the band lived communally while working on the album. The album's third track, "Do It With The Lights On", became an instant hit throughout the band's collegiate fan base and is often the closing number in their live performances.

== Track listing ==
All songs composed by Benjy Davis.

1. "Wait" - 5:00
2. "Somebody Else" - 5:08
3. "Do It With the Lights On" - 4:31
4. "She Ain't Got Love" - 5:06
5. "214" - 4:07
6. "Crimson Glow" - 6:10
7. "Everybody" - 4:25
8. "Blame It On the Devil" - 5:45
9. "Mighty Arenal" - 4:10
10. "Soul On Fire" - 4:58
11. "Purgatoria" - 4:05
12. "Down and Out" - 4:27

== Personnel ==
- Benjy Davis - Acoustic Guitar, Lead Vocals
- Michael Galasso - Piano, B-3 Organ, Wurlitzer, Background Vocals
- Anthony Rushing - Mandolin, Violin, Background Vocals
- Jonathan Lawhun - Electric Guitar
- Brett Bolden - Bass Guitar
- Mic Capdevielle - Percussion, Drums

== Additional personnel ==
- Clarence "Gatemouth" Brown - Electric Guitar
- Natalie Van Bukleo - Violin
- Tommy Oswald - Violin
- Jennifer Cassin - Viola
- Mira Costa - Cello
- William Grimes - Double Bass
- Bobby Campo - Trumpet
- Barney Floyd - Trumpet
- Chris Belieau - Trombone
- Jerry Jumonville - Tenor and Baritone Sax
