= Dust (Benjy Davis Project album) =

Studio album by Benjy Davis Project
- Released: September 18, 2007 / November 4, 2008
- Recorded: 2007 / 2008 (Additional Material)
- Genre: Southern Rock
- Length: 47:55 (2007) / 50:52 (2008)
- Label: Real Records/Bogalusa Records (2007) / Rock Ridge Music (2008)
- Producer: David Z

Benjy Davis Project chronology
Limited Edition (EP) (2007)	Dust (2007)	Lost Souls Like Us (2010)

Dust is Benjy Davis Project's third studio album. It was released in September 2007. Benjy Davis Project was soon signed to Rock Ridge Music in August 2008, and re-released Dust on November 4, 2008. The new release was remixed and included three new songs. The song "Sweet Southern Moon" was featured in an advertisement campaign for Louisiana-based Abita Brewing Company.

== Track listing ==
All songs were composed by Benjy Davis, except as noted.

2007 Original Release

1. "The Rain" - 4:21
2. "I Love You" (Benjy Davis/Michael Galasso) - 3:38
3. "Sweet Southern Moon" - 3:59
4. "Clowns" (Davis/Galasso) - 4:21
5. "Green And Blue" - 4:26
6. "Good Enough" - 4:27
7. "Prove You Wrong" - 4:32
8. "Whose God?" - 3:51
9. "When I Go Home" - 3:50
10. "Fine With Me" - 4:16
11. "Graves" - 2:56
12. "Over Me" - 3:18

2008 Re-release

1. "The Rain" - 4:21
2. "Still Sweet" - 3:34
3. "Sweet Southern Moon" - 3:59
4. "Tell Myself" - 4:25
5. "Green And Blue" - 4:26
6. "I Love You" (Davis/Galasso) - 3:38
7. "Good Enough" - 4:27
8. "Same Damn Book" - 3:56
9. "Whose God?" - 3:51
10. "Clowns" (Davis/Galasso) - 4:21
11. "When I Go Home" - 3:50
12. "Graves" - 2:56
13. "Over Me" - 3:18

== Personnel ==
- Benjy Davis - Acoustic/Electric Guitar, Lead Vocals
- Mic Capdevielle - Percussion, Drums
- Brett Bolden - Bass Guitar (2007 Original Tracks)
- Michael Galasso - Harmonica, Piano, B3, Wurlitzer, Background Vocals
- Jonathan Lawhun - Electric Lead Guitar, Banjo
- Anthony Rushing - Mandolin, Violin, Background Vocals
- Matt Rusnak - Bass Guitar (2008 Additional Tracks)

== Additional personnel ==
- Maggie Brown - Vocals
