= Patricia Murphy Robinson =

New York black feminist

- Other name: Pat Robinson
- Education: Simmons College; Boston University School of Social Work
- Occupation: Black feminist
- Known for: Creator of the Mount Vernon Women's Group

Patricia Murphy Robinson, also known as Pat Robinson, was a leftist Black feminist who worked primarily in Mount Vernon, New York. She was the creator of the Mount Vernon Women's Group, a feminist group consisting of Black women who were active between the 1960s and '70s.

== Biography ==
Robinson completed her undergraduate studies at Simmons College in Boston, Massachusetts, and went on to her graduate studies at the Boston University School of Social Work. By the 1960s, Robinson was married and was a mother of three children. She worked as both a private psychotherapist and social worker, simultaneously volunteering at Planned Parenthood in Mount Vernon, New York.

== Mount Vernon Women's Group ==
The Mount Vernon Women's Group, also referred to as "New Rochelle women's group", the "Pat Robinson Group", or "the Damned", was started by Robinson in 1960 as a result of her work with Planned Parenthood. The group was made up of a diverse group of Black women that included different ages, professions, and economic status. These were women that Robinson met during her volunteer work with Planned Parenthood, all of whom were interested in social issues that affected their community. Conversations covered a wide array of topics such as welfare, housing, sexism, and birth control.

The Mount Vernon Women's group were outspoken in their support for birth control, understanding contraception as a method for women to regain control over their bodies. This belief was very contrary to the position against birth control that was held by many Black nationalists at the time. In response to growing anti-contraceptive rhetoric being spread by the Black Unity Party, The Mount Vernon Women's group responded with criticism towards Black men for their failure in child rearing, asserting "Poor Black sisters decide for themselves whether to have a baby or not have a baby."

The women's group would continue to publish feminist articles with the help of Robinson. These writings acknowledged and spoke on the unique oppression that Black women face, and criticized the patriarchy and capitalism as systems that work against Black women.

Another branch of the women's group was created in New Rochelle with the help of the Mount Vernon group, consisting of young women. The young women of this group established an organization called "Black Radicals Onward."

== Freedom School ==
In 1966, the group launched a Freedom School hosted in the apartment of Joyce H., a fellow member of the Mount Vernon women's group. The freedom school met on Saturday afternoons and lasted through the 1970s. Deviating from student-teacher power dynamics, children at the school were instead treated as equals. Instead of typical curriculum such as math and English, students at the freedom school were learning about different systems of oppression, as well as ways to navigate them. Many of the children in the freedom school were already in attendance at the Mount Vernon women's group meetings.

== Other activism ==
Robinson was a follower of Malcolm X. She was one of the many people that met with Malcolm X to ask for him to take part in the creation of the Organization of Black Power, to which he declined. In the wake of his death, Robinson helped establish the group "Black Women Enrages" as a means to be of aid to Malcolm X's family. Robinson would eventually leave the group due to ideological differences.

== Bibliography ==
- "Poor Black Women". New England Free Press, 1968
- "A Historical and Critical Essay for Black Women". The Spectator (Bloomington, IN), 1970
- "Letter to a North Vietnamese Sister from an Afro-American Woman", 1968
- Lessons from the Damned: Class Struggle in the Black Community, 1973
