= Riley Etheridge Jr. =

American songwriter

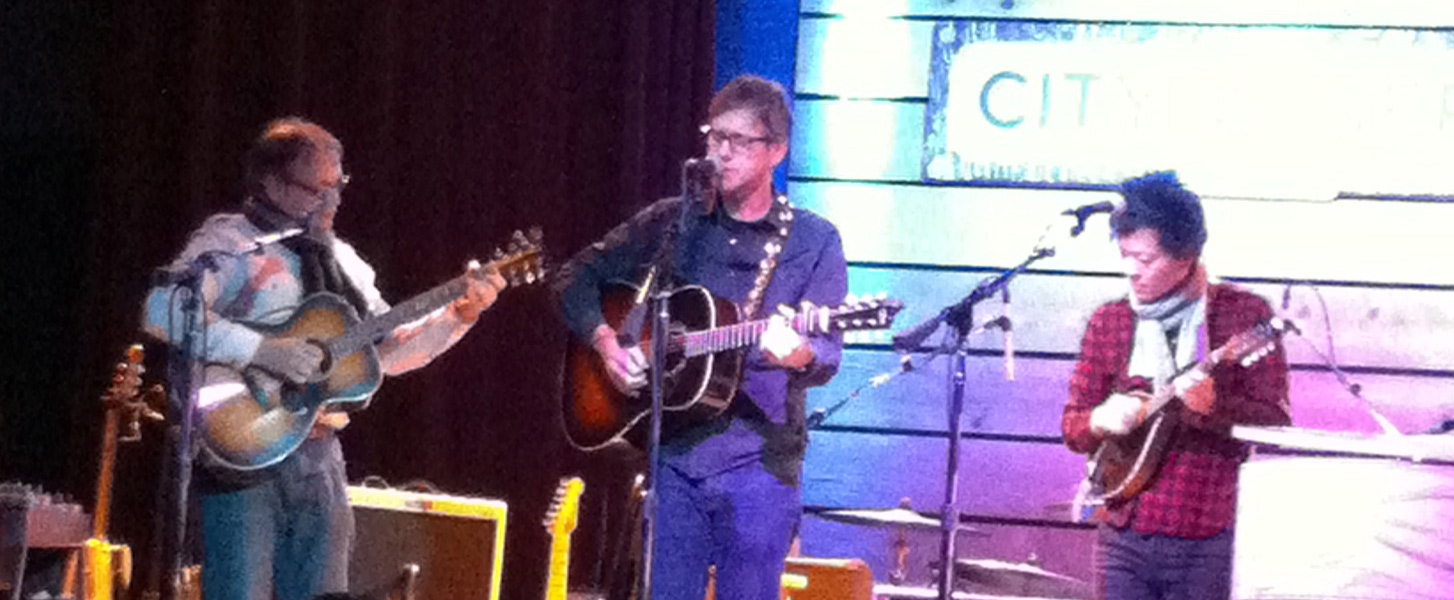
- Riley Etheridge Jr. performing live at City Winery in Nashville, TN.

Background information
- Origin: Columbia, South Carolina
- Genres: Folk rock, Americana (music),
- Labels: Rock Ridge Music
- Website: www.rileyetheridge.com

Riley Etheridge Jr. is an American singer-songwriter. Raised in Columbia, South Carolina, he spent twenty years in Louisiana before moving to New York City, where he lived and performed from 2008-2019. He currently resides in Los Angeles.

== Career ==
Etheridge performed with a series of bands during his 20 years living in Baton Rouge, Louisiana including the country/Cajun group the River City Good Time Band. After moving to NYC in 2008, Etheridge signed to the Rock Ridge Music label.

His 2014 release "The Straight and Narrow Way" was recorded in Los Angeles, New Orleans and Nashville and “features a clash of musical influences, legends and genres.” Upon release, the album was reviewed as having "all the trappings of a classic, a record that might have a one time emerged from the down home environs of Muscle Shoals or Stax Studios" by No Depression Magazine writer Lee Zimmerman.

Etheridge collaborated with a consistent set of artists across projects including Nashville guitarist/producer Wendell Tilley, Shane Theriot (Hall and Oates, Neville Brothers) and New Orleans pianist Larry Sieberth. “The Straight And Narrow Way” includes two duets with Sara Watkins (Nickel Creek) as well as support from guest vocalist Erica Falls (Joe Sample).

Following the 2014 release, Etheridge toured the U.S. as support for Rock and Roll Hall of Fame artist Leon Russell. In August 2014 the band appeared in the 26th edition of the Blues to Bop Festival in Lugano, Switzerland to strong reviews.
