= Tim Halperin =

American musician

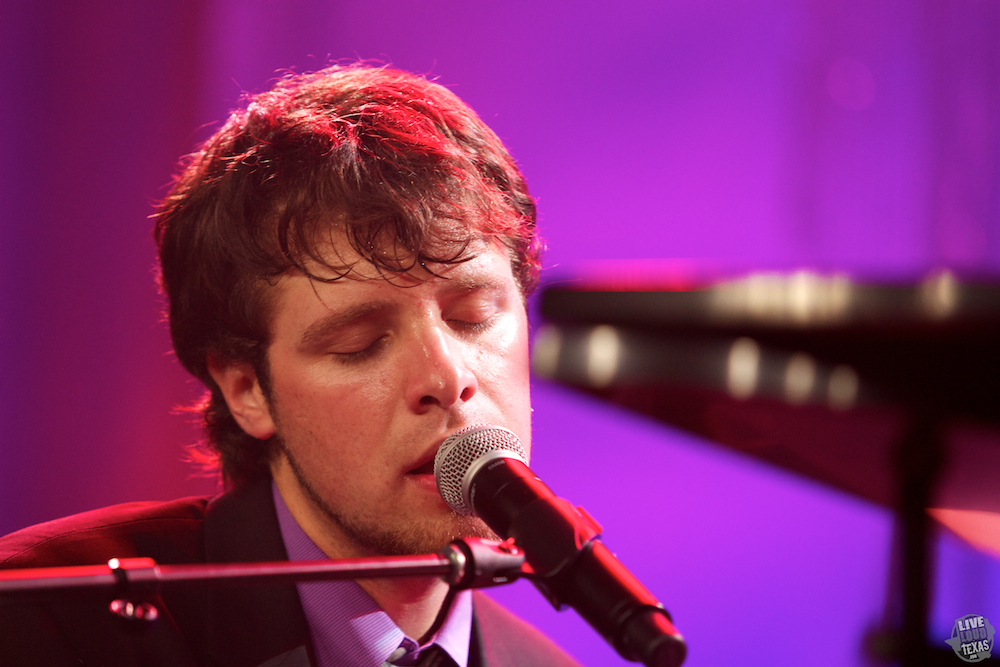

Background information
- Birth name: Timothy Halperin
- Born: May 27, 1987 (age 38)
- Origin: Omaha, Nebraska
- Genres: Pop rock, alternative rock
- Occupations: Singer-songwriter, arranger, musician
- Instruments: Piano, vocals
- Years active: 2007–present
- Labels: 24 Hour Distribution
- Website: Official; Tim Halperin on Facebook

Tim Halperin (born May 27, 1987, in Omaha, Nebraska) is an American singer-songwriter. A piano player and vocalist, in 2007 he began performing and recording, and in 2010 his track "We Fight Back" became the theme song for Susan G. Komen for the Cure. He was a Top 24 American Idol contestant for season 10, and afterwards released his 2011 debut album, Rise and Fall, which peaked at no. 14 on the Billboard Heatseekers Chart. The EP Under that Christmas Spell followed in 2012, and like all his albums since Rise and Fall was released on the 24 Hour Distribution label. Halperin's second album Heart Tells Your Head was released in February 2014 and peaked at No. 21 on the Heatseekers chart.

According to Allmusic, Halperin's style is "a soulful blend of modern and classic pop, which has been favorably compared to everyone from Jason Mraz and The Fray to Ben Folds and Coldplay."

== Early life ==
Tim Halperin was born on May 27, 1987, in Omaha, Nebraska. Exposed to artists such as the Beatles, Simon & Garfunkel, and Billy Joel at a young age, he began taking piano lessons at the age of six. In middle school he began singing on the worship team at his local church, and soon started playing with bands and singing in choir at Westside High School in Omaha. He has stated he didn't write his first serious song until his second year, and has cited Coldplay, The Fray, OneRepublic, Ben Folds, and Elton John as early musical influences.

== Career ==
=== First releases ===
In 2007 he moved to Fort Worth, Texas, to begin attending Texas Christian University. While studying business he continued to pursue songwriting, performing at a school talent show his second year. Encouraged by the response, he began compiling the EP You Are the Moon, which was put on iTunes in the winter of 2007. He released a second EP, Make or Break, in 2009.

For the middle of 2008 he was an intern in human resources at the First National Bank of Omaha, while from May 2009 to January 2011 he was a Wyndham Account Rep at Range Online Media in Fort Worth. In 2010, he graduated from the Neely School of Business in Fort Worth.

After graduating in 2010, he debuted a music video for his single "She Runs," posting it on YouTube that July. Drawing a budget of $500 and volunteers, Shot in one continuous take, the video required building several sets on rolling platforms that move with scenes in the video. It was tweeted by Jimmy Kimmel, covered by New York magazine, and featured in August episode of The Real World and MTVU.

Also in summer 2010, Tim volunteered to write a song for a TCU mentor and breast cancer survivor involved with Susan G. Komen for the Cure. "We Fight Back" became the Komen theme song, frequently featuring in their promotional material, including in commercials associated with Belk, Inc. and General Mills. The song went live on iTunes on October 1, 2010, with all proceeds donated to Komen.

=== American Idol ===
While attending school and working on his debut album in the fall of 2010, Halperin was encouraged by a friend to audition for season 10 of American Idol. A video of his original track "The Last Song" led to a live audition in Los Angeles, where he was selected as one of the final 24 contestants, becoming the first competitor to perform an original song on Idol to qualify for the Top 24. He auditioned in Los Angeles with "She Will Be Loved" by Maroon 5, also performing "Something" by the Beatles as a duet with Julie Zorrilla. His live stage performance at the semi-finals was "Streetcorner Symphony" by Rob Thomas. Hours after his elimination in March 2011 he offered "The Last Song" as a free download, though the track was already in rotation on various radio stations in Omaha.

=== Association with Kidd Kraddick ===
In response to Halperin's elimination, radio personality Kidd Kraddick on 106.1 KISSFM in Dallas, started an "Idol Got It Wrong" campaign. Each week Halperin would learn a song performed by an Idol contestant overnight, then perform it live on KISSFM. Audiences voted for the superior performer, and Halperin was voted best for nine successive weeks. Afterwards, Kraddick continued to invite Halperin to appear on the Kidd Kraddick in the Morning show. According to Halperin, "I would not be where I am today without Kidd Kraddick. He went out on a limb for me after American Idol and never turned back. He believed in my music and in me, and as long as I am around, I will be giving credit to him and stopping at nothing to further the cause of his beloved foundation, Kidd's Kids."

After Kraddick's death in 2013, Halperin recorded and released a version of Ben Folds track "The Luckiest," one of Kraddick's favorite songs. In August 2013 Halperin performed at the first-ever Concert for Kidd's Kids, where he met Ben Folds.

=== Rise and Fall ===
"The Last Song"
Excerpt of Halperin's single "The Last Song"

His debut full-length album, Rise and Fall, was released on September 27, 2011. He had started work on the album over a year earlier, only to put the release date on hold to fulfill his Idol contract. He spent much of 2010 working on the recordings with producer Jordan Critz (The Fray, Third Eye Blind and Lifehouse). According to Halperin, "With this record, because it's my first full-length album, I wanted to make sure that it was the most me. That it had songs on it that I felt like best represented who I am, not only as a songwriter, but as a person."

The album rose to No. 1 on the iTunes Singer-Songwriter Chart, and held that position for 4 days. Rise and Fall also debuted at No. 14 on the Billboard Heatseekers Chart. The CD underwent a second official release on December 6, 2011. The first track on the album, "All You Got," was written for Kidd's Kids, with all proceeds going to the organization.

His first single for Rise and Fall and one of the first tracks recorded for the album, "The Last Song," as of September 26, 2011, was in the top ten on the Singer-Songwriters Songs chart on iTunes. For the music video of "The Last Song" fans donated a budget of $8,000.

=== Under that Christmas Spell ===
In November 2012 he released the EP Under that Christmas Spell, which includes five arrangements of classic songs and the eponymous single written by Halperin. The album's final cover, "I'll Be Home for Christmas," features Hayley Orrantia on vocals. According to Halperin, "Growing up, I worked on a Christmas tree farm for four years. Around Christmas, people in general are more happy and forgiving."

According to a review, "Under That Christmas Spell is a six-song album that intermixes original tunes and classic covers. Halperin reinvented the hymn-like 'Mary Did You Know' by adding cello and redirecting the listener to the lyricism of the song. In his rendition of 'Have Yourself a Merry Little Christmas,' Halperin's sincerity bleeds through as his voice dances over minimalist guitar lines and dainty xylophone."

=== Recent years ===
"Heart Tells Your Head"
Excerpt of "Heart Tells Your Head"

Halperin contributed vocals to the album Under Fire by Green River Ordinance, and his track "Let It Go" was used on the compilation album Salvation City Hope Compilation CD , which funded the distribution of suicide prevention resources in schools. He continues to perform and record in the United States, chiefly Dallas/Fort Worth, Nashville and Los Angeles. He has opened for Lee Ann Womack, The Fray, and Kelly Clarkson.

In June 2012, OurStage hosted the first Band Against Bullying live concert event. The "Band Against Bullying" Competition to find an artist to add to the lineup was awarded to Halperin. The concert was held on July 20, 2012, at the B.B. King Blues Club in Times Square, New York City.

Since Rise and Fall, his albums have been released on 24 Hour Distribution. Heart Tells Your Head is the second full-length studio album by Halperin. Released on February 11, 2014, it peaked at 21 on the Billboard Top Heatseekers chart.

Tim Halperin and Writer/Producer Billy Van formed indie project Boundary Run.

== Personal life ==
Halperin is the youngest of three boys. Halperin became a Christian at a young age. He continues to be involved in church and Young Life ministries.

On April 1, 2014, Halperin proposed to his girlfriend, Kylie. They are now married and live outside of Nashville.

== Discography ==
=== Albums ===
Albums by Tim Halperin
Year	Album title	Chart peaks			Release details
Year	Album title	Heat	—	—	Release details
2011	Rise and Fall	14	—	—	Released: September 27, 2011; Label: 24 Hour Distribution; Format: CD, digital
2014	Heart Tells Your Head	21	—	—	Released: February 11, 2014; Label: 24 Hour Distribution; Format: CD, digital
"—" denotes a recording that did not chart or was not released in that territory.

=== EPs ===
EPs by Tim Halperin
Year	Album title	Release details
2008	You Are The Moon	Released: 2008; Label: self-released; Format: CD, digital
2009	Make Or Break	Released: 2009; Label: self-released; Format: CD, digital
2012	Under that Christmas Spell	Released: Nov 2011; Label: 24 Hour Distribution; Format: CD, digital
2015	Searching for the Same Thing	Released: Aug 2015; Label: Format: Digital
2017	Forever Starts Today	Released: Sep 2017; Label: self-released; Format: digital

=== Singles ===
Selected songs by Tim Halperin
Year	Title	Charts		Album	Label
Year	Title	—	—	Album	Label
2010	"We Fight Back"	—	—	N/A	Komen Foundation
2010	"Let It Go"	—	—	Hope Compilation	Salvation City
2011	"The Last Song"	—	—	Rise and Fall	24 Hour Distribution
2011	"Under that Christmas Spell"	—	—	Under that Christmas Spell	24 Hour Distribution
2014	"Heart Tells Your Head"	—	—	Heart Tells Your Head	24 Hour Distribution

=== Music videos ===
- 2010: "She Runs"
- 2011: "The Last Song"

=== Guest appearances ===
Selected songs featuring Tim Halperin
Year	Single name	Primary artist(s)	Album	Role
2012	(multiple tracks)	Green River Ordinance	Under Fire	Vocals
2014	"Chase" (ft. Tim Halperin)	Tedashii	Below Paradise	Vocals
