= More Than Local =

Studio album by Benjy Davis Project
- Released: June 11, 2002
- Recorded: 2002
- Genre: Southern Rock
- Length: 52:33
- Label: Real Records/Bogalusa Records
- Producers: Trey Merrill & Pat Robinson

Benjy Davis Project chronology
More Than Local (2002)	The Practice Sessions (EP) (2004)

More Than Local is Benjy Davis Project's debut album. It was released on June 11, 2002. It included songs that became staples of the band's live shows, including "The Day That I Die" and "Louisiana Saturday Night".

== Track listing ==
All songs composed by Benjy Davis except as noted.

1. "More Than Local" – 3:27
2. "The Day That I Die" - 3:19
3. "Louisiana Saturday Night" - 3:13
4. "Humble Hand" - 3:40
5. "Glory Glory" - 3:42
6. "No More Pills" - 3:49
7. "Interlude" (Benjy Davis/Chris Spinosa) - 2:28
8. "Heaven Never Seemed So Small" - 4:14
9. "Cajun Crawfish Boil" - 3:16
10. "Where My Ass Is" - 3:53
11. "Where The Heart Is" - 4:11
12. "To Your Door" - 3:39
13. "I Don't Mind" - 2:07
14. "Never Go Away" - 4:21
15. "Sleep Sweetly" - 3:14

== Personnel ==
- Benjy Davis - Acoustic Guitar, Lead Vocals
- Brett Bolden - Bass Guitar
- Mic Capdevielle - Drums
- Michael Galasso - Background Vocals
- Anthony Rushing - Background Vocals
- Chris Spinosa - Electric Guitar

== Additional personnel ==
- Clarence "Gatemouth" Brown - Lead Guitar (track 3), Fiddle (track 9)
- Susan Cowsill - Background Vocals (track 3, 5, 12)
- Paul Sanchez - Lead Guitar
- Darrell Brown - Hammond B-3
- David Peters - Percussion, Rain Stick, Shakers, Triangle
- Pat Robinson - Electric Guitar, Harmonica, Background Vocals
