= Ernie Halter =

American singer/songwriter (born 1974)

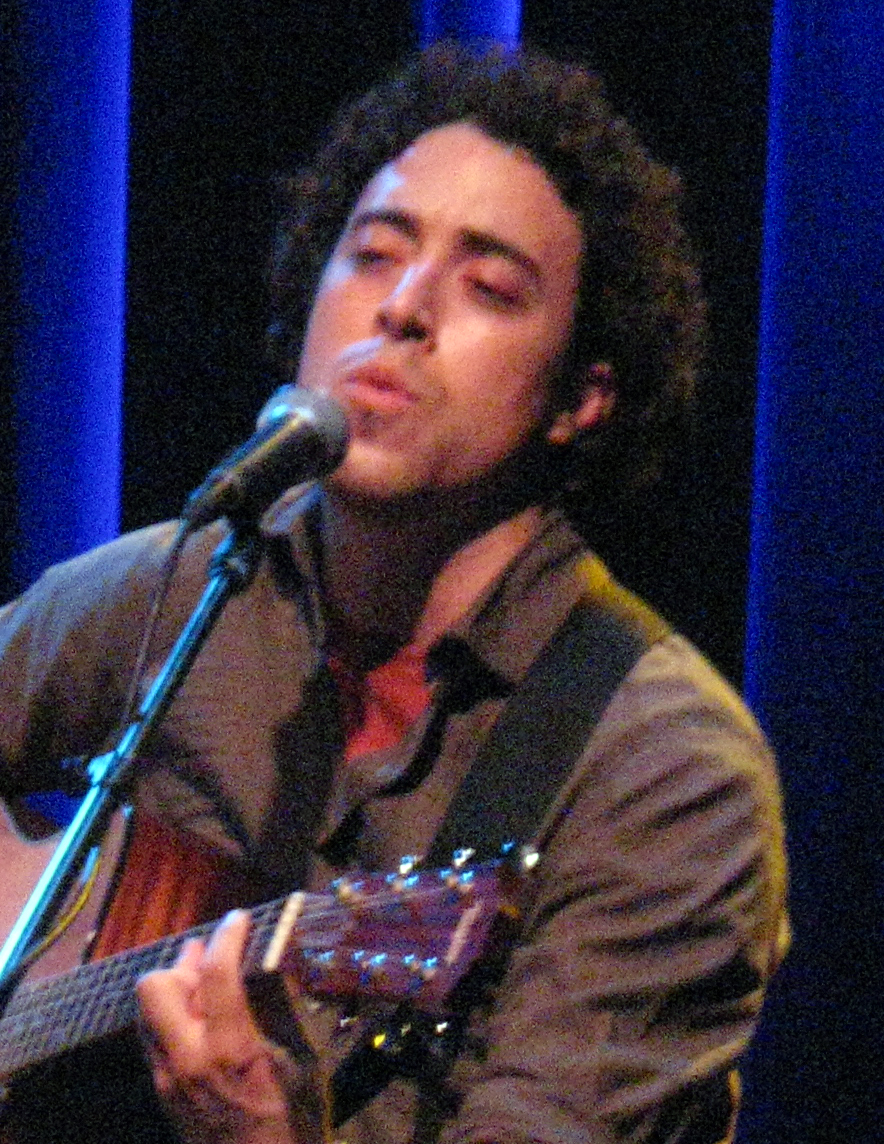
- Ernie Halter live in concert, 2008

Background information
- Origin: Los Angeles, California, United States
- Genres: Singer/songwriter
- Years active: 2005–present
- Labels: none
- Spouse: Kristen Halter
- Website: www.erniehalter.com

Ernie Halter is an American singer/songwriter, also known as the "Cuboslavian". He was signed to Rock Ridge Music.

Born in Inglewood, CA in 1974 and raised in Orange County, Halter started playing piano when he was 8, guitar when he was 14, and writing his own songs when he was 16. His first disc Lo-Fidelity came out in 2005, followed by Congress Hotel in 2007. Halter's music is mainly influenced by artists such as Beatles, Otis Redding, Stevie Wonder and The Go-Go's.

Burial sampled from Halter's song 'Whisper' in his 2007 album Untrue. Justin Bieber covered Halter's song "Come Home to Me" in 2011.

He toured through much of the United States.

== Discography ==
=== Albums ===
- Lo Fidelity (2005, self-released)
- Congress Hotel (2007, Rock Ridge Music)
- Christmas (2008, Bendit)
- Starting Over (2008, Rock Ridge Music)
- Ernie Halter: Live (2009, Rock Ridge Music)
- Franklin & Vermont (2010, Rock Ridge Music)
- Labor of Love (2013, self-released)
- Catbird Soul (2019, self-released)

=== EPs ===
- 4U (2010, Rock Ridge Music)
