= Rock Ridge Music discography =

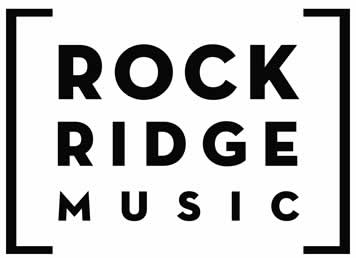
- Studio albums: +50
- Live albums: +1
- Compilation albums: +1

The following is a list of releases by Rock Ridge Music, an independent music label in Nashville, TN. Founded in 2004, it has signed, managed, and/or promoted artists including Reel Big Fish, Sister Hazel, Rachel Platten, Attack! Attack! UK, The Ike Reilly Assassination, Fiction Family and The Damnwells.

== Catalog ==
Artist	Title	Year	Notes
Steve Forbert	Compromised	2015	
Ike Reilly	Born On Fire	2015	
The Damnwells	self-titled	2015	
Folk Family Revival	Waterwalker	2015	
Humming House	Revelries	2015	
Reel Big Fish	Happy Skalidays	2014	
Psychostick	IV: Revenge Of The Vengeance	2014	
Sister Hazel	20 Stages	2014	
Melodime	Where The Saints & The Sinners Collide (Deluxe)	2014	
Levi Weaver	Your Ghost Keeps Finding Me	2014	
Riley Etheridge Jr.	The Straight And Narrow Way	2014	
Charlie Oxford	Charlie Oxford	2014	
Runaway Dorothy	The Wait	2014	
DoryDrive	Here's To You	2014	
Grace & Tony	November	2013	
Strange Daze	Shine Through	2013	
Suburban Legends	Dreams Aren't Real But These Songs Are	2013	
JD Eicher & The Goodnights	Into Place	2013	
Aaron & The Spell	Sing	2013	
Daniel Kirkpatrick and the Bayonets	Alibis	2013	
Transitshop	Velocity	2013	
Russell Howard	City Heart+	2013	
Sarah Miles	One	2013	
Bracher Brown	Broken Glass and Railroad Tracks	2013	
Krief	Hundred Thousand Pieces	2013	
The Revere	The Great City	2013	
Fiction Family	Fiction Family Reunion	2013	
Ernie Halter	Hi Fidelity	2012	
Nick Gill	Waves Are Only Water	2012	
Jerad Finck	Stuck In Your Riddle	2012	
Riley Etheridge, Jr.	The Arrogance of Youth	2012	
Ingram Hill	Ingram Hill	2012	
Reel Big Fish	Candy Coated Fury	2012	#80 on the Billboard 200 in 2012
Ryan Humbert	Sometimes The Game Plays You	2012	
Attaloss	Attaloss	2012	
The Explorers Club	Grand Hotel	2012	
Riley Etheridge, Jr.	Better Days	2012	
Reel Big Fish	Skacoustic	2011	
Lights Resolve	Feel You're Different	2011	
Tony Lucca	Under The Influence	2011	
Psychostick	Space Vampires Vs. Zombie Dinosaurs In 3-D	2011	
TFDI	When I Stop Running	2011	
Reel Big Fish	A Best Of Us For The Rest Of Us (Bigger Better Bonus Deluxe Version)	2011	
Attack! Attack! UK	The Latest Fashion	2011	
Ingram Hill	Blue Room Afternoon	2011	
The Revere	Ashia	2011	
Rachel Platten	Be Here	2011	#21 on the Billboard Adult Top 40 in 2011
Jerad Finck	Jerad Finck	2011	
Riley Etheridge, Jr.	Powder Keg	2011	
Reel Big Fish	The Best Of Us For The Rest Of Us	2011	
Benjy Davis Project	Sincerely	2011	
Sister Hazel	Heartland Highway	2010	
Ingram Hill	Look Your Best	2010	
Tony Lucca	Rendezvous With The Angels	2010	
Ernie Halter	Franklin & Vermont	2010	
Benjy Davis Project	Lost Souls Like Us	2010	
The Ike Reilly Assassination	Hard Luck Stories	2010	
Evacuate Chicago	Veracity	2010	
7daybinge	7daybinge	2010	
Bernie Williams	Moving Forward	2009	#1 on the Jazz Radio chart, twice in 2010
Rescue Signals	Indecisions	2009	
Ernie Halter	Live	2009	
Sister Hazel	Release	2009	
Reel Big Fish	Live! In Concert!	2009	
Psychostick	Sandwich	2009	
Autumn Hour	Dethroned	2009	
EvansCapps	Last Time	2009	
Reel Big Fish	Fame, Fortune and Fornication	2009	
Cherry Poppin' Daddies	Skaboy JFK	2009	
Cherry Poppin' Daddies	Susquehanna	2009	Re-issue of original 2008 release on Space Age Bachelor Pad Records
Ken Block	Drift	2008	
Benjy Davis Project	Dust	2008	
Attack! Attack! UK	Attack! Attack! UK	2008	
Ernie Halter	Starting Over	2008	
Sister Hazel	Before The Amplifiers...Live Acoustic	2008	
Rob Gee	Says	2008	
The Ike Reilly Assassination	Poison the Hit Parade	2008	
Rob Gee	Rob Gee	2007	
Travis Mitchell Band	Waiting On Tomorrow	2007	
Sister Hazel	Santa's Playlist	2007	
Psychostick	The Flesh Eating Rollerskate Holiday Joyride	2007	
Chris Volz	Redemption	2007	
Reel Big Fish	Monkeys for Nothin' and the Chimps for Free	2007	
Stroke 9	The Last Of The International Playboys	2007	
Sister Hazel	Bam! Volume 1	2007	
The Accident Experiment	Arena	2007	
The Ike Reilly Assassination	We Belong to the Staggering Evening	2007	
Ernie Halter	Congress Hotel	2007	
Kittie	Never Again EP	2006	Released exclusively on digital storefronts.
Tony Lucca	Live In Hollywood	2006	
Sister Hazel	Absolutely	2006	
Five.Bolt.Main	Complete	2006	"The Gift" reached #42 on Mediabase Active Rock chart on 3/28/06, #47 on R&R on 4/7/06
Travis Mitchell Band	Forget What's Wrong	2006	
Psychostick	We Couldn't Think Of A Title	2006	Track "BEER!!!" reached #37 on the Mediabase Mainstream Rock chart on 10/6/06, and #44 on the Mediabase Active Rock chart on 2/11/07
Tony Lucca	Canyon Songs	2006	
Five.Bolt.Main	Live	2006	
Boy Hits Car	The Passage	2006	
Tony Lucca	Through The Cracks EP	2006	
Six Ounce Gloves	Timing Is Everything	2006	
The Accident Experiment	United We Fear	2006	
The Ike Reilly Assassination	The Last Demonstration	2006	
Domeshots	Reception	2006	
Northwest Royale	Home Is Where The Hate Is	2006	
Stroke 9	Cafe Cuts (A Collection Of Acoustic Favorites)	2006	
Five.Bolt.Main	Venting	2005	
Scars of Life	What We Reflect	2005	
The Ike Reilly Assassination	Junkie Faithful	2005	
The Ike Reilly Assassination	The B-Sides	2005	
Sister Hazel	Sister Hazel	2005	
Sister Hazel	Lift: Acoustic Renditions	2005	
Stroke 9	All In	2004	
The Ike Reilly Assassination	Sparkle In The Finish	2004	
Domeshots	Domeshots	2004	
Sister Hazel	Lift	2004	
Drew Copeland	No Regrets	2004	
Sister Hazel	Live (Live)	2004	
Sister Hazel	A Life In The Day	2004	
Sister Hazel	Chasing Daylight	2003	

== See also ==
- Category:Rock Ridge Music albums
