= Psychostick discography =

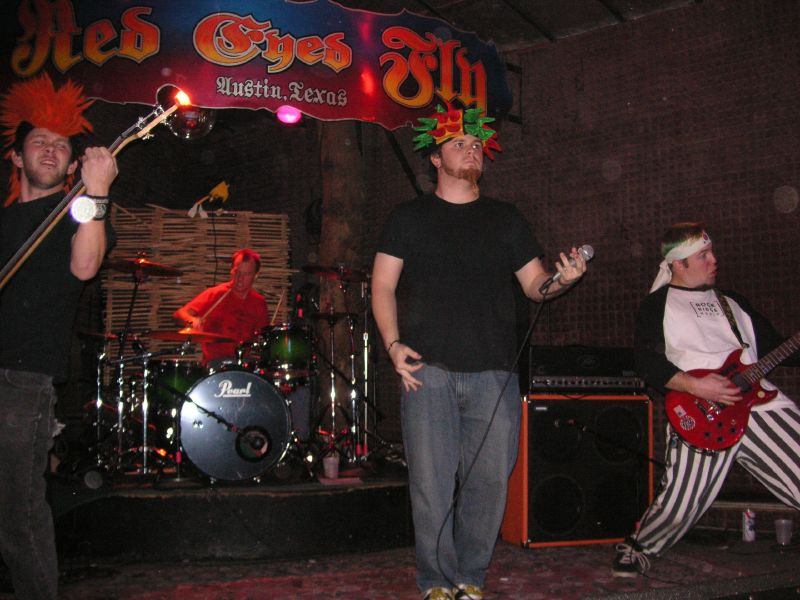
- Studio albums: 5
- Extended plays: 3
- Singles: 12
- Video albums: 1
- Music videos: 7
- Demos: 2

The following is the complete discography of official releases by Psychostick. Psychostick is a comedic metal band from Arizona formed in 2000, currently consisting of Rob "Rawrb" Kersey (lead vocals), Josh "The J" Key (guitar/vocals), Alex "Shmalex" Dontre (drums), and Matty J "Poolemoose" Rzemyk (bass/vocals). Kersey, Key, and Dontre are the band's only constant members, being in the band since its conception. The band has released two demos, five studio albums, three EPs, one DVD, seven music videos, and twelve singles.

== Albums ==
=== Studio albums ===
Year	Album details	Peak chart positions									
Year	Album details	Top Heatseekers	Top Heatseekers (West North Central)	Top Heatseekers East North Central	Top Heatseekers Northeast	Top Heatseekers Mountain	Top Internet	Top Independent	Top Comedy Albums	Rock Albums	Hard Rock Albums
2003	We Couldn't Think of a Title: Released: May 16, 2003; Label: Rock Ridge Music; Format: CD, digital download	41	4	—	—	—	48	—	—	—	—
2009	Sandwich: Released: May 5, 2009; Label: Rock Ridge Music; Format: CD, digital download	15	5	—	—	8	22	41	—	—	—
2011	Space Vampires vs Zombie Dinosaurs in 3D: Released: August 16, 2011; Label: Rock Ridge Music; Format: CD, digital download	12	10	4	10	—	—	45	—	—	10
2014	IV: Revenge of the Vengeance: Released: November 4, 2014; Label: Rock Ridge Music; Format: CD, digital download	—	—	—	—	—	—	—	—	—	—
2018	Do: Released: July 24, 2018; Label: Independent; Format: CD, digital download	9	6	6	—	7	—	39	1	39	14
"—" denotes releases that did not chart or were not released in that country.

=== Compilations ===
Year	Album details	Peak chart positions									
Year	Album details	Top Heatseekers	Top Heatseekers (West North Central)	Top Heatseekers East North Central	Top Heatseekers Northeast	Top Heatseekers Mountain	Top Internet	Top Independent	Top Comedy Albums	Rock Albums	Hard Rock Albums
2022	... and Stuff: Released: April 14, 2022; Label: Independent; Format: CD, digital download	—	—	—	—	—	—	—	—	—	—
"—" denotes releases that did not chart or were not released in that country.

=== Extended plays ===
Year	Album details	Peak chart positions	Certifications (sales thresholds)
Year	Album details	Holiday Albums	Certifications (sales thresholds)
2003	The Best Sampler Ever! (for some reason): Released: 2003; Label: Rock Ridge Music; CD; Released to promote CD release of We Couldn't Think of a Title	—	—
2007	The Flesh Eating Roller Skate Holiday Joyride: Released: September 25, 2007; Label: Rock Ridge Music; Format: CD, digital download	18	—
2010	The Digital Appetizer: Released: May 11, 2010; Label: Rock Ridge Music; Format: Digital download	—	—
"—" denotes releases that did not chart or were not released in that country.

=== Demos ===
Year	Album details
2000	Don't Bitch, It's Free!: Released: 2000
2001	Die...A Lot!: Released: 2001

== Singles ==
Year	Title	Chart positions		Album
Year	Title	^{XM Radio's Liquid Metal}	^{CMJ Loud Rock Select Singles}	Album
2006	"BEER!"	1	-	We Couldn't Think of a Title
2006	"Two Ton Paperweight"	-	-	We Couldn't Think of a Title
2007	"Jolly Old Sadist"	-	-	The Flesh Eating Roller Skate Holiday Joyride
2007	"Jingle Bell Metal" / "Silent Night"	-	-	The Flesh Eating Roller Skate Holiday Joyride
2009	"This is Not a Song, It's a Sandwich!"	-	-	Sandwich
2009	"Girl Directions"	-	-	Sandwich
2009	"You've Got Mail Enhancement"	-	-	Sandwich
2009	"Passive Vengeance"	-	40	Sandwich
2009	"Shower"	-	-	Sandwich
2011	"Political Bum"	-	-	Space Vampires VS Zombie Dinosaurs in 3D
2011	"Because Boobs"	-	-	Space Vampires VS Zombie Dinosaurs in 3D
2012	"Orgasm = Love" (Live-ish Metal as F*ck Version)	-	-	Non-album single
2013	"Dogs Like Socks"	-	-	Revenge of the Vengeance
2013	"Obey the Beard"	-	-	Revenge of the Vengeance
2015	"The Doom Song" Cover	-	-	Non-album single
2017	"Adulting"			DO
2018	"From the Heart (I Hate You)"	-	-	Do
2018	"DO"			Do

== Videography ==
=== Video albums ===
Year	Album details
2009	Psychostick: The Birthening: Released: April 14, 2009; Label: Pluh.com Entertainment; Format: 2DVD

=== Music videos ===
Year	Title	Director(s)	Album
2003	"Pluh"	Rawrb Kersey	We Couldn't Think of a Title
2006	"BEER!"	Macromedia	We Couldn't Think of a Title
2006	"ABCDEath"	Macromedia	We Couldn't Think of a Title
2009	"Girl Directions"	Patrick R. Murphy	Sandwich
2009	"Caffeine"	Patrick R. Murphy	Sandwich
2010	"Do You Want a Taco?"	Patrick R. Murphy	Sandwich
2011	"Because Boobs"	Patrick R. Murphy	Space Vampires VS Zombie Dinosaurs in 3D
2012	"Orgasm = Love" (Live-ish Metal as F*ck Version)	Patrick R. Murphy	
2012	"Political Bum"	Patrick R. Murphy	Space Vampires VS Zombie Dinosaurs in 3D
2013	"Dogs Like Socks"	Patrick R. Murphy	Revenge of the Vengeance
2013	"Sadface :("	Patrick R. Murphy	Space Vampires VS Zombie Dinosaurs in 3D
2014	"Obey the Beard"	Patrick R. Murphy	Revenge of the Vengeance
2015	"Danger Zone"	Patrick R. Murphy	Revenge of the Vengeance
2015	"Bruce Campbell"	Patrick R. Murphy	Revenge of the Vengeance
2015	"Oh Tannenbaum"	Patrick R. Murphy	
2016	"SO. HEAVY."	Patrick R. Murphy	Revenge of the Vengeance
2016	"Megaman"	Patrick R. Murphy	
2016	"N.O.E.L."	Patrick R. Murphy	
2017	"AWESOME!"	Patrick R. Murphy	Revenge of the Vengeance
2017	"Bacon, Egg & Cheese on Toast with Sriracha"	Patrick R. Murphy	DO
2017	"Adulting"	Patrick R. Murphy	DO
2017	"Give Thanks or Die"	Patrick R. Murphy	
2018	"From the Heart"	Patrick R. Murphy	DO
2018	"DO"	Patrick R. Murphy	DO
2019	"Rent in Peace"	Patrick R. Murphy	DO
