= Flaw (band) =

American nu metal band

- Also known as: F.law
- Origin: Louisville, Kentucky, U.S.
- Genres: Nu metal; alternative metal; hard rock
- Years active: 1996–2004; 2006–present
- Labels: Universal; Republic; Uptown; Pavement; Cleopatra
- Members: Chris Volz; Chris Marple; Stacey Brooks Muliford; Jason Proctor
- Past members: See below
- Website: flawband.com

Flaw is an American nu metal band from Louisville, Kentucky, formed by guitarist Jason Daunt in 1996. After a string of rough independent recordings in the 1990s, the band signed to Republic and Universal Music Group and released two major label albums, Through the Eyes in 2001 and Endangered Species in 2004. Breakups, line-up changes, and internal strife plagued the band for the rest of the decade, though from 2015 to 2017, the band reformed with three of their core members to tour and write music. The band released their third studio album, Divided We Fall, in 2016, and a fourth studio album, Vol IV: Because of the Brave in 2019. An album of cover songs, Revival, was later released in 2022. The band's lineup frequently shifts, with lead vocalist Chris Volz being the only constant member.

== History ==
=== Formation and early independent releases (1996–2000) ===
Flaw was formed in 1996 when lead vocalist Chris Volz answered an ad in a local paper placed by guitarist Jason Daunt, who was looking for a lead vocalist for his band. Volz met with Daunt shortly after, with Volz bringing a demo tape containing some examples of his recorded vocals. The meeting went well, with the two starting the writing process for Flaw material that night. They completed their first song, "Inner Strength", the next day.

The band's rhythm section progressed through several lineups but solidified with the addition of bassist Ryan Jurhs in 1997. That same year, the band recorded their first release, the independent American Arrogance. Because they were low on money, the band ordered everything they needed to record from the Musician's Friend catalog, then returned it using the 30-day return policy. Their album gave them the opportunity to open for acts including Fear Factory and Econoline Crush. A local radio station, The Fox, broadcast the songs from Flaw's indie disc, giving them further publicity. Two more independent releases, 1998's self-titled album Flaw and 2000's Drama EP, were later produced as well, while the band's first stable lineup, including Lance Arny as a second guitarist, and Chris Ballinger on drums, was established in 1999.

=== Through the Eyes and Endangered Species (2001–2004) ===
Flaw showcased at CBGB in New York City and were heard by Republic and Universal Music Group. Flaw signed to the label in 2000, and began recording their first studio album in early 2001 at Sound City with music producer David Bottrill. The finished product, Through the Eyes, released in October 2001. The album topped the Billboard Top Heatseekers chart, and peaked at No. 119 on the Billboard 200 chart. In promotion of the album, the band released two singles, "Payback" and "Whole", and played the 2002 iteration of Ozzfest. Another track, "Only the Strong," was also featured on The Scorpion King soundtrack.

In 2004, Flaw returned to the studio to begin recording their second studio album, Endangered Species. The band had parted ways with Daunt and Ballinger and added a replacement drummer, Micah Havertape. The band stated that Daunt was fired due to "personal and creative differences", including issues with undisclosed physical violence. The band continued on as a four-piece, finding it easier to manage the band's internal issues and creative process with fewer members. The album, released in May 2004, debuted at No. 42 on the Billboard 200, selling 27,527 copies in its first week. The album spawned one single, "Recognize", which peaked at No. 25 on the Billboard Mainstream Rock chart. The band toured some in promotion of the album, though a later tour with Ill Niño and Drowning Pool was cancelled due to problems with the tour's promoters. Both albums were deemed commercial disappointments by their record label, Universal Music Group. Flaw was subsequently dropped from Universal in late 2004 and eventually broke up.

=== Breakups, side-projects, and internal strife (2005–2012) ===
After the band broke up, the band members moved onto new projects. Most notably, Volz, formed Five.Bolt.Main with drummer Ivan Arnold, who was one of the rotating members during Flaw's early independent years. They signed with Rock Ridge Records and released a studio album Venting, in 2005, before breaking up. Flaw reformed again in late 2006, with core members Volz, Daunt, and Ballinger. The band played a reunion show in March 2007, playing a previously unreleased track entitled "Do You Remember", and toured through April of the same years with a lineup of Volz, Daunt, Arny, Ballinger, and new bassist Van Avery.

While the band initially had intentions on recording new material and releasing it, internal issues among members lead to many delays and hurdles. Progress slowed as Volz's focus turned to his solo work, recording and touring in support of his studio album Redemption across September and October 2007. Additional complications occurred by the start of 2008, with Volz and Daunt breaking off to form a new band called Foundation. The offshoot played a number of shows through 2008, but eventually returned to just performing as Flaw, as people became confused between the two considering the similar members and setlists. Still, the band continued to struggle with lineup changes, including short term stints with guitarist Nathan McDaniel, bassist Jimmie Stalings, and drummer Terry Harper.

By January 2009, the band had reconvened its efforts to record a new album and attract label support. While the band failed to find label support, in November 2009, they still released a third studio album, completely independently, titled Home Grown Studio Sessions. The lineup included Volz, Arny, Juhrs, and two more newcomers, Andy Russ on guitar and Sean Rued on drums. The band toured in support of the album through the rest of the year, though the album did not sell well, with even Arny conceding that "a lot of people don't know it's out yet" 9 months after its release. The band continued to tour into 2010, with Chris Marple filling in on bass and guitar as the band needed replacements to the lineup. The band played shows with Tantric, Burn Halo, and Adema in September 2010. However, by the end of the year, internal conflict had again led to the cancellation of shows and inactivity within the band.

=== Divided We Fall (2013–2016) ===
On July 16, 2013, it was announced that the band had reformed, and returned to the Through The Eyes line-up of Jason Daunt, Chris Volz, Lance Arny, Ryan Jurhs and Chris Ballinger. The band was reforming to both tour, and record a new studio album. By February 2014, the band announced they had demoed 14 to 15 new songs, 3 of which were updated versions of older songs. Despite the progress, the band needed to procure more funds to continue. In July, Flaw started an Indiegogo campaign to raise money for a full US tour with a new album to be released sometime in 2015, but only acquired 1/4 of the requested funds. Additionally, in September, Arny left the band due to internal conflicts with the rest of the members, The touring continued despite this, playing the "Louder Than Life" festival in October 2014 in Louisville, Kentucky, with Korn, Limp Bizkit and Papa Roach. In December, Ballinger was fired due to "personal and creative differences". The band replaced only Ballinger, with new drummer Corey Sturgill, and opted to once again work as a quartet.

In March 2015, Volz announced that the band had been spending the last few months in the studio working with music producer Skidd Mills on their fourth studio album. He also announced they would be doing "The Reawakening Tour" along with Seasons After between May and June and would then release their next studio album sometime afterward. In April 2015, a new song titled "Bleed Red" was released exclusively to SirusXM Octane to test-market new material in hopes to gain a broader appeal and a wide release. As of March 2015, Volz estimated a late 2015 release for the album. In September 2015, Daunt stated that the album was completely written, so the band was focusing on finding record label backing again. At an October concert, the band stated that the new album's release period had now shifted to the first quarter of 2016. In November 2015, it was announced that the band had signed to Pavement Entertainment with plans on releasing their fourth studio album on April 29, 2016.

After further delays, Divided We Fall was released on August 19, 2016, with the single "Live and Breathe" released the month prior. To promote the album, the band participated in a reunion tour with Dope and Motograter. The band also released an EP of b-sides from the album, United We Stand, on September 1, 2017. The band continued to tour in support of the releases, but also continued to change its touring line up. Jurhs and Sturghil left in December 2016 and were replaced by Tommy Gibbons on guitar, Jeff Dickie on bass, and Skylar Martin on drums. In February 2017, Martin left and was replaced by Dan Johnson, prior touring drummer of Red.

=== Vol IV: Because of the Brave, internal strife, and member changes (2017–present) ===
In November 2017, Daunt announced that he was again leaving the band he had originally founded, citing Volz's drinking and behavior, which he felt was creating too much turnover in band and touring membership, a claim Volz denied. Daunt announced he was starting a new band, "Scars of the Unbroken", with prior Flaw members Jurhs, Gibbons and Sturgill, while Volz announced he had begun writing material for a future Flaw album to be released in 2018.

In March 2018, the band and their crowd funding campaign for a new tour van became the subject of a running joke on The Late Show with Stephen Colbert, culminating in the band's appearance on the show in July 2018, in which Stephen Colbert presented them with a used tour van. The band also shot a music video during their appearance for their single "Conquer This Climb" featuring Colbert off of their upcoming Vol. IV album.

Vol IV: Because of the Brave was released on July 19, 2019. However, the band was accused of plagiarism by YouTube musician Douglas Patrick, who claimed that the band stole his "music melody and structure" from one of his instrumental tracks to use for the song "Wake Up", which is featured in the album. Patrick threatened to pursue legal action against the band. Volz responded to the allegations, claiming that he was unaware of the plagiarism, stating that he only writes lyrics to the music the rest of the band present to him and that it was the work of another member of the band that he didn't name at the time who "royally screwed up" before claiming that he was "upset" over the matter and had reached out to Patrick to offer compensation. However, more songs on the album were discovered to have allegedly been lifted from other YouTubers, including Patrick. It was also discovered that the music for the song "Conquer This Climb" was purchased by the band from another metal YouTuber known as Riff Master T.

In October 2019, bassist Tommy Gibbons admitted that he was the one responsible for the plagiarism after an old social media post from back in August revealed that he was bragging when YouTube metal musicians were learning to play a song that he claimed to have written, which would later be discovered to have been stolen directly from Patrick. In a statement that he posted on social media, Gibbons stated that he takes "full and all" responsibility for his actions and that none of the other band members were involved in the plagiarism. On October 6, 2019, Volz announced on social media that the band had parted ways with Gibbons. On January 11, 2020, Joshua Skellett and Ethan York (formerly of Cold) joined Flaw as the bassist and drummer respectively. Georges departed the band to focus on his MMA career.

In March 2021, multiple publications reported that Volz had repeatedly used racial slurs at a concert, leading to him being dropped by the record label that distributes his side project and solo albums.

In July 2024, as posted by their Facebook post that the band has undergone a line-up change, as guitarist Chris Marple rejoins for the first time since 2012, while guitarist Chuck Wepfer (from Blacktop Mojo) and bassist Myke Akers (from Apex Aura) had also joined.

On August 11, 2024, the band took to their Facebook page and announced that Myke Akers had been fired from the band for undisclosed reasons and that they would be canceling their upcoming performances. Brian Carter (from DeadHorseTrauma & Scream at the Sky) was announced as their new bass player on August 22, 2024.

On February 12, 2025, the band released a statement that drummer James Kyle Adkins had been fired after making hateful Facebook posts towards law enforcement. In the same statement it was revealed that Adema drummer Kris Kohls would accompany them on their upcoming tour and that a permanent drummer would play on their upcoming album and subsequent tours.

On February 24, 2025, Brian Carter announced his departure from the band on his Facebook account.

In 2026, they are expected to release a new album, and they toured at the Sonic Temple Festival in Columbus.

On September 4, a 25th anniversary edition of Through the Eyes was released.

== Musical style and influences ==
Both Volz and Jurhs cited the work of Pearl Jam, Alice in Chains, and Korn as influences. Critics noted that the band's sound, especially the sound of the band's album Through the Eyes, sounded as if it had been influenced by rock band Tool. The band's sound has been described as nu metal, alternative metal and hard rock.

== Members ==
Current members

- Chris Volz – lead vocals (1996–2004, 2006–present)
- Chris Marple – guitar (2010–2012, 2024–present)
- Stacey Brooks Muliford – bass (2025–present)
- Jason Proctor – drums (2025–present)

Former members

- Jason Daunt – guitar (1996–2002, 2006–2008, 2013–2017)
- Ryan Jurhs – bass, backing vocals (1996–2004, 2008–2016)
- Ivan Arnold – drums (1996–1998)
- Lance Arny – guitar (1998–2004, 2006–2007, 2008–2014)
- Chris Ballinger – drums (1999–2003, 2006–2007, 2013–2014)
- Micah Havertape – drums (2003–2004)
- Alex Cando – bass (2006–2008)
- Andy Russ – guitar (2008–2010)
- Terry Harper – drums (2008–2009, 2012–2013)
- Dave Wathen – drums (1998–1999)
- Sean Rued – drums (2009–2012)
- Rich Brown – guitar (2014, 2017–2018)
- Corey Sturgill – drums (2015–2016)
- Jeff Dickie – bass (2016–2017)
- Skyler Martin – drums (2016–2017)
- Mike Mexas – bass (2017)
- Dan Crisafulli – bass (2017–2019)
- Tommy Gibbons – guitar (2016–2017, 2017–2019), bass (2017, 2019)
- Georges Octobous – drums (2017–2020)
- Ethan York – drums (2020–2021)
- Joshua Skellett – bass (2020–2024)
- Rob Buttorff – guitar (2018–2024)
- Myke Akers – bass (2024)
- James Kyle Adkins – drums (2021–2025)
- Brian Carter – bass (2024–2025)
- Chuck Wepfer – guitar (2024–2026)

Former touring members

- Dan Johnson – drums (2017)
- Justin Joyce – bass (2018)
- Frank "Foot" Allen – drums (2021)
- Kris Kohls – drums (2025)

Timeline

== Discography ==
=== Studio albums ===
Album information
Through the Eyes
- Released: October 30, 2001 (U.S.)
- Label: Universal/Republic
- Chart positions: No. 119 (Billboard 200)
Endangered Species
- Released: May 4, 2004 (U.S.)
- Label: Universal
- Chart positions: No. 42 (Billboard 200)
Divided We Fall
- Released: August 19, 2016 (U.S.)
- Label: Pavement 40:59
- Chart positions: No. 125 (Billboard 200)
Vol IV: Because of the Brave
- Released: July 19, 2019 (U.S.)
- Label: Pavement
- Chart positions:
Revival
- Released: March 3, 2022
- Label: Cleopatra
- Chart positions:

=== Independent albums ===
- American Arrogance (1997)
- Flaw (1998)
- Home Grown Studio Sessions (2009)

=== EPs ===
Year	Title	Label
2000	Drama	Independent release
2017	United We Stand	Pavement Entertainment

=== Singles ===
Year	Title	U.S. Mainstream Rock	Album
2001	"Payback"	33	Through the Eyes
2002	"Whole"	38	Through the Eyes
2004	"Recognize"	25	Endangered Species
2015	"Bleed Red"	—	Divided We Fall
2016	"Live and Breathe"	—	Divided We Fall
2018	"Conquer This Climb"	—	Vol IV
2019	"Because of the Brave"	—	Vol IV
2022	"Broken"	—	Revival
