= Sandwich (album) =

Studio album by Psychostick
- Released: May 5, 2009 (US)
- Recorded: August 2008 – 2009
- Studio: Toxic Recording
- Genre: Comedy rock; metalcore; hardcore punk; progressive metal; mathcore
- Length: 75:45
- Label: Rock Ridge
- Producer: Psychostick

Psychostick chronology
The Flesh Eating Roller Skate Holiday Joyride (2007)	Sandwich (2009)	The Digital Appetizer (2010)

Singles from Sandwich
- 1. "This is Not a Song, It's a Sandwich!" Released: 2009; 2. "Girl Directions" Released: 2009; 3. "You've Got Mail Enhancement" Released: 2009; 4. "Passive Vengeance" Released: 2009; 5. "Shower" Released: April 30, 2009

Professional ratings
Review scores
Source	Rating
Allmusic	1.5/5 stars
Revolver	1/5 stars

Sandwich is the second studio album by American comedy metal band Psychostick, and the follow-up to 2003's We Couldn't Think of a Title. The album, a 24-track opus to food, email spam, bad directions, revenge, and more food, was recorded by guitarist Josh Key at Toxic Recording in Gilbert, Arizona, and features new members Jake McReynolds on second guitar and former Indorphine vocalist Jimmy Grant on bass. Rounding out the band roster are Alex Preiss (drums), and Rob Kersey (vocals). It was released May 5, 2009 (US only) via Rock Ridge Music.

Guitarist Josh Key stated that "we already had most of Sandwich written when we started touring to support our first album, We Couldn't Think of a Title, in 2006." Drummer Alex Preiss stated that "Sandwich is a delicious collection of songs written from 2004–2008, mostly 08." Song titles on Sandwich include "Caffeine," "Minimum Rage," and "#1 Radio $ingle."

The band also recorded, as per their album fundraiser, "373 Thank Yous." 373 represents the number of fans – who are individually thanked in the song itself – who donated $50 or more to help the band pay for studio time and equipment. "373 Thank Yous" has a run-time of 14:19 and has been described as "one of the more tedious tracks on a mostly unfunny comedy-metal album." The song itself is a medley of some songs from their previous albums.

== Track listing ==
No.	Title	Lyrics	Music	Length
1.	"Metal?"			0:25
2.	"Caffeine"	Joshua Key, Jimmy Grant	Key	2:49
3.	"Shower"	Key	Key, Jake McReynolds	5:27
4.	"A Lesson in Modesty"			0:36
5.	"P is the Best Letter"	Key, Rob Kersey, Grant, McReynolds	Key	3:03
6.	"Minimum Rage"	Key, Grant, Kersey	Key	3:36
7.	"Don't Eat My Food"	Grant, Key, Kersey, Alex Preiss	Preiss	2:26
8.	"The Hunger Within"	Key	Key	4:09
9.	"Grocery Escape Plan"	Key, Grant, McReynolds	Key, Grant, McReynolds	1:23
10.	"Too Many Food"			0:52
11.	"This is Not a Song, It's a Sandwich!"	Key, Grant	Key	3:53
12.	"Girl Directions"	Key, Grant, Kersey, Rachel Silverton	Key	1:33
13.	"Orange"	Key	Key	3:16
14.	"Beer, Part 2"			0:38
15.	"Do You Want a Taco?"	Key, McReynolds, Grant	Key	1:45
16.	"Attempt at Something Serious"			2:14
17.	"#1 Radio $ingle"	Grant, Key	Key	3:30
18.	"Vah-jay-jay"	Kersey		0:08
19.	"Die... a LOT!"	Grant, Key, McReynolds	Grant, McReynolds	1:35
20.	"You've Got Mail Enhancement"	Key, Kersey, McReynolds, Preiss	Key, McReynolds	3:32
21.	"Passive Vengeance"	Grant, Key, McReynolds	Key, Preiss	4:04
22.	"373 Thank Yous"	Grant, Preiss	Grant, Preiss	14:19
23.	"OUTTAKES!!!1"			6:40
24.	"We Ran Out of CD Space"	Grant, Key	Grant	3:52

== Personnel ==
Psychostick

- Joshua "The J" Key — guitars, vocals
- Jimmy "Jimmychanga" Grant — bass, vocals
- Jake "Jakermeister" McReynolds — guitars, vocals
- Alex "Shmalex" Preiss — drums
- Rob "Rawrb" Kersey — lead vocals
- Guest Appearances:
  - Rachel Silverton on "Girl Directions"
- Produced by Psychostick
- Mixed and Engineered by Joshua "The J" Key
- Artwork by Robert "Rawrb" Kersey
- Recorded at Toxic Recording
- Management by Anthony Caroto
- Photos by Robbie Fuct
- Mastered by Dave Shirk at Sonorus Mastering, INC.

== Chart performance ==
Chart (2009)	Peak position
US Billboard Top Heatseekers	15
US Billboard Top Independent Albums	41
US Billboard Top Internet Albums	269
