= Redemption (Chris Volz album) =

Studio album by Chris Volz
- Released: September 11, 2007
- Genre: Alternative rock; hard rock; post-grunge; nu metal
- Length: 39:40
- Label: Rock Ridge Music
- Producer: Jason Spiewak; Matt Chiaravalle

Singles from Redemption
- 1. "Redemption" Released: 2007

Redemption is the debut solo album by Chris Volz (Flaw, Five.Bolt.Main), released on September 11, 2007. The album's first single is the title track "Redemption". The album sold approximately 700 copies in its first week of release.

== Track listing ==
1. "Redemption" – 3:39
2. "Altercation" – 2:46
3. "All My Life" – 3:20
4. "Wrong" – 2:37
5. "Your Own Medicine" – 3:40
6. "Once Again" – 4:47
7. "Sometimes" – 4:11
8. "Secure" – 3:16
9. "Dear Life" – 4:31
10. "Stories of Old" – 3:33
11. "Don't Save Me" – 3:16

== Personnel ==
- Chris Volz – vocals, guitar (1)
- Matt Chiaravalle – producer, guitar, percussion
- Tom Derr – executive producer
- Susan Mitchell – violin, viola, and cello (7, 11)
- Johnny Pisano – bass guitar (2, 4, 6–11)
- Danny Schuler – drums (1, 3, 5)
- Chad Smalley – drums (2, 4, 6–11)
- Michael Spiewak – acoustic guitar (7)
- Jason Spiewak – producer, piano, keyboards, percussion
- Chris Vitali – bass guitar (1, 3, 5)
