= Do (Psychostick album) =

Studio album by Psychostick
- Released: July 24, 2018
- Recorded: 2014–2018
- Genre: Alternative metal, comedy rock
- Length: 64:41
- Label: Self-released
- Producer: Joshua Key, Psychostick

Psychostick chronology
IV: Revenge of the Vengeance (2014)	Do (2018)	... and Stuff (2022)

Singles from Do
- 1. "Adulting" Released: October 30, 2017; 2. "From the Heart" Released: March 8, 2018

Do is the fifth studio album by American comedy metal band Psychostick. It is the first studio album since 2003 – when they released We Couldn't Think of a Title – that was self-released by the band after they parted ways with the label Rock Ridge. The album is dedicated to the memory of Urizen bassist Rustin Luther, who died in 2017 of a brain tumor. He is featured in "Introvert Party Time." It is the band's last studio album to feature bassist Matty Rzemyk as he would leave the band in 2024.

The album debuted at number one on the Billboard Comedy Albums chart.

== Background ==
The album was the second to be recorded in the band's own studio, after fans funded for the studio while preparing for the previous album, IV: Revenge of the Vengeance. The band announced via Twitch on July 25, 2018, the name of the title, and released the album on their website during the live stream. During the live stream they revealed they worked on the album over four years. The album was released on streaming platforms on July 27, 2018.

== Songs ==
"Adulting" was released on YouTube on October 30, 2017. "From the Heart (I Hate You)" was released on YouTube on March 8, 2018.

On the Twitch stream on July 25, 2018, the music video for "Do" was released, as well as uploaded on to YouTube. During the Twitch stream Psychostick also played "Tuesday", "Socks and Sandals", "Introvert Party Time", "Stream Stutter", "Rent in Peace", "Uncle Material", "Gurrrrrr", "You Can (Maybe) Do It", "Keys" and "Moving Day". "Do" and "You Can (Maybe) Do It" were released on YouTube shortly after.

== Track listing ==
All music written by Joshua Key except where noted.

No.	Title	Lyrics	Music	Length
1.	"We Are a Band"	Key		1:48
2.	"You Can (Maybe) Do It"	Key		4:20
3.	"Tuesday"	Key, Patrick Murphy		2:05
4.	"Adulting"	Key, Murphy, Robert Kersey		3:50
5.	"From the Heart"	Murphy, Matty J. Rzemyk	Rzemyk	3:16
6.	"Do"	Murphy		1:21
7.	"got no brakes demo.wav"	Murphy		1:54
8.	"Introvert Party Time"	Key, Alex Dontre, Kersey, Murphy		3:33
9.	"Thinkin With Yer D"	Key, Rzemyk		1:49
10.	"Uncle Material"	Key, Rzemyk, Kersey, Dontre		3:41
11.	"Bacon Egg & Cheese on Toast with Sriracha"	Rzemyk	Rzemyk	0:45
12.	"Uhhhnngg"	Kersey	Kersey, Key	0:53
13.	"Stream Stutter"	Key, Kersey, Murphy		4:17
14.	"got no brakes mix ver3.wav"	Murphy		1:39
15.	"Socks and Sandals"	Murphy, Key, Dontre, Kersey		3:19
16.	"Keys"	Key		1:16
17.	"Gurrrrrr"	Kersey	Kersey, Key	0:31
18.	"Moving Day"	Dontre, Key, Rzemyk	Key, Rzemyk, Dontre	6:09
19.	"Rent in Peace"	Key, Rzemyk, Dontre		5:00
20.	"got no brakes finalmix03 FINAL07.wav"	Murphy		1:34
21.	"Outtakes Episode V: Outtakes Strike Back"			7:39
22.	"Flop"	Murphy, Kersey, Rzemyk, Dontre	Rzemyk	4:02
Total length:				64:41

== Personnel ==
- Joshua "The J" Key — guitars, cupcakeist
- Robert "Rawrb" Kersey — vocals, derptroller
- Alex "Shitbag" Dontre — drums, pelican
- Matty J. "Moose" Rzemyk — bass, antlers, merch-monger
- Patrick "Murph" Murphy — videographist, pork specialist

=== Additional personnel ===
- Lynzi Hayes, Kryssie Ridolfi, Rob Whishenhunt – guest vocals on "We Are A Band"
- Sheena Perez – guest vocals on "Adulting"
- Rustin Luther, Anthony Sardinha, Patrick Murphy, Magda "Merchqueen" Ksaizak – guest starring on "Introvert Party Time"
- Kryssie Ridolfi, Angela Knight, Nick "Gino" Ferrari – guest vocals on "Socks & Sandals"
