= Live (Five.Bolt.Main album) =

Live album by Five.Bolt.Main
- Released: October 10, 2006
- Recorded: February 17, 2006
- Venue: Bulldog Cafe, Louisville, KY
- Genre: Nu metal, alternative metal
- Length: 41:54
- Label: Rock Ridge
- Producer: Jason Spiewak; Matt Chiaravalle

Five.Bolt.Main chronology
Venting (2005)	Live (2006)

Professional ratings
Review scores
Source	Rating
Allmusic	link

Live is the second release by the nu metal music group Five.Bolt.Main. The live album was released on October 10, 2006, via Rock Ridge Music. The album features one unreleased song ("Just My Luck") and a cover version of the Flaw track "Only the Strong". The album was recorded live at Bulldog Cafe in the band's hometown of Louisville, Kentucky on February 17, 2006.

== Track listing ==
All lyrics written by Chris Volz. All music written by Five.Bolt.Main, except "Only the Strong", written by Flaw.

1. "Slip" – 3:43
2. "Pathetic" – 4:02
3. "The Gift" – 2:52
4. "Seem to Be Fine" – 4:00
5. "Just My Luck" – 3:56
6. "What You Are" – 3:26
7. "Broken Compass" – 3:44
8. "Only the Strong" (Flaw cover) – 4:21
9. "Made Like This" – 3:45
10. "Wait in Line" – 4:28
11. "Breathing" - 3:34

== Personnel ==
Five.Bolt.Main

- Chris Volz – vocals
- Alex Cando – bass guitar
- Ronny Paige – guitar
- Ivan Arnold – drums

Additional personnel

- Jason Spiewak – producer, executive producer
- Matt Chiaravalle – producer, mixing, mastering
- Chris Cassetta – live engineering
- Chris Jones – live engineering
- Tom Derr – executive producer
