= Payback (Flaw song) =

Single by Flaw

from the album Through the Eyes
- Released: 2001
- Recorded: 2001
- Genre: Nu metal
- Length: 4:02
- Label: Republic; Universal
- Songwriters: Lance Arny; Chris Ballinger; Jason Daunt; Ryan Jurhs; Chris Volz
- Producer: David Bottrill

Flaw singles chronology
| "Payback" (2001) | "Whole" (2002) |

"Payback" is a song by American nu metal band Flaw. The song was released as a single from their major-label debut Through the Eyes.

== Meaning ==
Flaw's vocalist Chris Volz spoke about the song's meaning saying

""Payback" basically was written a couple years ago. It's really kind of an intense song that goes back and forth between kind of anger and frustration for not really understandin' a lot of things in life, a lot of things that happen, a lot of things that people do to you that don't make sense or you wouldn't do to someone else. So it's really just about kind of coming full circle in your own mind, realizing that, you know, things are gonna happen, things are gonna be negative but, you know, everything kinda comes back in the end. You know. Kinda like karma. Everybody gets their payback for whatever happens. You know, I mean, not on a religious level but you know even just as far as, you know, bad deeds or something."

== Track listing ==
| No. | Title | Length |
|---|---|---|
| 1. | "Payback (Clean)" | 4:02 |
| 2. | "Payback (Album Version)" | 4:02 |
| 3. | "Away (Unreleased)" | 3:10 |
| 4. | "Scheme" | 3:47 |

| No. | Title | Length |
|---|---|---|
| 1. | "Payback (Radio Edit)" |
| 2. | "Payback (Album Version)" |

== Personnel ==
=== Main personnel ===
- Flaw – composer, primary artist
- Chris Volz – lead vocals, composer
- Jason Daunt – guitar
- Ryan Jurhs – bass, backing vocals
- Chris Ballinger – drums
- Lance Arny – guitar

=== Additional personnel ===
- David Bottrill – engineer, mixing, producer
- Phillip Broussaard – assistant engineer, assistant producer, mixing
- Sandy Brummels – creative director
- Bob Ludwig – mastering
- Clay Patrick McBridge – photography
- Justin Pynes – assistant
- Karen Walker – art direction, design

== In popular culture ==
The song was featured on the soundtrack of Project Gotham Racing 2.

== Charts ==
| Chart | Peak position |
|---|---|
| US Mainstream Rock Tracks | 33 |

== Music video ==
The music video shows a woman (portrayed by Heidi Marnhout) waking up on a bed in the middle of a forest at night. As she steps out, she steps on a ground of worms. She runs trying to escape the forest and sees a man in a bath tub full of grub worms and sees a tree with the word "RUN" both capitalized and in blood. The female also gets chased by somebody who appears to be a ghost. In the end, she wakes up believing it was just a dream but her feet are covered in mud and there are worms all over and around her clock. The band are in the music video performing in a forest.

== Sources ==
- Flaw - Payback (CD) at Discogs
- Flaw - Payback (CD) at Discogs (Other version)
- Through the Eyes - Flaw | Credits | Allmusic
