= Space Vampires vs Zombie Dinosaurs in 3D =

Studio album by Psychostick
- Released: August 16, 2011
- Recorded: 2010–2011
- Genre: Comedy Rock, Metalcore
- Length: 51:03
- Label: Rock Ridge
- Producer: Joshua Key, Psychostick

Psychostick chronology
The Digital Appetizer (2010)	Space Vampires vs Zombie Dinosaurs in 3D (2011)	IV: Revenge of the Vengeance (2014)

Singles from Space Vampires vs Zombie Dinosaurs in 3D
- 1. "Political Bum" Released: July 22, 2011 (with pre-order), August 15, 2011; 2. "Because Boobs" Released: August 6, 2011

Professional ratings
Review scores
Source	Rating
EverythingButUrban.com	4/5 stars
TheFrontRowReport.com	8/10 stars
MetalBuzz.net	(favorable)
MetalSucks	(negative)
Ultimate Guitar Archive	8/10 stars
KillHipsters	4/5 stars

Space Vampires vs Zombie Dinosaurs in 3D is the third studio album by American comedy metal band Psychostick, released on August 16, 2011, through Rock Ridge Music. It is the band's first studio album with bass player Matty J "Poolmoose" Rzemyk.

== Background ==
The band announced during a webcast on November 4, 2010, that they are working on their new album to be released in summer 2011. The title of the new album, Space Vampires vs Zombie Dinosaurs in 3D, was announced on another webcast on March 10, 2011, and the band has said that it will have a "tentative August 2011 release date" through Rock Ridge Music. On July 12, 2011, the band announced the album's released date would be August 16, 2011. On July 22, 2011, the band began taking pre-orders for the album, doing so also allows for an instant download of the album's first single "Political Bum." On August 6, 2011, the band released "Because Boobs" as a free download in order to promote the album.

== Track listing ==
No.	Title	Length
1.	"Premature Intoxication"	0:43
2.	"Welcome to the Show"	2:04
3.	"Sadface :(" (Parodies "The Beautiful People", "Bed Intruder Song" and "They're Coming to Take Me Away, Ha-Haaa!")	3:27
4.	"Because Boobs"	3:43
5.	"Intervention for a Good Mood"	2:45
6.	"Hate Times 8"	3:32
7.	"It's Just a Movie, Stupid"	3:36
8.	"Political Bum"	3:44
9.	"That Guy" ("Beer" reference from We Couldn't Think of a Title)	1:20
10.	"Six Pounds of Terror"	1:30
11.	"Methane Crescendo"	2:51
12.	"My Clingy Girlfriend"	5:00
13.	"The Root of All Evil"	3:56
14.	"Numbers (I Can Only Count to Four)" (Parody of "Bodies" by Drowning Pool)	4:14
15.	"Duh, of Course We Did Outtakes!"	8:38

== Personnel ==
Psychostick

- Alex "Shmalex" Dontre – drums
- Robert "Rawrb" Kersey – lead vocals
- Joshua "The J" Key – guitars, vocals
- Matty J "Poolmoose" Rzemyk – bass, vocals
- Additional Musicians:
  - Barry Donegan (of Look What I Did) as the political bum on "Political Bum"
- Produced by Joshua "The J" Key and Psychostick
- Mixed and Engineered by Joshua "The J" Key
- Artwork by Michelle "Souzou" Sladek
- Layout by Robert "Rawrb" Kersey
- Drums tracked by Adam Lichtenauer at Studio City

== Chart performance ==
Chart (2011)	Peak position
US Billboard Top Hard Rock Albums	24
US Billboard Top Independent Albums	45
