= Indorphine =

American metal band

- Origin: Orlando, Florida, U.S.
- Genres: Noise rock; alternative metal; avant-garde metal; nu metal; comedy metal
- Years active: 2001–2007, 2010–2012, 2019-Present
- Label: Rock Ridge Music
- Members: Jimmy Grant; Everett Sailor; Adam Phillips; Pete Medrano; Marshall Stephens
- Past members: Dan Stewart; Tanner Keegan; Buddy Fischel; Brett Walker; Chris Coleman

Indorphine is an American alternative metal band from Orlando, Florida.

== History ==
Like many influential grassroots bands before them, Indorphine began in the garage of lead singer Jimmy Grant as he, and high school friend and drummer Everett Sailor, annoyed their Kissimmee neighbors with their loud and abstract music. One day however a neighbor from across the street, interested instead of disgusted in the odd noises resonating daily, introduced himself as Buddy Fischel to the already named duo Indorphine with an interest in joining forces. An experienced guitar player from Syracuse, NY, Fischel was welcomed into the band and their lineup was nearly complete. Local bassist and songwriter Dan Stewart entered the picture, and the band was then ready to begin forging ahead. Dan contributed several songs to the band which provided them with enough material to begin playing live. The first Indorphine concert occurred on May 5, 2001, at Midtown Tavern in Orlando, FL. After performing locally for several months, the band entered Crush Studios to record their first full-length album entitled 12 Lbs. During the recording of 12 Lbs. Indorphine met Adam Phillips, another New Yorker and guitar virtuoso, when their respective bands played a benefit show for the late Chuck Schuldiner. Phillips became one of Indorphine's earliest diehard local fans. He began following the band from show to show and became their guitar tech until Indorphine heard his extensive talent and offered to make him an official member just before the release of their debut record. Adam obliged and parted ways with his previous band to explore this new opportunity. After Dan Stewart was relieved of his duties due to private reasons, bassist and vocalist, and Indiana native, Tanner Keegan took a chance leaving the Orlando band Milka to explore his options with the experimental Indorphine; completing their classic lineup.

The band began rigorously playing locally and regionally, writing new material during downtime. Their sound evolved from the adolescence of their debut album to that of a more matured band who'd found their voice; oddball metal injected with sarcastic, and sometimes self deprecating, comedy. Record labels began taking notice of the industry buzz about the band, and Indorphine was placed on stage in front of A&R reps in New York, Atlanta, Austin, and Los Angeles. Refusing to conform to standards such as image and song length, Indorphine decided to record their second full-length album without the assistance of a record label. The band entered Vision Sound Studios in Jacksonville, FL during the summer of 2005 with 14 songs ready to be recorded. The addition of their cover of Mississippi Queen by the band Mountain was decided upon during the recording process. Indorphine was encouraged to utilize all of their off kilter ideas while making this album, and incorporated sounds and instruments such as a pool hose with a microphone in one end, a chattering penguin pen, violin, cello, and a piece of rivetted sheet metal into the recording's many sonic layers. The album was given the title Glowsticks for Clubbing Baby Seals and the band began once again shopping for a record label to release their new work. Indorphine was signed to Rock Ridge Music, and the album was released in stores on July 11, 2006.

After shooting and releasing a music video for the song Spaghetti, they began an extensive touring cycle with bands such as Shinedown, Bobaflex, Sleepytime Gorilla Museum, The Accident Experiment, Psychostick, Invitro, etc. Indorphine also began playing at landmark venues such as CBGB, The Whiskey, The Roxy, Key Club, House of Blues, and Hard Rock Live during their many tours promoting the Glowsticks album, and also performed at SXSW in Austin, Atlantis Music Conference in Atlanta, and large scale festivals such as Earthday Birthday.

At the end of their winter 2007 tour, guitarist Adam Phillips decided it was time to part ways with the band and explore other aspects of life and music. His shoes were filled by Orlando guitarist Brett Walker. Founding member and drummer Everett Sailor departed the band shortly after, followed by rhythm guitarist Buddy Fischel. West Palm Beach native Chris Coleman stepped into the position of drummer and the band began touring again with the new lineup; a four piece.

Shortly after the Holiday Hate Tour with Psychostick and Screaming Mechanical Brain in 2007, Indorphine suddenly, and without notice, disbanded. Two months later Jimmy Grant resurfaced as the new bassist for Psychostick - a position he would quit in December 2009.

In September 2010, Jimmy Grant posted a video, hinting at Indorphine reuniting with its classic lineup. Jimmy, along with Tanner Keegan and Everett Sailor, had been working on a concept album entitled Cowboy Maloney's Electric City vs. The Chocolate Chewbaccapocalypse for several months. Grant contacted original guitarists Phillips and Fischel, asking if they would be interested in participating in a reunion show. Adam accepted the offer, but Buddy would not be rejoining the band due to family life. Marshall Stephens was introduced as the new rhythm guitarist, and the band made their live return on January 7, 2011, with four out of five members of the classic lineup. The band made another live appearance in February 2012, performing three more times that year. The band then went back into hibernation while their members began other musical and life journeys.

Guitarist Adam Phillips joined NYHC heavyweights Pro-Pain, the band of which rhythm guitarist Marshall Stephens was also a member, and began touring Europe extensively. Drummer Everett Sailor began working as an airplane mechanic. Vocalist Jimmy Grant became a father of two children. And Bassist Tanner Keegan joined the band Tremonti after the departure of their bassist Wolfgang Van Halen.

In 2017, Jimmy Grant and Everett Sailor began writing new material for a brand new project entitled Dr. Awesomeballs and the Compendium of Historical Importantness. Jimmy, being a proficient bassist himself, took on the duty of playing bass and singing. They were joined by long-time friend of the band Pete Medrano on guitar. After playing several shows locally in 2018, Pete Medrano contacted guitarist Adam Phillips and informed him that the band intended to cover the Indorphine song Spaghetti at their next performance, and requested pointers on playing the song properly. Phillips offered to play the song with them, and then called Tanner Keegan to see if he was also interested in joining him for this cameo appearance. Tanner obliged, and plans were discussed to perform the song live. After several conversations, the group decided to play three Indorphine songs at the show since four out of five of its members would be present. Then the idea to play half a set was discussed, and the brief cameo appearance snowballed into what would become a full set of Indorphine songs with Pete Medrano on rhythm guitar. During the rehearsals for this unintentional reunion show, new material was written. This was a signal to the band that it was time to come out of hibernation once again. On December 6, 2019, Indorphine returned to the stage at The Haven in Orlando, FL.

After completing that performance and making Pete Medrano a permanent member of the band, the entire world shut down due to the COVID-19 pandemic. Unable to continue performing for the time being, Indorphine decided to write and record a brand new five song EP. They entered Magnolia Studios and Reverse 13 Studios with producer/engineer Ben Johnson, and treated this album just as they had their previous effort; with creative freedom. Dozens of real instruments and sounds were utilized such as a hand-crank siren, toy piano, violin, saxophone, toy accordion, and lap steel guitar. The now completed EP was given the title Food Fight at the O.K. Corral.

After wrapping up the mixing and mastering of F.F.A.T.O.K.C, Tanner Keegan made the decision to step away from Indorphine for at least a year due to his own extensive recording and touring cycle with Tremonti. Indorphine asked for his blessing to find a substitute bassist during his time away, and Tanner willingly gave it to them. Marshall Stephens, being an extremely proficient bassist and ex member of the band, was the obvious choice. Stephens accepted the offer, and the band again began playing shows around the state of Florida.

There were three singles released as album promotion of the F.F.A.T.O.K.C. EP. The title track was released as a single on October 21, 2022. Patina was released on November 18, 2022. And The Curse of El Gordo was released on December 16, 2022. There are also official guitar playthrough videos for all three singles available on the band's YouTube channel, as well as a three part "behind the scenes" documentary which brings the viewer along into the process of writing and recording the album. The entire Food Fight at the O.K. Corral EP was released on January 13, 2023, and is available on all streaming platforms. The band currently does not have plans to create physical copies of this release.

On January 30, 2023, the band announced via social media that Tanner Keegan had officially stepped down from his position in the band due to his continually busy schedule. In the same announcement, they welcomed Marshall Stephens into the band as a permanent member.

Indorphine released Glowsticks for Clubbing Baby Seals on all streaming services March 24, 2023.

In August of 2025, the band entered Hi-5 Studio with Bloodlet vocalist/producer/engineer Scott Angelacos to record a brand new five song EP. They are currently in the final stages of tracking, and fans can likely expect an early 2027 release.

On April 23rd, 2026, Indorphine announced via social media that a very special show had been planned for July 11th of that year to celebrate the 20th anniversary of their Glowsticks for Clubbing Baby Seals album. The band played the album in its entirety for the first time ever, featuring its current lineup along with guest musicians including ex members Tanner Keegan and Buddy Fischel, as well as violinist/flutist Kristie DeLuca and Ignid/10 Food Mountain guitarist Darius Amendolia. To coincide with the event, a special 20th anniversary edition of the album was released on all streaming platforms the same day, exactly 20 years to the date after its initial release. The special edition, entitled Glowsticks for Clubbing Baby Seals 20th Adversary... Adversity... BAAAHHH! Stupid Talk to Text, features the full album plus eight extra tracks including demo versions, isolated drums, a live recording, and the full out-of-print acoustic EP Twice as Long, Half as Fast, which had never been previously released on streaming platforms.

== Live performances ==
Indorphine's live shows consist of extremely intense stage presence, swapping instruments with each other for different songs, and comedic stage banter.

== Discography ==
- 12 lbs (2002)
- The Lasagna Monologues (Exclusive Tour EP) (2005)
- Twice as Long, Half as Fast (Acoustic EP) (2006)
- Glowsticks for Clubbing Baby Seals (2006)
- Food Fight at the O.K. Corral (2023)
- Glowsticks for Clubbing Baby Seals 20th Adversary... Adversity... BAAAHHH! Stupid Talk to Text (2026)

== Awards ==
Orlando Music Awards

- 2003 OMA (Orlando Music Awards) — Best METAL Performance
- 2003 OMA (Orlando Music Awards) — Best New Act of the Year
- 2003 OMA (Orlando Metal Awards) - Best METAL Bassist (Tanner Keegan)
- 2003 OMA (Orlando Metal Awards) - Best METAL Performance

MTV

Song Title of the Week - "Motor Driven Puppy Stabber"
