= Through the Eyes =

Studio album by Flaw
- Released: October 30, 2001
- Recorded: 2001
- Studios: Sound City, Van Nuys, California; Larrabee North Studios, North Hollywood, California; Gateway Mastering, Portland, Maine
- Genre: Nu metal
- Length: 61:14
- Labels: Universal; Uptown; Republic
- Producer: David Bottrill

Flaw chronology
Drama (2000)	Through the Eyes (2001)	Endangered Species (2004)

Singles from Through the Eyes
- 1. "Payback" Released: 2001; 2. "Whole" Released: May 20, 2002

Through the Eyes is the first major label studio album by the American nu metal band Flaw. The album was released on October 30, 2001, on Universal, Uptown and Republic Records. Described as nu metal, Through the Eyes has melodic vocals, aggressive guitar riffs, screaming, melodic instrumentation and lyrics drawn from the childhood and adolescence of vocalist Chris Volz, who dealt with his adoptive mother's suicide, rebellious behavior and a formerly troubled relationship with his father. Some songs were soft and melodic whereas some other songs were heavy and featured screaming. Lyrics often are about topics like Volz' adoptive mother's suicide, trauma, frustration and stoicism.

Flaw began in 1996, when the vocalist Volz answered an advertisement placed by band guitarist Jason Daunt for another guitarist. The band then recorded their first independent record, American Arrogance. In 2000, Flaw was noticed by Republic and Universal Records and signed a record deal. With producer David Bottrill, they recorded at Sound City in Los Angeles in early 2001.

To promote Through the Eyes, Flaw released "Payback" and "Whole" and recorded music videos for the singles. Through the Eyes had moderate success, reaching number 119 on the Billboard 200 and number one on the Top Heatseekers chart. The album sold more than 150,000 copies. Through the Eyes received mixed-to-positive reviews from critics, who praised its vocals and instrumentation.

== Background and recording ==
Many lyrics on Through the Eyes are drawn from Chris Volz' difficult childhood and adolescence. When he was 11 or 12 years old, his adoptive mother committed suicide. Volz began to embrace aggressive rock music and rebel against authority figures, including his teachers and his father, Joe. Joe sent Chris to military school, but Chris ran away. Joe then sent his son to several youth detention centers and, when Chris was 14, to a long-term drug rehabilitation center. Young Volz ran away from the center, and was picked up by police and placed in another juvenile detention center. The court ruled that Volz was not a candidate for rehab and Joe was ordered by the police to take him back, which embittered him toward his son. As Volz grew older, his relationship with Joe improved and his father was the best man at his wedding.

Flaw formed in 1996, when guitarist Jason Daunt placed an advertisement for another guitarist and Volz answered. They then recorded their first independent record, American Arrogance in 1997. In 2000, Flaw played at CBGB in New York City, when they were noticed by Republic and Universal Records executives and signed a deal with the labels. With producer David Bottrill, they recorded at Sound City in Los Angeles in early 2001.

== Music and lyrics ==
Described as nu metal, Through the Eyes includes singing, screaming, aggressive guitar riffs and melodic instrumentation. "Get Up Again" and "Reliance" have an aggressive sound, and "My Letter" and "Best I Am" are softer. The album has been compared to the music of Disturbed, Tool, Linkin Park, Factory 81, A Perfect Circle and Saliva.

"I would say that it's a very diverse album in terms of musical content. I mean, we touch on a lot of different areas from a really straight-forward heavy metal sound to all kinds of different layers and textures. We all like different kinds of music and so we didn't want to make an album with one kind of sound. We wanted it to be very diverse because life is like that. There's times when you feel angry, when you feel sad, when you feel happy or even lost. We wanted to incorporate all those feelings into a sound that would actually give the industry a hard time of labeling us."

— Flaw vocalist Chris Volz, speaking about the album's music

Through the Eyes' lyrics are drawn from vocalist Chris Volz's life, including his childhood; "Whole" is about the suicide of his adoptive mother. Volz said about the song, "Everything in that song touches from sadness to anger to grief to blaming myself to confusion. I just really wanted to go as deep into it as I possibly could and still be able to come back. She was the one who got me into music. She was an operatic singer, and for me to go wholly into music has kept a part of her alive inside of me".

According to Jon Wiederhorn of MTV, "Inner Strength", "Get Up Again" and "Reliance" are about trauma and frustration: "If art could accurately imitate life's many nuances, Flaw's Through the Eyes would be one of the most powerful, traumatizing nü-metal records ever". Volz said about the meaning of "Get Up Again", "It's about never letting one thing or one circumstance get the best of you and try to turn a negative around into something positive. So, whether it was because I was adopted or my mom's suicide when I was younger or having to take my dad to court so I could take charge of my life, that song kinda stands for dealing with life's problems and never feeling sorry for yourself and actually coming out on top". He said that "Inner Strength" is about "finding your own road and really developing that 'inner strength' part of your personality"; "Only the Strong" is "really about realizing you have the power to feel about yourself the way you want and everyone else can fuck off. There are so many people that will try to bring you down, so instead of listening to what those people have to say, besides from family, friends, and loved ones. Just knowing that you are strong and that will help everyone survive".

== Promotion, release and critical reception ==
=== Promotion and release ===
Through the Eyes was released by Universal, Uptown and Republic Records on October 30, 2001. Two songs have music videos: "Payback" and "Whole". The music video for "Payback" premiered in the summer of 2001. The second single, "Whole", was released on May 20, 2002. The album peaked at number 119 on the Billboard 200 on June 15, 2002 and number one on the Heatseekers Albums chart on June 22, 2002. It sold 7,000 copies per week for several weeks, and has sold over 150,000 copies. "Only the Strong" appears on the soundtrack for The Scorpion King, which sold 90,000 copies in the week after its release. The soundtrack reached number eight on the Billboard 200 before climbing to number five. The song "Get Up Again" was featured in the soundtrack to the 2004 video game MX Unleashed, as well as for UFC 2009: Undisputed.

=== Critical reception ===
Professional ratings
Review scores
Source	Rating
AllMusic	2.5/5 stars
Melodic	2.5/5 stars

Through the Eyes received mixed-to-positive reviews from critics. According to Mark Jenkins of the Washington Post, "Like Sevendust, Flaw is apparently still smarting from childhood trauma" and, ultimately, "Flaw lets its guard down". AntiGUY of AntiMUSIC gave Through the Eyes four smiley faces and wrote that the album "is the perfect counter argument [sic] to those who would casually dismiss the nu metal genre as only simplistic drop tuned guitars pounding out unremitting powerchords and primal screaming vocals". AntiGUY praised Volz' vocals, comparing Flaw to Factory 81 and A Perfect Circle. According to Brian O'Neill of AllMusic, "A few catchy tracks – such as the lead single, "Payback," and the eerie "My Letter" – are surrounded by filler that fails to stick". However, O'Neill called Volz' singing "powerful and melodious". Andy Schwegler wrote that Through the Eyes "is perfect if you want 13 tracks of jamming for your car, but it ultimately runs thin in the long run".

== Album cover ==
The album cover depicts a pensive-looking young boy with a zipped-shut mouth. Volz elaborates: "The cover of our album is a 12-year-old little boy who doesn't look like he's in pain, but it looks like he's got a world of things he wants to say, but his mouth is zippered shut. And that's kind of the way I felt throughout most of my childhood."

== Track listing ==
All music written and arranged by Flaw. Lyrics by Chris Volz.

No.	Title	Length
1.	"Only the Strong"	4:19
2.	"Payback"	4:02
3.	"My Letter"	4:35
4.	"Get Up Again"	2:57
5.	"Whole"	3:52
6.	"Amendment"	5:20
7.	"Scheme"	3:49
8.	"What I Have to Do"	5:41
9.	"Inner Strength"	3:43
10.	"Best I Am"	4:36
11.	"Out of Whack"	3:47
12.	"Reliance"	3:25
13.	"One More Time" (Hidden track: "Only the Strong" [piano version] at 6:19)	11:07
Total length:		1:01:14

Bonus Tracks
No.	Title	Length
14.	"No Time"	4:08
15.	"Away"	3:09

Special Edition
No.	Title	Length
14.	"Away"	3:09
15.	"No Time" (Hidden track: "Only the Strong" [piano version] at 6:08)	10:55

== Personnel ==
Adapted from AllMusic.

Flaw

- Chris Volz – lead vocals
- Jason Daunt – guitar, keyboards
- Ryan Jurhs – bass, backing vocals
- Chris Ballinger – drums
- Lance Arny – guitar

Production

- David Bottrill – producer, engineer, mixing
- Phil Broussaard – assistant engineer
- Justin Pynes – mixing assistant
- Brian Paturalski – mixing assistant
- Bob Ludwig – mastering

Artwork

- Sandy Brummels – creative director
- Karen Walker – art direction, design
- Clay Patrick McBridge – photography

== Chart positions ==
Chart (2002)	Peak position
Billboard 200	119
Heatseekers Albums	1
