= Endangered Species (Flaw album) =

2004 studio album by Flaw

Studio album by Flaw
- Released: May 4, 2004
- Recorded: 2003
- Genre: Nu metal
- Length: 49:56
- Label: Universal
- Producer: David Bottrill

Flaw chronology
Through The Eyes (2001)	Endangered Species (2004)	Home Grown Studio Sessions (2009)

Singles from Endangered Species
- 1. "Recognize" Released: March 16, 2004

Professional ratings
Review scores
Source	Rating
AbsolutePunk	(82%)

Endangered Species is the second studio album by the American nu metal band Flaw. It was released on May 4, 2004. The album debuted at #42 on the Billboard 200 chart.

== Background and recording ==
As explained by vocalist Chris Volz, the fairly lengthy delay between the release of Through the Eyes and Endangered Species was the result of 18 months of touring and, sequentially, the band's desire to not hastily release an album without being happy with its contents. AllMusic writes that ”[the album] finds the band further refining its signature sound with a collection of songs that explores existential angst, but with a clarity of vision and realistic outlook that encourages rather than depresses.”

After the band's breakup, pre-production demos for majority of the songs on the album, in addition to 7 unreleased tracks, were made available on the internet. They were quickly taken offline after Universal had words with the webmaster of the site that had illegally distributed the tracks. The webmaster was allowed by the band to put the tracks online, but he did not have the legal rights to do so from Universal. The differences between the demo and final versions are mostly lyrical, though "Medicate" has entirely different lyrics and a different riff in the bridge.

The album spawned one single, "Recognize", which failed to receive significant radio airplay, but charted higher than any other Flaw single.

== Track listing ==
All music written by Ryan Jurhs and Lance Arny and arranged by Flaw, except "Wait for Me", written by Chris Volz and arranged by David Bottrill.
All lyrics by Chris Volz. Drum parts written by Chris Ballinger.

No.	Title	Length
1.	"Medicate"	3:31
2.	"Endangered Species"	3:45
3.	"Recognize"	4:11
4.	"Wait for Me"	4:34
5.	"Many Faces"	3:59
6.	"All the Worst"	3:57
7.	"You've Changed"	3:48
8.	"Turn the Tables"	3:13
9.	"Worlds Divide"	5:31
10.	"Decide"	4:53
11.	"Final Cry"	4:07
12.	"Not Enough"	4:27

== B-Sides ==
No.	Title	Length
13.	"Can't Forget"	3:41
14.	"Consequences of Emotion"	6:14
15.	"One Step at a Time"	4:41
16.	"Keep Me Behind"	5:37
17.	"Nothing Else"	3:10
18.	"Changing Places"	3:26
19.	"Sound Your Voices"	4:29

== Demo's ==
- The track listing below does not reflect the original track order on the band's own CD.

No.	Title	Length
1.	"Medicate"	3:41
2.	"Endangered Species"	4:03
3.	"Recognize"	5:20
4.	"Many Faces"	4:34
5.	"You've Changed"	4:16
6.	"Turn the Tables"	2:33
7.	"Worlds Divide"	5:48
8.	"Decide"	5:10
9.	"Final Cry"	4:42
10.	"Not Enough"	5:16

== Credits ==
Flaw

- Chris Volz - vocals
- Lance Arny - guitars
- Ryan Jurhs - bass guitar, acoustic guitar
- Micah Havertape - drums

Additional musicians

- Nik Zidkyahu - drums
- Brian Sperber - piano, acoustic guitar
- Kurt Unaela – percussion
- David Bottrill - keyboards
- Jamshied Sharifi - string arrangements
- Jull Dell'Abate – string contractor
- Carol Webb - violin
- Katherine Livolsi-Stern – violin
- Karen Dreyfuss - viola
- Jennne LaBlanc - cello

Production and design

- David Bottrill - producer, mixing
- Brian Sperber - engineering
- Kurt Unaela – Pro Tools editing, additional engineering
- Josh Monroy - pre-production engineering
- Brock Seiler – pre-production assistant engineer
- Peter Doris – assistant drum engineer
- Hillary Johnson – assistant bass guitar engineer
- Gus Oberg – assistant guitar, vocal, string, and keyboard engineer
- Steve Sisco – mixing assistant
- Bob Ludwig - mastering
- Dean Karr – band and cover photography
- Sandy Brummels – creative director
- Steven R. Gilmore - sleeve art direction, design
