= The Flesh Eating Roller Skate Holiday Joyride =

The Flesh Eating Rollerskate Holiday Joyride

EP by Psychostick
- Released: September 25, 2007
- Length: 18:11
- Label: Rock Ridge
- Producer: Psychostick

Psychostick chronology
We Couldn't Think of a Title (2003)	The Flesh Eating Rollerskate Holiday Joyride (2007)	Sandwich (2009)

Singles from The Flesh Eating Rollerskate Holiday Joyride
- 1. "Jolly Old Sadist" Released: August 13, 2007; 2. "Jingle Bell Metal / Silent Night" Released: 2007

The Flesh Eating Rollerskate Holiday Joyride is a holiday album by American comedy metal band Psychostick, released in the United States on September 25, 2007, through Rock Ridge Music. It is the band's final release to feature bassist Mike Kocian.

As of October 2007, The Flesh Eating Rollerskate Holiday Joyride had reached No. 18 on Billboard's Top Holiday Albums.

== Track listing ==
No.	Title	Lyrics	Music	Length
1.	"Doom to the World"			0:35
2.	"Holiday Hate"	Joshua Key, Mike Kocian, Rob Kersey	Key	3:32
3.	"Jolly Old Sadist"	Key, Kocian	Key, Kocian	3:24
4.	"hXc VS \m/"			0:24
5.	"Jingle Bell Metal"	Key, Alex Preiss, Kersey	Kersey, Key	2:50
6.	"Silent Night"	Josef Mohr	Preiss, Key	0:24
7.	"Red Snow"	Preiss	Preiss, Key	4:02
8.	"Happy Fucking New Year"	Preiss, Kocian, Key	Key, Kocian	3:06

== Personnel ==
Psychostick is:

- Robert "Rawrb!" Kersey (Lead Vocals)
- Joshua "The J" Key (Guitar, Vocals)
- Mike "MiketheEvil" Kocian (Bass guitar, Vocals)
- Alex "Shmalex" Preiss (Drums)
- Guest Appearances:
  - 2001 AHS Band on "Doom to the World"
  - Jason Hallack (group vocals)
- Produced by Psychostick
- Mixed and Engineered by Joshua "The J" Key
- Artwork by Robert "Rawrb" Kersey
- Anime X-Mas Zombie artwork by Kat "The Darkness Kitten" Fetteroll
- Tracking at Toxic Recording
- Flesh Eating Rollerskate by Nick Church
- Mastered by Dave Shirk at Sonorus Mastering, Inc

== Chart performance ==
Chart (2007)	Peak position
US Billboard Top Holiday Albums	18
