= IV: Revenge of the Vengeance =

Studio album by Psychostick
- Released: November 4, 2014
- Recorded: 2013–2014
- Genre: Comedy rock; metalcore; hardcore punk
- Length: 57:13
- Label: Rock Ridge
- Producer: Joshua Key, Patrick Murphy, Psychostick

Psychostick chronology
Space Vampires VS Zombie Dinosaurs in 3D (2011)	IV: Revenge of the Vengeance (2014)	Do (2018)

Singles from Revenge of the Vengeance
- 1. "Dogs Like Socks" Released: January 13, 2013; 2. "Obey the Beard" Released: November 5, 2013

IV: Revenge of the Vengeance is the fourth studio album by American comedy metal band Psychostick, released on November 4, 2014, through Rock Ridge Music. It's the first full album by the band that features no lineup change.

== Background ==
The album was recorded in the band's own studio, funded by the fans through Indiegogo. The band announced the fundraiser during a webcast upon the release of the song and video of "Obey the Beard." The studio took six months to build.

The band announced that they were making a new album during the "America F*ck Yeah" tour with bands Dog Fashion Disco and The Bunny The Bear, and played "Quack Kills" to promote it. On September 18, 2014, the band announced during a webcast that the album titled Revenge of the Vengeance was releasing November 4, and began accepting preorders for the album.

== Songs ==
- "So. Heavy." is a parody of the perceived "heaviness" of deathcore music, particularly the extremely low guitar tunings, reliance on screaming, and breakdowns. In the preceding skit, H-Flat, Josh notes that "there's no such thing as H-flat"; in certain countries the B note is written as H, which would indeed make B♭ become "H♭" or "H-flat". However, in those notations, "H♭" is either noted as "B♭" or "A♯". The song itself is in standard eight-string tuning (F♯).
- "Quack Kills" is a reference to anatidaephobia - the fictional fear that somewhere, somehow, a duck is watching you - first mentioned in Gary Larson's The Far Side.
- "Blue Screen" makes mention of GParted.
- "NSFW" is a song almost entirely composed of variations of the word "fuck"; similar to a scene from the episode "Old Cases" from The Wire. The song itself features sections of Eine kleine Nachtmusik and the finale of the 1812 Overture; Bill Manspeaker of Green Jellÿ is featured in one section where he sings the obscenity over the main riff of Three Little Pigs and Beethoven's Symphony No. 5.
- "Danger Zone", a cover of the Kenny Loggins song from Top Gun, features a mumbled rendition of "Take My Breath Away" at the end, another hit song from Top Gun.

== Track listing ==
No.	Title	Lyrics	Music	Length
1.	"Revenge of the Vengeance"			0:42
2.	"Obey the Beard"	Rzemyk, Key, Kersey	Key, Rzemyk	3:56
3.	"President Rhino"	Murphy, Kersey, Key	Murphy, Key, Rzemyk	2:12
4.	"H-Flat" (skit)			0:20
5.	"So. Heavy."	Murphy, Key, Rzemyk	Key, Rzemyk	4:48
6.	"Dogs Like Socks"	Rzemyk, Key	Key, Rzemyk	1:09
7.	"Super Legit OFFICIAL Teaser #2 Explode" (skit)			0:31
8.	"Quack Kills"	Dontre, Key, Rzemyk	Key, Dontre, Rzemyk	3:29
9.	"Blue Screen"	Murphy, Key, Rzemyk	Rzemyk, Key	4:37
10.	"NSFW"	Key	Key, Rzemyk	3:13
11.	"Danger Zone" (Kenny Loggins cover)	Tom Whitlock	Giorgio Moroder, adapted by Key and Rzemyk	3:50
12.	"New to the Neighborhood" (skit)			0:53
13.	"Loathe Thy Neighbor" (Concept by Nick Belyung)	Rzemyk, Key, Dontre, Kersey	Rzemyk, Key	4:57
14.	"AWESOME!"	Murphy, Key, Dontre, Rzemyk, Kersey	Key, Murphy, Rzemyk	3:32
15.	"Choking Hazard"	Rzemyk, New York State Department of Health	Rzemyk, Key	3:14
16.	"Fight to the Death"	Key, Murphy, Rzemyk	Key, Rzemyk	3:18
17.	"Bruce Campbell" (Concept by Nick Belyung)	Dontre, Murphy, Rzemyk, Kersey	Key, Dontre, Murphy, Rzemyk	2:40
18.	"Trick or Treat" (skit)			0:40
19.	"Dimensional Time Portal"			3:21
20.	"The Power of Metal Compels You" (Concept by Guale "Wally" Hovden)	Murphy	Key, Rzemyk	2:04
21.	"Outtakes IV: The Outtakening"			3:47

== Personnel ==
- Alex "Shmalex" Dontre – drums
- Robert "Rawrb" Kersey – lead vocals, Acoustic Guitar (Track 18)
- Joshua "The J" Key – guitars, vocals
- Matty J "Poolmoose" Rzemyk – bass, vocals

=== Additional personnel ===
- Produced By Joshua Key, Patrick Murphy, and Psychostick
- Artwork by Aljon Comahig, Patrick Murphy, Robert Kersey
- Layout by Robert Kersey, Patrick Murphy

=== Song credits ===
- Revenge of the Vengeance, Super Legit TEASER #2 Explode: Written and directed by Patrick Murphy, voiceover by David Tweats, Kevin Moran
- Obey the Beard: Jamie Doles, Matt's Grandma (SORRY, THE BEARD STAYS)
- President Rhino: Shannon Camfield, Terry Thompson, Thomas Cane, Patrick Murphy, Matt Moore
- Quack Kills: Dr. Duck Therapist: Joe Bereta
- NSFW, New to the Neighborhood, Trick or Treat: Bill Manspeaker as himself, Lori Willmer, Patrick Murphy (voice, director, writer)
- Loathe Thy Neighbor: Idea written for Indiegogo donor Nick Belyung
- Choking Hazard: Neil Patterson (Downtown Brown), Sean Farrell
- Bruce Campbell: Idea written for Indiegogo donor Nick Belyung, Stefan Cadra (marching percussion)
- Dimensional Time Portal: Idea written for Indiegogo donor Guale “Wally” Hovden, Magda Ksiasak, Amanda Dolega, Rob Nichols (Downtown Brown), the audience at Dirtfest 2014, Patrick Murphy, Matthew Kuchta, Sheena Perez, Jyn Radakovits
