= Transitshop =

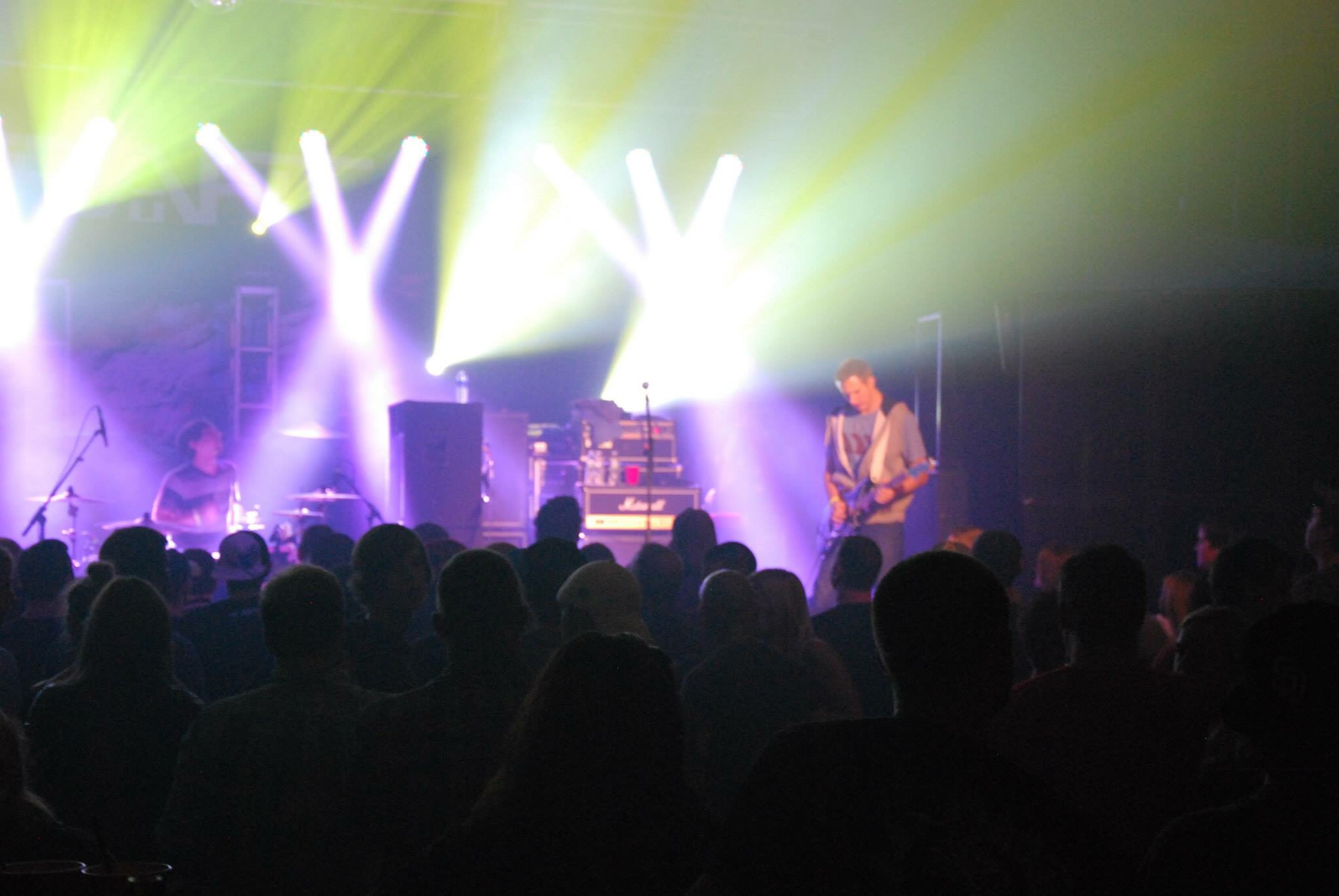
- Transitshop on tour in Charleston South Carolina in 2013

Background information
- Origin: Philadelphia, PA
- Genres: Alternative rock, indie rock, indie-pop
- Years active: 2010–present
- Label: Rock Ridge Music / Warner Music Group
- Website: transitshop.net

Transitshop is an American indie rock and alternative rock band based out of Philadelphia. Founded in 2010 by Chris O'Brien. They have released two albums and are signed to Rock Ridge Music, touring with bands such as Trapt and Candlebox.

== History ==
Philadelphia-based musician Chris O'Brien first formed Transitshop in 2010 after an injury forced him to take time off as lead guitarist for another band in 2009. "I never thought I would write songs, but when the injury slowed me down for a bit, I just started honing in on this specific sound with clean guitars, synthesizers, fast running bass-lines, and driving drums"

On their debut EP, independently released as Transitshop, O'Brien wrote the songs and also handles vocals, guitar, bass, and synthesizers. Most of the drums were handled by Michael McDermott of the Bouncing Souls. It debuted at #20 on the CMJ’s Top 200 Radio Chart, and tracks from the EP received play from over 50 national FM stations. In the summer of 2011, O'Brien met Detroit-based producer Matt Dalton (Chiodos, I See Stars, Stephen Christian of Anberlin), and Transitshop began recording their first LP in Detroit at 37 Studios with Dalton. They also recorded at Thermal Productions in New Jersey with producer Stephen McKnight, with McKnight mastering and mixing and O'Brien co-producing.

The indie pop and alternative rock album Velocity was released on Rock Ridge Music on August 13, 2013. Reviews compared the band's sound to that of new wave bands in the 80s, including the aural landscapes of "The Police, and The Cure, with a little bit of Death Cab for Cutie.". Influences such as modern pop punk and post punk were also named. In the fall of 2013 Transitshop toured with rock band Trapt in support of Velocity They have also toured and performed with bands such as Goo Goo Dolls, Alkaline Trio, Walk the Moon, A Silent Film, Candlebox, Fastball, Empires, Tantric, An Horse, and State Radio.

In early 2014 the group's single “Be There Again” made a music video debut in Guitar World.

== Members ==
- Chris O’Brien – Vocals, guitar
- Vinnie Pastore - bass guitar

== Discography ==
=== Studio albums ===
Title Album details

- Transitshop EP, Released: 2011 (not 2010), Label: Independent
- Velocity, Released: August 13, 2013, Label: Rock Ridge Music/Warner Music Group, Format: CD, download
