= Chris Volz =

American singer

- Born: Christopher Volz; August 6, 1973 (age 53)
- Origin: Bowie, Maryland, US
- Genres: Nu metal; alternative metal; hard rock
- Occupations: Singer; songwriter
- Years active: 1995–present
- Labels: Universal; Republic; Uptown; Rock Ridge; Pavement
- Member of: Flaw
- Formerly of: Five Bolt Main

Christopher Volz (born August 6, 1973) is an American singer who is best known as the lead vocalist of the nu metal band Flaw and as the former lead vocalist of Five Bolt Main. In 2007, Volz released a solo album through the independent record label Rock Ridge Music, titled Redemption. The collective projects of Volz have sold around 750,000 units in the United States (most of which with Flaw). Volz and the band appeared on The Late Show with Stephen Colbert in 2018.

== Music career ==
On November 16, 2009, Flaw independently released Home Grown Studio Sessions. This is the first new material to be released by Flaw since Endangered Species in 2004.

Volz announced that he was trying to rekindle relationships with other members of Flaw to release their fourth studio album and an EP by mid-2012 with a DVD release to follow, as well as work on Five.Bolt.Main material and solo material. He also announced that Flaw will be touring in mid-March.

On July 17, 2013, it was announced that the band had returned to the "Through the Eyes" lineup of Volz, Jason Daunt, Lance Arny, Ryan Juhrs and Chris Ballinger. They have stated they are working on a new album and rehearsing for live shows in August 2013.

In March 2021, multiple publications reported that Volz had repeatedly used racial slurs at a concert, leading to him being dropped by the record label that distributes his side project and solo albums.

In 2022 Flaw released their latest full-length album in almost 5 years titled "Revival" with an associated tour.

== Biography ==
Chris Volz grew up in the Maryland area, studying music at an early age. He currently is based in Wisconsin. During his childhood, Volz was raised by his father Joe and until he was 11 or 12, his adoptive mother Helga. At the age of 2, Volz was adopted by Helga, a female singer. Helga taught him about music. When he was 11 or 12, Helga died by suicide.

Volz cites jazz, classical, and metal music as some of his influences. His singing style consists of both melodic singing and intense screaming vocals. The songs "Whole" from the Flaw album Through the Eyes and "The Gift" from the Five.Bolt.Main album Venting are about Helga. He spoke about the Flaw song "Whole" and Helga, saying, "Everything in that song touches from sadness to anger to grief to blaming myself to confusion... I just really wanted to go as deep into it as I possibly could and still be able to come back. She was the one who got me into music. She was an operatic singer, and for me to go wholly into music has kept a part of her alive inside of me." He said that before he found out Helga adopted him, he thought she was his birth mom.

After Helga committed suicide, Volz started disrespecting authority figures such as his teachers and his father Joe. Joe shipped him off to military school. Volz ran away from school to hang out with his neighborhood friends. According to Joe, Volz got "quickly booted out for using drugs and lying about it". This got Volz sent by Joe to various juvenile detention centers. Volz was sent to a long-term drug rehab center after Joe caught him with a homemade bong. Volz ran away from rehab and then was picked up by police and subsequently put in a juvenile detention center. The court decided he was not a candidate for rehab, and Joe was told by the police to take his son back. This made Joe embittered with his son. Volz attended Bowie High School in Maryland but dropped out. After his childhood, Volz started getting along with Joe. Joe was the best man at Volz's wedding.

== Discography ==
Date of release	Title	Label	Notes	Sales
1997	American Arrogance	None	First independent release as the singer for nu metal/alternative metal band Flaw.	–
1998	Flaw	None	Second independently released Flaw album.	–
2000	Drama	None	Third independent release for Flaw.	–
October 20, 2001	Through the Eyes	Universal Records	The first major label release from Flaw.	480,000 +
May 4, 2004	Endangered Species	Universal Records	Last release before being dropped from Universal Records and disbanding.	27,527 copies in its first week
September 13, 2005	Venting	Rock Ridge Music	After Flaw disbanded, Chris would co-found Five.Bolt.Main. This would be their one and only release containing studio material.	30,000+ (Soundscan numbers from July 2007)
October 10, 2006	Live	Rock Ridge Music	The first and only Live album released by Five Bolt Main	3,000+ (Soundscan numbers from July 2007)
September 11, 2007	Redemption	Rock Ridge Music	This album was the first album from Chris Volz' solo project.	The album sold approximately 700 copies in its first week of release
February 5, 2008	Complete	Rock Ridge Music	This compilation album was the last release by Five.Bolt.Main after disbanding	
November 16, 2009	Home Grown Studio Sessions	None	Fourth independent release for Flaw	Only 3,000 hard produced copies of the CD were made making it limited edition.
August 2016	Divided We Fall	Pavement Entertainment	First studio album by Flaw since 2004.	
September 1, 2017	United We Stand	Pavement Music	EP released by Flaw	
July 19, 2019	Vol IV Because of the Brave	Pavement Music	Fifth studio album by Flaw	
March 4, 2022	Revival	Cleopatra Records	Sixth studio album by Flaw	
