= Venting (album) =

Studio album by Five.Bolt.Main
- Released: September 13, 2005
- Recorded: 2005
- Genre: Nu metal
- Length: 43:54
- Label: Rock Ridge
- Producer: Jason Spiewak

Five.Bolt.Main chronology
Venting (2005)	Live (2006)

Singles from Venting
- 1. "Pathetic" Released: 2005; 2. "The Gift" Released: 2006; 3. "Seem to be Fine" Released: 2006

Professional ratings
Review scores
Source	Rating
AllMusic	2.5/5 stars
Metal Underground	3/5 stars

Venting is the debut album and sole studio album by the nu metal music group Five.Bolt.Main. It was released on September 13, 2005 via Rock Ridge Music. Three singles were released from the album: "Pathetic" (2005), "The Gift" (2006), and "Seem to Be Fine" (2006). Venting sold roughly around 20,000 copies.

== Track listing ==
1. "The Gift" – 2:50
2. "Pathetic" – 4:08
3. "Wait in Line" – 3:34
4. "Broken Compass" – 3:53
5. "What You Are" – 3:39
6. "Slip" – 3:56
7. "Breathing" – 3:30
8. "Seem to Be Fine" – 4:10
9. "Life of Mine" – 3:26
10. "Descending" – 3:47
11. "Made Like This" – 3:31
12. "Bid Farewell" – 3:30

== Personnel ==
The following lineup featured on Venting – and was the original lineup for Five.Bolt.Main.

- Chris Volz – vocals
- Aaron Welenken – guitar
- Jason Chandler – guitar
- Ben Patrick – bass
- Ivan Arnold – drums

== In media ==
In 2009, Five.Bolt.Main's song "The Gift" was used as the official song of "PWO Wrestlelution 2: A Coming of Age," a wrestling event that aired on "Pro Wrestling Ohio" TV in the state of Ohio.

== Music videos ==
- "Pathetic" (2005)
- "The Gift" (2006)
