= Psychostick =

American comedy rock band

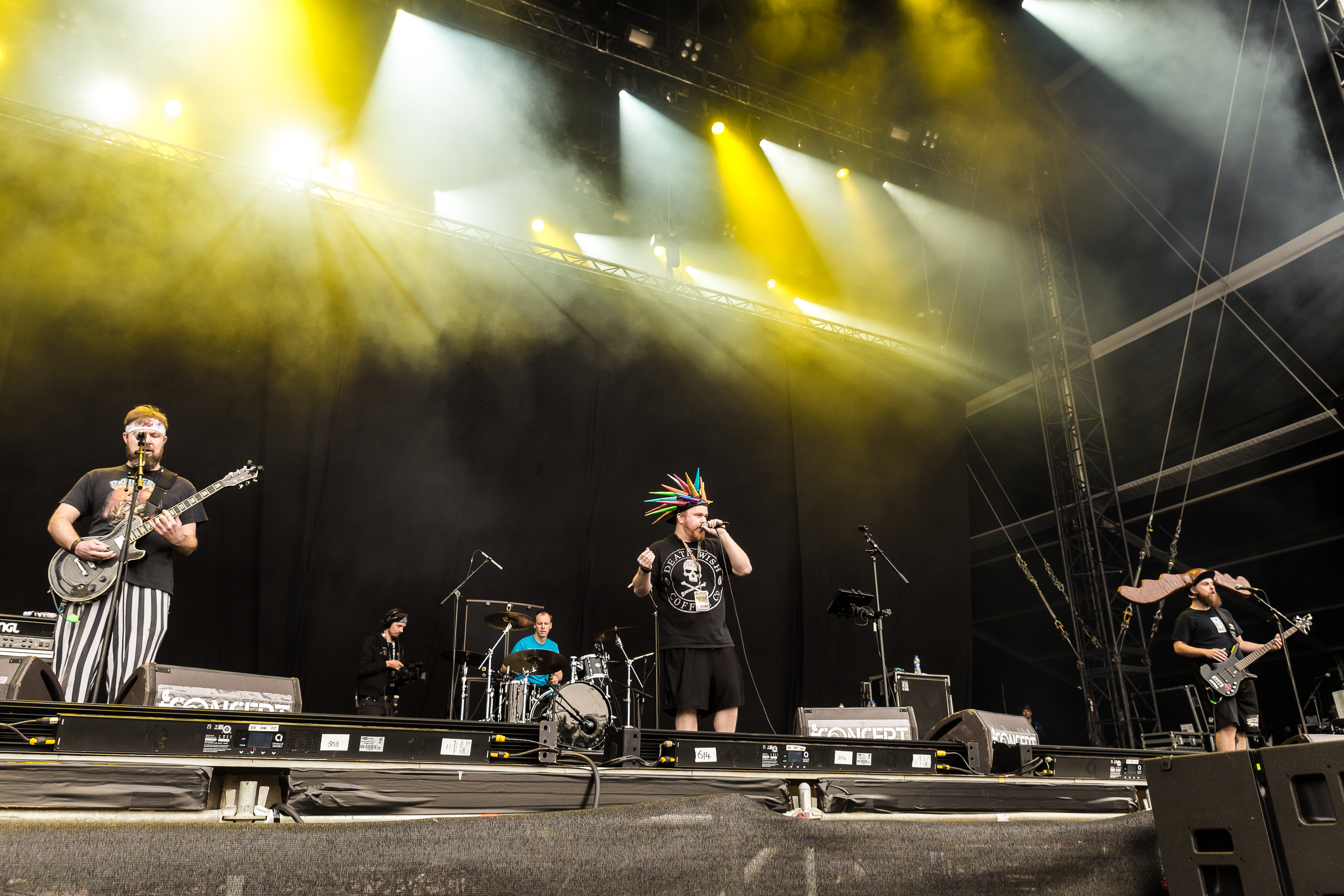
- Psychostick performing at With Full Force festival in 2018

Background information
- Also known as: Asinine (1990s–2001)
- Origin: Tempe, Arizona, U.S.
- Genres: Comedy rock; metalcore; groove metal; hardcore punk; alternative metal; nu metal; funk metal
- Years active: 2000–present
- Label: Rock Ridge
- Members: Rob "Rawrb" Kersey; Alex "Shmalex" Dontre; Josh "The J" Key
- Past members: Hunter Alexander; Mike "MiketheEvil" Kocian; Vince "V" Johansen; Jake "Jakermeister" McReynolds; Jimmy "Jimmychanga" Grant; Matty J "Moose" Rzemyk
- Website: psychostick.com

Psychostick is an American comedy metal band from Tempe, Arizona, known for their comical image and usage of humor in their songs and lyrics. Their style is referred to by themselves and some online album review sites as "humorcore".

To date they have released six albums nationally. Their debut album, We Couldn't Think of a Title, was released on May 16, 2003. Their second album, Sandwich, was released on May 5, 2009, and their third album, titled Space Vampires vs Zombie Dinosaurs in 3D, was released August 16, 2011. Their fourth album was released on the fourth of November in 2014 titled IV: Revenge of the Vengeance. Their latest album was released on July 24, 2018, during a webcast Do. They began touring nationally in July 2006, and have toured with Mushroomhead, Look What I Did, Powerglove, Bobaflex, and have played with many national bands, including Three Days Grace, Army of Anyone, Sick Puppies, Anew Revolution, The Exies, Smile Empty Soul, as well as many others.

== History ==
=== Origins and early years (2000–2003) ===
Around the 1990s in Odessa, Texas, the first inception of Psychostick existed under the name "Asinine", with the line-up consisting of Josh Key on vocals, Steve W. on guitar, Marvin S. on bass, and Bozzy C. on percussion. In 2000, Key ended Asinine and moved to Phoenix, Arizona, to follow high-school friend and future vocalist Rob Kersey. Needing to complete the line-up, they found drummer Alex Preiss, through an ad in the local "musicians wanted" section of the Phoenix New Times and through Alex, found bassist Hunter Alexander and played shows under the new name, "Psychostick". The band released two initial demo tapes, "Don't Bitch, It's Free" (September 2000) and "Die... A Lot!" (August 2001). Uninterested in the comedy-metal genre, Alexander departed from the band in December 2001, and was replaced by Mike Kocian.

=== We Couldn't Think of a Title and early success (2003–2007) ===
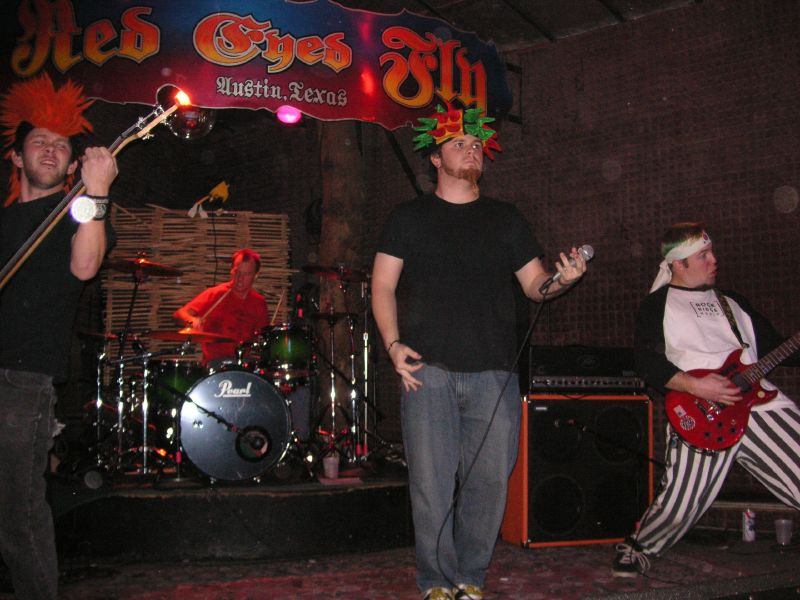
Psychostick performing in Austin, Texas, in 2006. From left to right: Mike Kocian, Alex Dontre, Rob Kersey, and Josh Key.

On May 16, 2003, the band self-released their debut album, We Couldn't Think of a Title, from which, after their record deal with Rock Ridge Records, was re-released on September 12, 2006. The album has had minor chart success in the US, reaching No. 41 on the Billboard's Top Heatseekers, No. 4 on the Billboard's Top Heatseekers (West North Central), and No. 48 on the Billboard's Top Independent Albums. The album contained the song "Beer!", which would go on to be one of their most well-known songs. Psychostick gained notoriety in spring 2007, when their song "Beer" received heavy airplay on XM Radio's Liquid Metal show for seven weeks.

The band, with additional guitarist Vince "V" Johansen, commenced touring nationally on June 13, 2006, playing alongside Bobaflex, as well as Indorphine, for the first few weeks. Johansen would leave the band in late 2006. On September 25, 2007, the band released their holiday EP, The Flesh Eating Roller Skate Holiday Joyride. It was originally intended as a split album with Indorphine but who were unable to find the time to work on their half of the album. The holiday EP was mildly successful, reaching No. 18 on Billboard's Top Holiday Albums. The stress of touring caused bassist Kocian to part ways with the band in 2007.

=== Sandwich (2008–2009) ===
Around the time of Kocian's departure from Psychostick, Indorphine disbanded after touring with Psychostick on the Holiday Hate 2007 tour in December. Needing a new bassist, the band contacted Indorphine vocalist Jimmy Grant to fill in the vacant bass slot. The band also recruited rhythm guitarist Jake McReynolds, figuring "they would do it all at once" since they were going through a line-up change. The band then embarked on their first tour with the 5-piece lineup, entitled the "Holy Crap We're Touring" tour, on February 6, 2008.

In late 2008, the band went into the studio to record their second album, Sandwich. It was the band's first studio album since their 2003 debut album. The album finished production in January 2009 and was released on May 5, 2009, or, as the band calls it, "Psycho de Mayo". The album enjoyed the same success as their debut album, peaking at No. 15 on the Billboard's Top Heatseekers and No. 41 on the Billboard's Top Independent Albums.

The band then toured in celebration of the album's release, sharing select dates with 9mm Solution, Screaming Mechanical Brain, Severed Nerve, Saved By Ruin, and Diabase. In December 2009, after the Holiday Hate Tour: Season 3 tour, Jimmy Grant left the band for reasons unknown, followed by Jake McReynolds later in April 2010.

=== Space Vampires vs Zombie Dinosaurs in 3D (2010–2013) ===
Soon after releasing an EP The Digital Appetizer (with Joshy playing both guitar and bass on the EP), the band recruited Matty J. "Moose" Rzemyk through mutual acquaintance Billy Rymer, drummer of The Dillinger Escape Plan. The band then started the Parental Advisory Tour, playing with Green Jellÿ and Nashville Pussy. The band announced during a webcast on November 4, 2010, that they are working on their new album to be released in summer 2011. The title of the new album, Space Vampires vs Zombie Dinosaurs in 3D, was announced on another webcast on March 10, 2011, and the band has said that it will have a "Tentative August 2011 release date" through Rock Ridge Music. Through the band's Facebook on July 12, the album release was given an official date of August 16, 2011.

In early 2011, Josh started working with an authoring company on putting Psychostick songs for sale on Rock Band Network. On January 19, 2012, "Beer!" was released on the Xbox 360's Rock Band Network and is playable on Rock Band 3. On June 28, 2012, "Political Bum" was released. On February 1, 2013, "This is Not a Song, It's a Sandwich!" was released.

=== Crowdfunding campaigns, Revenge of the Vengeance and Do (2013–2019) ===
In November 2013, the band started a crowdfunding campaign to build a studio, which would serve both to produce their next album, but also to produce other content like music videos and short films. The goal was successfully met a month later. The band's fourth album was released on November 4, 2014. On September 18, Psychostick live streamed for two hours, announcing the title of their fourth album IV: Revenge of the Vengeance, the release date (November 4, 2014), and the preorder packages.

In July 2018, the band surprise released their fifth album Do; it's their first album released independently after their contract with Rock Ridge Music expired. The album has gone on to chart on Billboard as No. 1 Comedy Album, No. 6 Heatseekers East North Central, No. 14 Hard Rock Albums, No. 6 Heatseekers West North Central, No. 39 Rock Albums, No. 39 Independent Albums, No. 7 Heatseekers Mountain, No. 9 Heatseekers

Psychostick premiered their newest single, "Rent in Peace" on August 22, 2019. James Rolfe who is best known to star as the Angry Video Game Nerd appears in the video.

=== Pandemic live stream concerts and ... and Stuff (2020–present) ===
During the COVID-19 pandemic, the band continued to play weekly concerts over Twitch and YouTube, with viewer donations keeping the band afloat; half the donations would go to charity. On December 15, the band announced Key would take a brief hiatus from the band for family reasons. Key would later return to the band on their weekly concert stream on February 18, and appear in subsequent streams.

On February 24, 2022, the band announced during their Twitch concert that they were releasing a compilation of b-sides and rarities titled ... and Stuff. The album was released on April 14, 2022, and debuted at No. 2 on Billboard's Comedy Albums and No. 57 on the Current Albums.

On January 22, 2024, the band announced via Facebook and their website that they had parted ways with Matty J Moose, citing creative differences.

== Musical style and lyrical themes ==
Most of Psychostick's lyrics revolve around observational comedy, food, binge drinking, broken relationships, and occasional pop culture references. Running gags include the repeated misspelling of the band's name, and the band's supposed unpopularity or the pigeonholing of the band as the band who plays the "Beer Is Good" song. Some songs are parodies of various themes of music, such as love songs (Orgasm = Love), sad, depressing songs (Prozak Milkshake) or radio rock (No. 1 Radio $ingle). The band often makes use of short skits between songs, but occurrences of humor and scripted comedy also happen mid-song.

Psychostick mixes influences from funk metal (particularly prevalent on We Couldn't Think of a Title), groove metal and nu metal. The band initially labelled themselves as "humorcore" as a joke, referencing a trend of the various "-core" genres at the time; Rawrb notes that "comedy metal is a better descriptor" of the band's music.

Although lyrically rich in humor, unlike many bands who tend to use a lot of comedy, the instrumental portions of the songs are not neglected and are very serious. When interviewed about their style, Rawrb often compares how serious the band takes their music and lyrical content to how serious a comedian takes their comedy. He will often correct the interviewer saying, "We're comedic musicians that take every part of this band very seriously." guitarist Joshy often reminds those who are curious that Psychostick is "serious about being dumb". Both We Couldn't Think of a Title and Space Vampires vs Zombie Dinosaurs in 3D contained instrumental songs, but not without humour: "Largiloquent Dithyramb"'s only lyrics are "DOG FOOD / TASTES GOOD / WITH CHEESE", while "Six Pounds of Terror" is played over the growling of an agitated Maltese dog. The music is entirely produced by the band; guitarist Josh is responsible for the engineering and mixdown.

=== Live performances ===
During live shows and in videos, the band dons specific outfits (a spiky hat for Rawrb, a hachimaki for Josh and large moose antlers for Matty) and uses goofy prop comedy with objects like rubber chickens, stuffed animals or their instruments. Vocalist Rawrb has been known to use a Guitar Hero guitar and a tennis racket during performances.

They have played a number of unrecorded songs live, including "The World's Shortest Song" (during "The Holiday Hate Tour" they called it "The World's Shortest Christmas Song". During the "Sandwich CD Release Party Tour" they called it "The Whole Sandwich Album in 0.4 Seconds"), "Teenage Mutant Ninja Turtles", "The Sombrero Prophecy", "The Log Song" (a slinky parody from The Ren and Stimpy Show), the Aqua Teen Hunger Force theme song, "Happy Birthday", "HURRY UP!!" (a song played live for when a band member has to make an instrument repair) a rendition of Gloria Estefan's "Conga" (Rob and Josh each drag out a drum head and do some percussion themselves during the song), and Rick Astley's "Never Gonna Give You Up", in a live attempt at rickrolling. More recently, Psychostick "metaled-up" several songs including "Danger Zone" by Kenny Loggins, the theme from Angry Birds and a mash-up of "Push It" by Static-X and "Push It" by Salt-n-Pepa. In their newest tour, called the "Our Tour Can Beat Up Your Tour Tour", the band covered the main theme from the Chemical Plant Zone in Sonic the Hedgehog 2.

== Band members ==
=== Current members ===
Psychostick live at With Full Force 2018

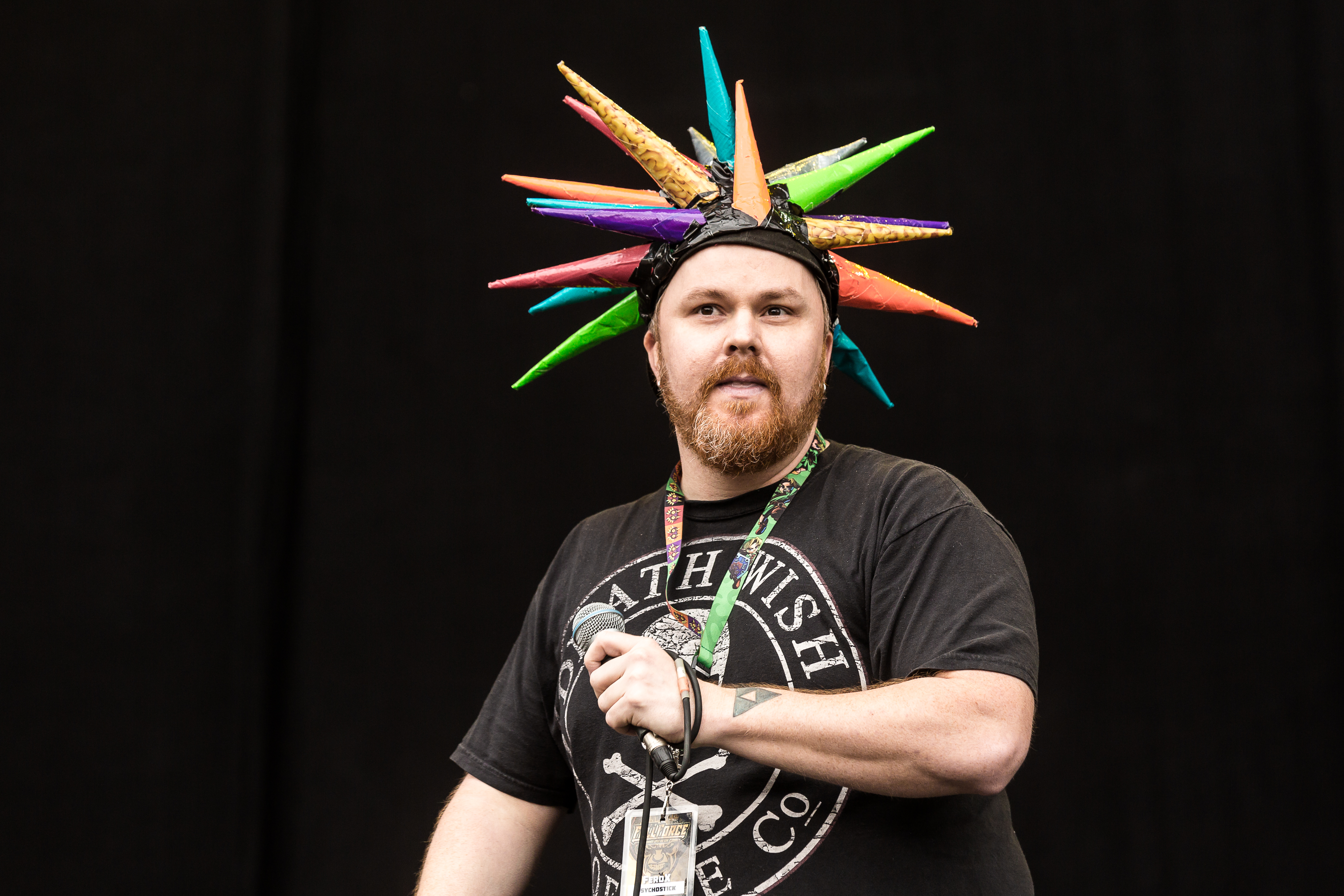
Rob Kersey

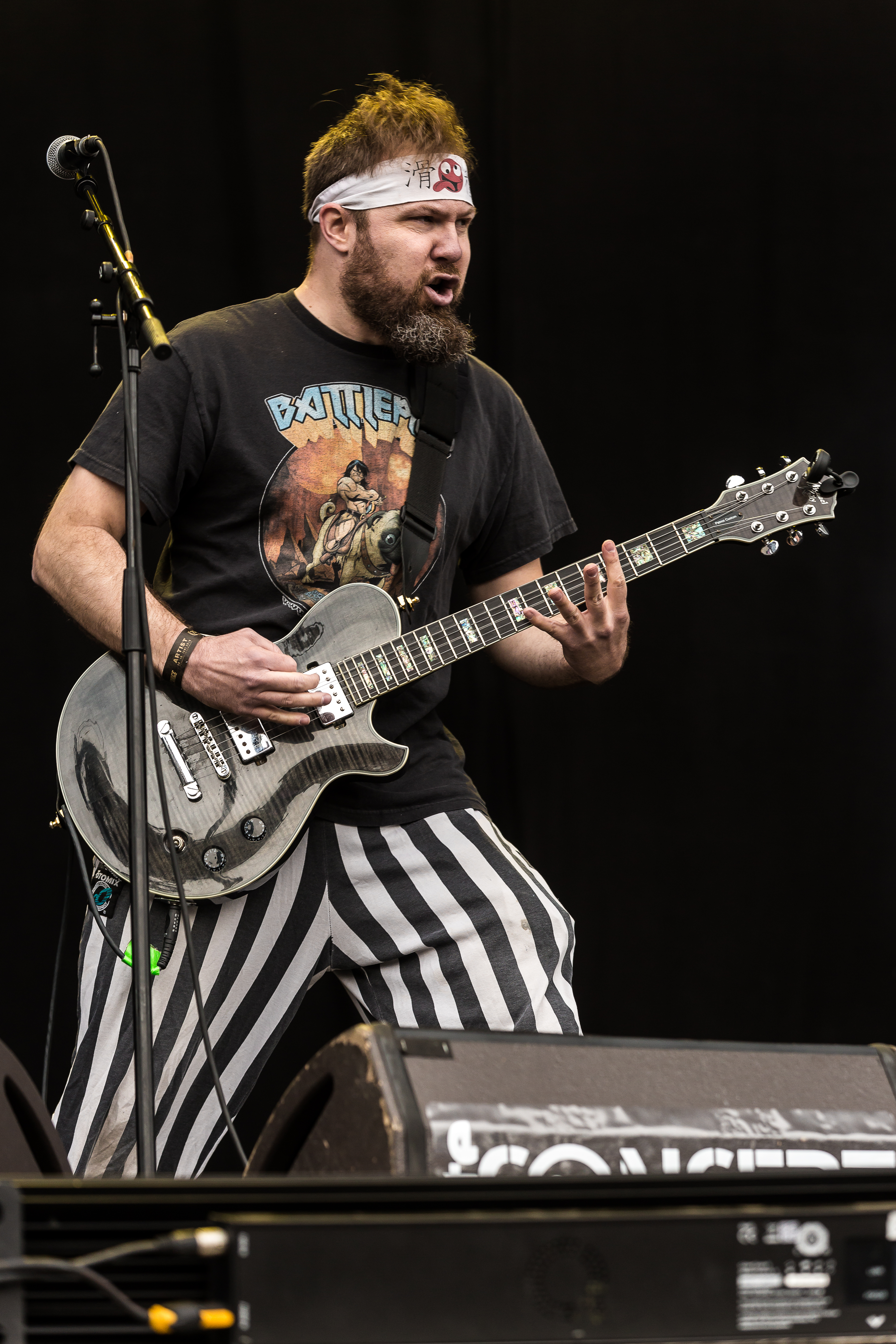
Josh Key

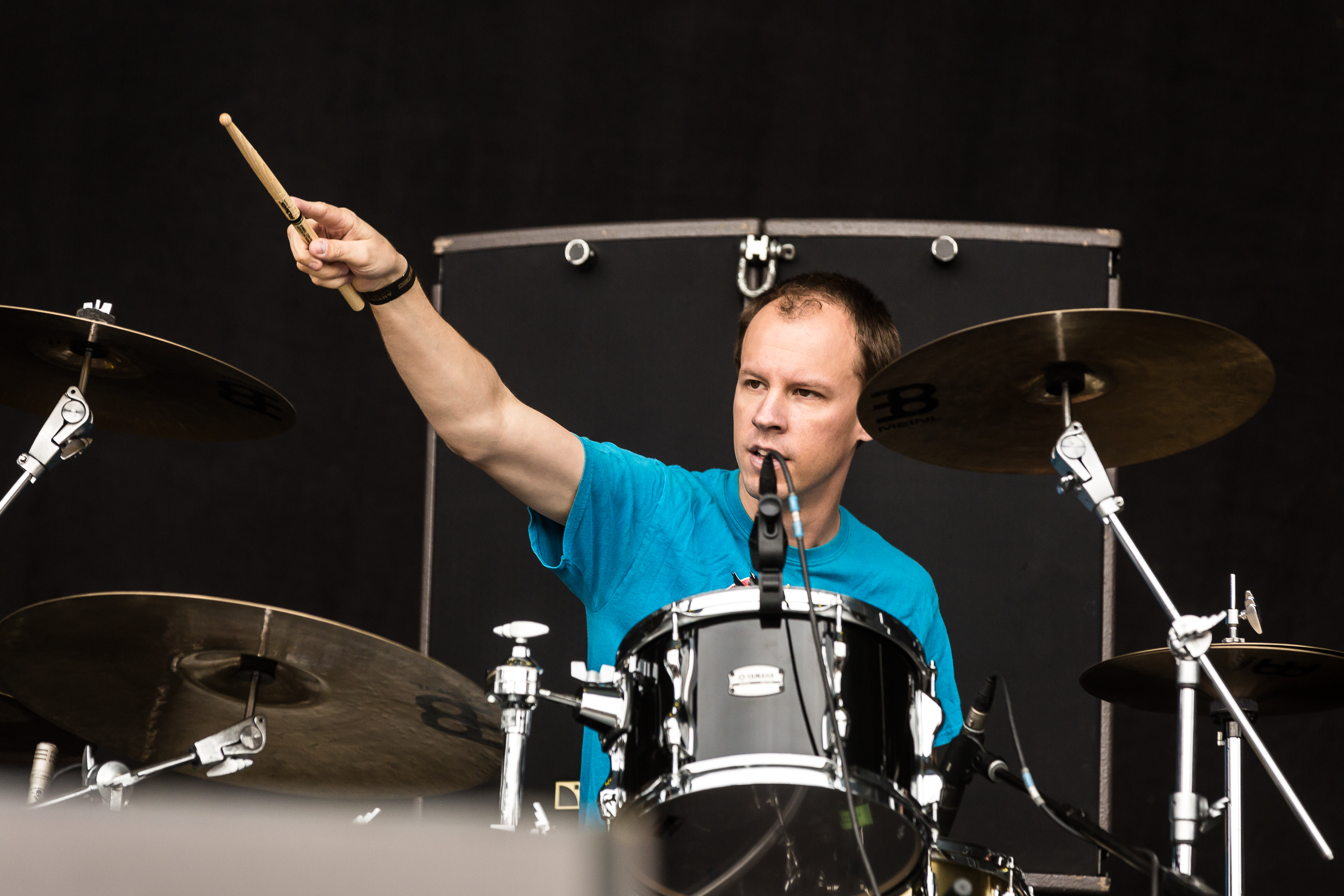
Alex Dontre
- Rob "Rawrb" Kersey – lead vocals (2000–present)
- Josh "Joshy/The J" Key – guitars, vocals (2000–present)
- Alex "Shmalex/The Boy" Dontre (formerly Preiss) – drums (2000–present)

=== Former members ===
- Hunter Alexander – bass (2000–2001)
- Mike "Mike Hawkizzard" Kocian – bass, backing vocals (2001–2007)
- Vince "V" Johansen – guitar (2004–2006)
- Jake "Jakermeister" McReynolds – guitars, backing vocals (2008-2010; died 2024)
- Jimmy "Jimmychanga" Grant – bass, vocals (2008–2009)
- Matty J "Moose" Rzemyk – bass, vocals (2010–2024)

=== Touring members ===
- Jesse "Turff" McInturff – rhythm guitar (Holiday Hate Tour 2007)
- Cassidy Nee – bass (Holiday Hate Tour 2007)
- Rev. John Wheeler IV – guest vocals on live performances of "Beer!" (Holiday Hate Tour 2007)
- Billy Rymer – drums (September 2010)
- Elliot Mapes – drums for 3 shows ('Merica! F*** Yeah! Tour 2014)
- Rob "Manny" Whisenhunt – guitar for 2 shows (REALLY Ugly Americans Tour 2015)
- Chris "ChrisGPT" Gardner - bass (2024–present)

== Discography ==
Studio albums

- We Couldn't Think of a Title (2003)
- Sandwich (2009)
- Space Vampires vs Zombie Dinosaurs in 3D (2011)
- IV: Revenge of the Vengeance (2014)
- Do (2018)
