= Five.Bolt.Main =

American nu metal band

- Also known as: Silent Q, Vent
- Origin: Louisville, Kentucky, U.S.
- Genres: Nu metal, alternative metal
- Years active: 2004–2007, 2009–2011
- Label: Rock Ridge
- Past members: Chris Volz; Ivan Arnold; Aaron Welenken; Jason Chandler; Ben Patrick; Alex Cando; Ronny Paige; Dave Crabtree; Aaron Fishel; Jamison Lee
- Website: fiveboltmain.com

Five.Bolt.Main was an American nu metal band from Louisville, Kentucky.

== History ==
=== Debut album and live albums (2004–2007) ===
Five.Bolt.Main debuted with their album Venting On September 13, 2001. October 10, 2006, Rock Ridge released Live, which was recorded in Louisville during their 2006 tour.

=== Unreleased material, reunion and break up (2007–present) ===
Plans to release a compilation, titled Complete, were in the works, though no substantive new material had been recorded by the band except the pre-production demos of the songs "Just My Luck" and "Blackout" that were co-produced by Chris Henderson, guitarist of 3 Doors Down, in his recording studio in Biloxi, Mississippi. Regardless, Rock Ridge released Complete in 2008 despite the fact that most members of the band had not consented to its release, citing poor sound quality.

On February 28, 2007, a press release from Rock Ridge Music stated that Five.Bolt.Main had disbanded, and Chris Volz would release a solo album in the fall of 2007.

== Discography ==
=== Studio albums ===
Date of Release	Title	Label
September 13, 2005	Venting	Rock Ridge

=== Compilation albums ===
- Live (2006)
- Complete (2008)

=== Singles ===
Year	Song	U.S. Mainstream Rock	Album
2005	"Pathetic"	-	Venting
2006	"The Gift"	#38	Venting
2006	"Seem To Be Fine"	-	Venting
