= We Couldn't Think of a Title =

Studio album by Psychostick
- Released: May 16, 2003
- Recorded: Headpop Studios; Joshy Apartment Studios; Robby's crappy Yet Effective Vocal Booth
- Genre: Comedy rock; hardcore punk; nu metal
- Length: 68:07; 71:42 (reissue)
- Label: Self-released; Rock Ridge (reissue)
- Producer: Joshua Key; Psychostick

Psychostick chronology
The Best Sampler Ever! (for some reason) (2003)	We Couldn't Think of a Title (2003)	The Flesh Eating Roller Skate Holiday Joyride (2007)

Singles from We Couldn't Think of a Title
- 1. "BEER!" Released: 2006; 2. "Two Ton Paperweight" Released: 2006

Professional ratings
Review scores
Source	Rating
Allmusic	4/5 stars

We Couldn't Think of a Title is the debut studio album by American comedy metal band Psychostick. It features Psychostick's brand of metal/hardcore mixed with humor, with some of the tracks being comedy skits or transitions to other songs, like "Death Burger", "Indecision" (which is a recurring skit throughout the album), and "Good Morning". Originally self-released on May 16, 2003. This album also contains their most successful track, "BEER!!!".

We Couldn't Think of a Title reached #41 on the Billboard's Top Heatseekers, #4 on the Billboard's Top Heatseeker's (West North Central), and #48 on the Top Independent Albums.

== Track listing ==
All tracks are written by Psychostick (Robert Kersey, Joshua Key, Mike Kocian, and Alex Preiss).

No.	Title	Length
1.	"Indecision"	0:58
2.	"Scrotal Torment"	2:58
3.	"Two Ton Paperweight"	4:32
4.	"Death Burger!"	0:53
5.	"No Pun Intended"	0:09
6.	"Why, Oh, Why?"	5:09
7.	"Pluh"	5:50
8.	"BEER!!"	2:13
9.	"Prozak Milkshake"	5:54
10.	"Throwin' Down"	5:17
11.	"I HATE Doing Laundry"	0:27
12.	"Return of the Death Burger!"	0:23
13.	"Largiloquent Dithyramb"	5:06
14.	"Lizard Sphere X"	2:30
15.	"Orgasm = Love"	4:47
16.	"Good Morning"	1:37
17.	"In a Band to Get Chicks"	4:11
18.	"Fake My Own Death and Go Platinum / Hidden Track!!!!!!"	15:26
19.	"ABCDEath" (2006 reissue track)	1:07
20.	"The Jagermeister Love Song" (2006 reissue track)	2:28

=== B-sides ===
- "Hokey Fuckin' Pokey" — 3:42 (B-side released by the band through BitTorrent. Eventually included in digital platform releases of We Couldn't Think of a Title.)
- "Those Stupid Ifs" - 5:17 (B-side released by the band through BitTorrent. Eventually included in the 2022 compilation album ... and Stuff.)

=== Alternate releases ===
The releases on Spotify and iTunes exclude the skits "Indecision", "Death Burger!", "Return of the Death Burger!", "Lizard Sphere X", and the hidden track from "Fake My Own Death and Go Platinum". However, they include the track "Hokey Fuckin' Pokey".

== Personnel ==
Psychostick

- Robert "The Notorious R.O.B." Kersey (Lead vocals)
- Joshua "Special J" Key (Lead and rhythm guitar, backing vocals)
- Mike "Hawkizzard" Kocian (Bass guitar, backing vocals)
- Alex "The Boy" Preiss (Drums and percussion, bird noises) co-lead vocals (16)
- Guest Appearances:
  - "BEER!" – Brian Navarro (answering beer part), Crack Money Records, Biomech, Detox, Digital E, Halfgain, Makeshift, Headcreep, This, The Washingtons, and Wisdom of Eternity.
  - "Throwin' Down" – Lindsey Hans
  - "Orgasm = Love" – Becky Williams
  - "Fake My Own Death and Go Platinum" – Shannon Siggins and Becky Williams
  - "Lizard Sphere X" – Big Daddy Crack and Double Dee
  - "Jagermeister Love Song" – Vince "V" Johansen
- All songs written and performed by Psychostick
- Drums Recorded by Scott Seymann at Headpop Studios
- Guitars and Bass Recorded at Joshy Apartment Studios
- Vocals Recorded at Robby's Crappy Yet Effective Vocal Booth
- Produced by Joshua Key and Psychostick
- Mixed and Engineered by Joshua Key
- Mastered by Dave Shirk at Sonorus Mastering Inc.
- Kickdrum Triggering by Ted Preiss
- Artwork by Robert "Rawrb" Kersey
- "The Dumb" street team led by Tony Schiavo and Alex Preiss

== Chart performance ==
Chart (2006)	Peak position
US Billboard Top Heatseekers	41
US Billboard Top Heatseekers (North West Central)	4
US Billboard Top Independent Albums	48

== Trivia ==
Psychostick's musical influences are mentioned during a skit following the song 'Pluh' (but within the same track on the album), in which the band continues discussing potential album names for their release. For example, one band-member suggests naming the album 'Destroy Erase Chaosphere,' which references two of Meshuggah's studio albums. Other musical acts mentioned are Pantera and Sevendust.
