= Rock Ridge Music =

US independent music label

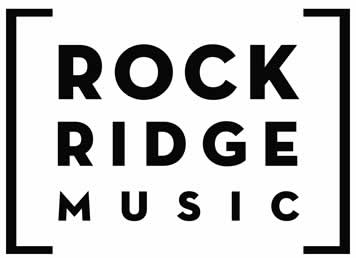
- Founded: 2004
- Founder: Tom Derr, Chris Henderson, Jason Spiewak
- Distributor: ADA (Warner Music Group)
- Genre: Various
- Country of origin: U.S.
- Location: Nashville, Tennessee
- Official website: www.rockridgemusic.com

Rock Ridge Music is an independent record label and artist management company based in Nashville, Tennessee. Founded in 2004, it has signed, managed, and/or promoted artists including Reel Big Fish, Sister Hazel, Rachel Platten, Matthew Perryman Jones, Tony Lucca, Matt Hires, The Damnwells, Attack! Attack!, The Ike Reilly Assassination, Psychostick, and Fiction Family.

== History ==
Rock Ridge Music was founded in 2004 by Tom Derr in Washington Crossing, PA along with partners Chris Henderson and Jason Spiewak. CEO Derr was the former Vice-President of Marketing and Artist Development for Universal Records, and had also previously worked at RCA Records and A&M Records. Chris Henderson, guitarist for modern rock group 3 Doors Down, joined in 2004 and went on to become Vice President of A&R for the label. Based in Newark, NJ from 2007-2014, the company opened a Nashville, TN office at the beginning of 2014 and moved the base of their operation there in 2015.

In 2005, Cynthia Cochrane joined as a partner, serving as General Manager and Creative Director from 2006 to 2012. She had previously held positions at Universal Motown Records Group, Capitol Records, Blue Note Records and BMG Music. Cochrane was named President in 2013 following Spiewak’s departure from the company.

Rock Ridge Music's first release, The Ike Reilly Assassination's Sparkle In The Finish, hit stores on October 12, 2004. The company was launched as a full-service independent record label and subsequently added management and marketing consulting services as well. The label has released albums from artists such as Reel Big Fish, Psychostick, Fiction Family, Rachel Platten and others. Management clients include Hugh Masterson, JD Eicher, Owen Danoff, Tony Lucca, Ike Reilly, George Shingleton, Anna Renee, Zena Carpenter and Roger Street Friedman as well as previous management roster acts such as Sister Hazel, Matt Hires, Pat McGee, Christian Lopez (musician) and Ingram Hill.

Their marketing division, Rock Ridge Marketing, has worked with artists signed to a number labels, including majors such as J Records, Decca, A&M/Octone and RCA, and indies such as Chime Entertainment, TVT Records, and Razor & Tie. They have worked on campaigns for acts including Daughtry, Better Than Ezra, Collective Soul, Blackberry Smoke, Buckcherry, Barry Manilow and Rod Stewart.

== Distribution ==
Rock Ridge Music distributes hard copies of music, merchandise, digital music, and other media internationally. Their CDs are distributed by Alternative Distribution Alliance (Warner Music Group).

== See also ==
- List of independent record labels
