= Jared =

Name list

- Pronunciation: /ˈdʒærəd/
- Gender: Male

Origin
- Language: Hebrew

Other names
- Related names: Gared, Gerad, Gered, Jarad, Jareth, Jarid, Jarod, Jarrad, Jarred, Jarrid, Jarrod, Jarryd, Jaryd, Jhared, Jerad, Jered, Jerid, Jerod, Jerrad, Jerred, Jerrid, Jerrod, Yared, Yered

Jared is a given name of Biblical derivation.

== Origin ==
In the Book of Genesis, the biblical patriarch Jared (יֶרֶד) was the sixth in the ten pre-flood generations between Adam and Noah; he was the son of Mahalaleel and the father of Enoch, and lived 962 years (Genesis 5:18). The biblical text in the Book of Jubilees implicitly etymologizes the name as derived from the root YRD "descend" because in his days, "the angels of the Lord descended to earth". Alternative suggestions for the name's etymology include words for "rose", "servant" and "one who rules".

In some English-speaking countries, Jared is a common Jewish and Christian first name.

== People ==
=== Arts, entertainment, and media ===
- Jared Abrahamson (born 1987), Canadian actor
- Jared Allman (born 1984), American actor
- Jared Anderson (Christian musician) (born 1979), American musician and Christian worship leader
- Jared Anderson (heavy metal musician) (1974–2006), American musician
- Jared Angira (born 1947), Kenyan poet and author
- Jared Angle, American ballet dancer
- Jared Artaud, American musician
- Jared Maurice Arter (1850–1930), American author and former slave
- Jared Ball (born 1971), American author and radio host
- Jared "Drake" Bell (born 1986), American actor and singer
- Jared Blake (born 1978), American musician and actor
- Jared Bowen, American journalist and reporter
- Jared Breeze (born 2005), American child actor
- Jared Bush (born 1974), American screenwriter and television producer
- Jared Byers, American musician
- Jared Carter (born 1939), American author and editor
- Jared Campbell (born 1989), American stand-up comedian and former football player
- Jared Cohn, American film director, screenwriter, and actor
- Jared Cohon (born 1947), American author, editor, engineer
- Jared Cole, American physicist
- Jared Colinger, American musician
- Jared Cotter (born 1981), American musician
- Jared Curtis (born 1936), American author and editor
- Jared Daperis (born 1990), Australian actor
- Jared DePasquale (born 1971), American film, television, and audio drama composer
- Jared Diamond (born 1937), American scientist and author
- Jared Dines (born 1989), American musician and YouTuber
- Jared Eliot (1685–1763) American colonial minister, physician and agronomist
- Jared Emerson-Johnson (born 1981), American video game music composer and voice actor
- Jared Evan (born 1989), American musician
- Jared Bradley Flagg (1820–1899), American painter
- Jared Faber, American film, television producer, and musician
- Jared Falk (born 1981), Canadian musician
- Jared Farmer (born 1974), American historian and author
- Jared Fogle (born 1977), American former spokesman for Subway and registered sex offender
- Jared Followill (born 1986), American musician
- Jared Freid, American comedian and podcaster
- Jared French (1905–1988), American painter
- Jared Friedman (born 1984), American entrepreneur and investor
- Jared Gertner, American actor
- Jared Gilman (born 1998), American actor
- Jared Gilmore (born 2000), American actor
- Jared Gold (born 1972), American fashion designer
- Jared Gold (organist), American musician
- Jared Gomes (born 1968), American musician and activist
- Jared Ian Goldman (born 1979), American film and television producer
- Jared Lee Gosselin (born 1981), American record producer
- Jared J. Grantham (1936–2017), American physician, nephrologist, and author
- Jared Gutstadt (born 1977), Canadian-born American music executive
- Jared Hampton (born 1990), American musician
- Jared Harris (born 1961), British actor
- Jared Hartmann (born 1985), American musician
- Jared Hasselhoff (born 1971), American musician and actor
- Jared Hauser (born 1971), American musician and professor
- Jared Hecht (born 1987), American entrepreneur
- Jared Hedges (born 1980), American screenwriter, television producer, and video game producer
- Jared Hess (born 1979), American filmmaker
- Jared Hudgins (born 1988), American football player and coach
- Jared Isaacman (born 1983), American businessman
- Jared Israel (born 1944), American writer, activist, and conspiracy theorist
- Jared Jussim (born 1935), American lawyer, actor and former executive vice president at Sony Pictures
- Jared Keeso (born 1984), Canadian actor
- Jared Kusnitz (born 1988), American actor
- Jared Lane (born 1972), New Zealand artist and illustrator
- Jared Lee (born 1943), Canadian artist and cartoonist
- Jared Lehr, American jewelry fashion designer
- Jared Leto (born 1971), American actor and musician
- Jared Louche (born 1960), American musician
- Jared MacEachern (born 1980), American musician
- Jared Marston, Australian musician and DJ producer
- Jared Martin (1940–2017), American actor
- Jared McCloud (born 1980), American musician
- Jared Mezzocchi (born 1985), American theatre projection designer and director
- Jared Mitchell (writer) (born 1955), Canadian journalist and author
- Jared Morgenstern (born 1981), American designer and entrepreneur
- Jared Moshe, American film director, screenwriter, and producer
- Jared Murillo (born 1988), American dancer, singer, and actor
- Jared James Nichols (born 1989), American musician
- Jared Nissim (born 1973), American businessman
- Jared Overton, American musician
- Jared Padalecki (born 1982), American actor
- Jared Palomar, American musician
- Jared Pappas-Kelly (born 1974), American curator, author, and visual artist
- Jared Paul, American Talent manager and producer
- Jared Pelletier (born 1990), Canadian director
- Jared Poythress (born 1985), Japanese-born American music producer and DJ
- Jared Purton (1976–2009), Australian-born immunologist
- Jared Rigsby, American musician
- Jared Robinsen (born 1963), Australian actor
- Jared Rushton (born 1974), American musician and actor
- Jared Yates Sexton (born 1981), American author and political commentator
- Jared Shavelson, American musician
- Jared Slingerland (born 1984), Canadian musician
- Jared Sorensen, indie role-playing game designer
- Jared Southwick, (1976–2011), American musician
- Jared Spears (born 1936), American musician
- Jared Spool (born 1960), American Author, public speaker, and consultant
- Jared Paul Stern (born 1971), American journalist, photographer, and designer
- Jared Stern, American screenwriter
- Jared Swilley (born 1983), American musician
- Jared Taylor (born 1951), American white supremacist and author
- Jared Thomas (born 1976), Australian author
- Jared Tinklenberg, American psychiatrist and author
- Jared Sidney Torrance (1853–1921), American businessman and real estate developer
- Jared Turner (born 1978), New Zealand-born Australian actor
- Jared Tyler (born 1978), American musician
- Jared Van Snellenberg (born 1980), Canadian actor
- Jared Wade (born 1989), American musician
- Jared Warren, American musician
- Jared Warth (born 1986), American musician
- Jared Bell Waterbury (1799–1876), American minister and author
- Jared Yates, (American Idol) contestant

=== Government and politics ===
- Jared Bauman (fl. 2022), American politician
- Jared Benson (1821–1894), American politician
- Jared Bernstein (born 1955), American economist, author, and advisor at the Center on Budget and Policy Priorities
- Jared Brossett (born 1982), American politician
- Jared M. Brush (1814–1895), American politician, 28th Mayor of Pittsburgh PA
- Jared Cohen (born 1981), American businessman, author, and advisor at the Council on Foreign Relations
- Jared Genser (born 1972), international human rights lawyer, author, and advisor at the Raoul Wallenberg Centre for Human Rights
- Jared Golden (born 1982), American Marine veteran and politician
- Jared Comstock Gregory (1823–1892), American politician, 12th Mayor of Madison WI
- Jared Hegwood, American author and writer for the United States Naval Oceanographic Office
- Jared Henderson, American politician
- Jared Huffman (born 1964), American politician
- Jared Ingersol Chipman (1788–1832), Nova Scotian lawyer and politician
- Jared Ingersoll (1749–1822), American politician
- Jared Ingersoll Sr. (1722–1781) American stamp act agent
- Jared Irwin (1750–1818), American politician, 22nd Governor of Georgia
- Jared Irwin (Pennsylvania politician) (1768–1818), American politician and zoologist
- Jared Kaplan (born 1982) physicist, co-founder of Anthropic
- Jared Potter Kirtland (1793–1877), American politician
- Jared Kushner (born 1981), American businessman and senior advisor to President Donald Trump
- Jared Maddux (1911–1971), American politician
- Jared Mansfield (1759–1830), American mathematician, Professor at the United States Military Academy and Surveyor General of the Northwest Territory
- Jared Mead (born 1991), American politician
- Jared Moskowitz (born 1980), American politician
- Jared Novelly (born 1974/1975), American diplomat
- Jared Nunes (born 1982), American politician
- Jared Olsen (born 1987), American politician
- Jared O'Mara (born 1981), former British politician
- Jared Patterson, American politician
- Jared Paul Stratton, American politician
- Jared V. Peck (1816–1891), American politician
- Jared Perkins (1793–1854), American politician
- Jared Ploger, American politician
- Jared Polis (born 1975), American politician, 43rd Governor of Colorado
- Jared Y. Sanders Jr. (1892–1960), American lawyer and politician
- Jared Y. Sanders Sr. (1869–1944), American politician
- Jared Solomon (born 1978), American politician
- Jared Solomon (Maryland politician), American politician
- Jared Sparks (1789–1866), American historian and politician
- Jared Thompson Jr. (1836–1914), American lawyer and politician
- Jared C. Troop (1837–1876), Canadian lawyer and politician
- Jared Weinstein (born 1979), former government official and personal aide to the 43rd President of the United States
- Jared Whitaker (1818–1884), American newspaperman and politician
- Jared W. Williams (1796–1864), American lawyer and politician
- Jared Williams (Virginia politician) (1766–1831), American politician
- Jared Woodfill (born 1968), American lawyer and politician
- Jared Wright, American newspaper editor and former politician

=== Sports ===
- Jared Abbrederis (born 1990), American football player
- Jared Allen (born 1982), American football player
- Jared Allen (quarterback) (born 1981), American football coach and former player
- Jared Anderson (boxer) (born 1999), American boxer
- Jared Aulin (born 1982), Canadian ice hockey player
- Jared Barker (born 1975), Canadian rugby union player
- Jared Bartlett (born 2001), American football player
- Jared Bednar (born 1972), Canadian ice hockey coach and former player
- Jared Benko, American athletic director
- Jared Berggren (born 1990), American basketball player
- Jared Bird (born 1997), English footballer
- Jared Bidwell (born 1987), Australian rower
- Jared Boll (born 1986), American ice hockey player
- Jared Borgetti (born 1973), Mexican footballer
- Jarrad Branthwaite (born 2002), English footballer
- Jared Brennan (born 1984), Australian rules football player
- Jared Brown (born 1973), American football player
- Jared Brownridge (born 1994), American basketball player
- Jared Burton (born 1981), American baseball player
- Jared Butler (born 2000), American basketball player
- Jared Cannonier (born 1984), American mixed martial artist
- Jared Clauss (born 1981), American football player
- Jared Connaughton (born 1985), Canadian sprinter
- Jared Cook (born 1987), American football player
- Jared Coreau (born 1991), Canadian ice hockey player
- Jared Cowen (born 1991), Canadian ice hockey player
- Jared Crick (born 1989), American football player
- Jared Crouch (born 1978), Australian rules football player
- Jared Cunningham (born 1991), American basketball player
- Jared Curtis (footballer) (born 1979), Samoan footballer
- Jared Deacon (born 1975), British sprinter
- Jared DeMichiel (born 1985), American ice hockey coach and former player
- Jared DeVries (born 1976), American football player
- Jared Dillinger (born 1984), Filipino-American basketball player
- Jared Donaldson (born 1996), American tennis player
- Jared Downing (born 1989), American mixed martial artist
- Jared Dudley (born 1985), American basketball player
- Jared Elliott, American football coach
- Jared Embick (born 1978), American soccer coach and former player
- Jared Fernández (born 1972), American baseball player
- Jared Frayer (born 1978), American wrestler
- Jared Gaither (born 1986), American football player
- Jared Garcia (born 1982) American BMX rider
- Jared Goff (born 1994), American football player
- Jared Goldberg (born 1991), American alpine skier
- Jared Gomes (ice hockey) (born 1988), Canadian ice hockey player
- Jared Gordon (born 1988), American mixed martial artist
- Jared Grasso (born 1980), American basketball coach and former player
- Jared Graves (born 1982), Australian cyclist
- Jared Green (born 1989), American football player
- Jared Hamman (born 1982), American martial artist
- Jared Harper (born 1997), American basketball player
- Jared Harrison-Hunte (born 2000), American football player
- Jared Hassin (born 1989), American football player
- Jared Heine (born 1984), Marshallese swimmer
- Jared Hess (fighter) (born 1983), American mixed martial artist
- Jared Hodgkiss (born 1986), English footballer
- Jared Homan (born 1983), American basketball player
- Jared Hoying (born 1989), American baseball player
- Jared Hughes (born 1985), American baseball player
- Jared Ivey (born 2001), American football player
- Jared Jarvis (born 1994), Antigua and Barbuda sprinter
- Jared Jeffrey (born 1990), American soccer player
- Jared Jeffries (born 1981), American basketball player
- Jared Jenkins (born 1989), American football player
- Jared Jordan (born 1984), American basketball player
- Jarred Kelenic (born 1999), American baseball player
- Jared Kelley (born 2001), American baseball player
- Jared Khasa (born 1997), French football player
- Jared Kirby, American fencing instructor and martial artist
- Jared Koenig (born 1994), American baseball player
- Jared Koster (born 1991), Canadian football player
- Jared Lakind (born 1992), American baseball player
- Jared Landers (born 1982), American racing driver
- Jared Lewis (born 1982), Saint Vincent and the Grenadines sprinter
- Jared London (born 1995), Trinidadian footballer
- Jared Lorenzen (1981-2019), American football player
- Jared Lum (born 1992), Australian soccer player
- Jared Mayden (born 1998), American football player
- Jared McCain (born 2004), American basketball player
- Jared McCann (born 1996), Canadian ice hockey player
- Jared McGee, American football player
- Jared McGriff-Culver (born 1989), American football player
- Jared Mees (born 1986), American motorcycle racer
- Jared Mitchell (baseball) (born 1988), American baseball player
- Jared Mills (born 1976), New Zealand rugby league player
- Jared Montz (born 1982), American soccer player
- Jared Moon (born 1971), American baseball coach and former player
- Jared Mortensen (born 1988), Canadian baseball player
- Jared Newberry (born 1981), American football player
- Jared Newson (born 1984), American basketball player
- Jared Nickens (born 1994), American basketball player
- Jared Nightingale (born 1982), American ice hockey player
- Jared Norman (born 1974), English cricketer
- Jared Norris (born 1993), American football player
- Jared Odenbeck (born 1995), American soccer player
- Jared Odrick (born 1987), American football player
- Jared Oliva (born 1995), American baseball player
- Jared Page (born 1993), New Zealand rugby union player
- Jared Palmer (born 1971), American tennis player
- Jared Panchia (born 1993), New Zealand field hockey player
- Jared Payne (born 1985), New Zealand-born Irish rugby union player
- Jared Peniston (born 1982), Bermudian footballer
- Jared Penning (born 2000), American football player
- Jared Perry (born 1988), American football player
- Jared Petrenko (born 1989), Australian rules football player
- Jarred Phillips (born 1995), Canadian soccer player
- Jared Pinkney (born 1997), American football player
- Jared Poché (born 1994), American baseball player
- Jared Polec (born 1992), Australian rules football player
- Jared Poulton (born 1977), Australian rules football player
- Jared Rando (born 1981), Australian mountain biker
- Jared Reiner (born 1982), American basketball player
- Jared Retkofsky (born 1983), American football player
- Jared Rhoden (born 1999), American basketball player
- Jared Rivers (born 1984), Australian rules football player
- Jared Rollins (born 1977), American mixed martial artist
- Jared Rosholt (born 1986), American mixed martial artist
- Jared Ross (born 1982), American ice hockey player
- Jared Rosser (born 1997), Welsh rugby union player
- Jared Sandberg (born 1978), American baseball coach and former player
- Jared Saunders (born 1990), South African rugby union player
- Jared Savage (born 1997), American basketball player
- Jared Schuurmans (born 1987), American discus thrower
- Jared "Skip" Schumaker (born 1980), American baseball player
- Jared Serna (born 2002), Mexican baseball player
- Jarred Shaw (born 1990), American basketball player
- Jared Shuster (born 1998), American baseball player
- Jared Simpson (born 1996), English rugby league player
- Jared Sims (born 1993), English footballer
- Jared Smith (born 1990), American football player
- Jared Solomon (baseball) (born 1997), American baseball player
- Jared Southard (born 2000), American baseball player
- Jared Spurgeon (born 1989), Canadian ice hockey player
- Jared Staal (born 1990), Canadian ice hockey player
- Jared Stroud (born 1996), American soccer player
- Jared Sullinger (born 1992), American basketball player
- Jared Tallent (born 1984), Australian race walker
- Jared Taylor (rugby league) (born 1981), French rugby league player
- Jared Tebo (born 1987), American radio-controlled car racer
- Jared Terrell (born 1995), American basketball player
- Jared Theodorakos (born 1981), American baseball player
- Jared Timmer (born 1997), American soccer player
- Jared du Toit (born 1995), Canadian golfer
- Jared Tomich (born 1974), American football player
- Jarred Vanderbilt (born 1999), American basketball player
- Jared Veldheer (born 1987), American football player
- Jared Verse (born 2000), American football player
- Jared Waerea-Hargreaves (born 1989), New Zealand rugby league player
- Jared Walsh (born 1993), American baseball player
- Jared Ward (born 1988), American long-distance runner
- Jared Warner (born 1996), English cricketer
- Jared Watts (born 1992), American soccer player
- Jared Wayne (born 2000), Canadian American football player
- Jered Weaver (born 1982), American baseball player
- Jared Wells (born 1981), American baseball player
- Jared Wiley (born 2000), American football player
- Jared Wilson (American football) (born 2003), American football player
- Jared Wilson (footballer) (born 1989), English footballer
- Jared Wolfe (born 1988), American golfer
- Jared Young (born 1995), Canadian baseball player
- Jared Zabransky (born 1983), American football player
- Jared Zezel (born 1991), American curler

=== Other people ===
- Jared Carter (Latter Day Saints) (1801–1849), early American leader in the Latter Day Saint movement
- Jared Crane, son of American businessman Jim Crane
- Jared Kleinstein, American baseball fan who mimicked baseball player Tim Tebow for kneeling during the U.S. national anthem
- Jared Lee Loughner (born 1988), American criminal who was arrested for the 2011 Tucson shooting
- Jared C. Monti (1975–2006), American soldier who was killed in action during the War in Afghanistan
- Jared Pratt (1769–1839), American and father of the Mormon pioneer brothers
- Jared Remy (born 1978), American criminal who was involved in the assault and murder of Jennifer Martel
- Jared Robinet, American police officer who was involved in the shooting of Stephon Clark

== Fictional characters ==
- Jared, character from the television show Kids Incorporated (portrayed by Jared Delgin)
- Jared Afeaki, character from television show Shortland Street (portrayed by Beulah Koale)
- Jared Banks, character from television show One Life to Live (portrayed by John Brotherton)
- Jared Casey, character from television show Passions (portrayed by James Stevenson)
- Jared Dunn, character from television show Silicon Valley (portrayed by Zach Woods)
- Jared Garrity, character from television show The Twilight Zone (portrayed by John Dehner)
- Jared Evan Grace, character from the movie The Spiderwick Chronicles (portrayed by Freddie Highmore)
- Jared Hall, character from the television show One Life to Live (portrayed by Herve Clermont)
- Jared Haynes, character from the television show Emmerdale (portrayed by Philip Hill-Pearson)
- Jared Kincaid, character from Jim Butcher's novel series The Dresden Files
- Jared Kleinman, character from the Broadway musical Dear Evan Hansen (portrayed by Alex Wyse, Will Roland, Jared Goldsmith, and Jack Loxton)
- Jared Levine, character from the television show All Saints (portrayed by Ben Tari)
- Jared "Munter" Mason, character from the television show Outrageous Fortune (portrayed by Tammy Davis)
- Jared Morillo, character from the DC comic series Rogues
- Jared Morillo (Arrowverse), character from the television show The Flash (portrayed by Stephen Huszar)
- Jared Nomak, character from the movie Blade 2 (portrayed by Luke Goss)
- Jared (Jarob) Parker, character from The Detour (portrayed by Liam Carroll)
- Jared Vasquez, character from Manifest (portrayed by J. R. Ramirez)
- Jared Bakravan, character from James Clavell's novel Whirlwind
- Jared Vance (portrayed by Akinsola Arimbo), son of character Leon Vance from the television show NCIS

== See also ==
- Jarad, given name
- Yared (505–571), an Ethiopian monk
