= Nissim =

Nissim or Nisim may refer to:

== People ==
=== Given name ===
- Nissim (rapper) (born 1986), American Jewish rapper
- Nissim of Gerona (1320–1376), talmudist and authority on Jewish law
- Nisim Aloni (1926–1998), Israeli playwright and translator
- Nissim Behar (1848–1931), Jewish Palestinian educator
- Nissim Benvenisty, Israeli professor of Genetics
- Nissim ben Jacob (990–1062), also known as Rav Nissim Gaon, a rabbi
- Nissim Dahan (born 1954), Israeli politician who served as Minister of Health
- Nissim de Camondo (1892–1917), French banker
- Nissim Eliad (1919–2014), Israeli politician
- Nissim Ezekiel (1924–2004), Indian Jewish poet, playwright, editor, and art critic
- Nissim Karelitz (1926-2019), rabbi
- Nissim Mossek (born 1948), Israeli documentary director, writer, and producer
- Nissim Nassim Adis (1857—1927), Jewish businessman and stockbroker in Singapore
- Nissim Otmazgin, Israeli scholar, specializing in the field of Asian studies
- Nissim Ze'ev (born 1951), Israeli politician
- Nissim Zvili (born 1942), Israeli politician
- Vieri Nissim, businessman, business banker, and film producer, grandson of Federico Cammeo, President of Circolo del Polo Club de Milan, Italo-Israeli (Florence, 1962 -).

=== Surname ===
- Afik Nissim (born 1981), Israeli point guard in basketball
- Chaïm Nissim (1949–2017), Green politician who launched the 1982 rocket attack against the Superphénix nuclear plant
- Eliahu Nissim (1933-2020), Israeli Professor in Aeronautical Engineering; President of the Open University of Israel
- Gabriele Nissim (born 1950), Italian journalist, historian, and essayist
- Giorgio Nissim (1908–1976), Italian civilian anti-fascist hero
- Jacob ben Nissim ibn Shahin, Jewish philosopher who lived in Tunisia in the 10th century
- Jared Nissim, American entrepreneur
- Judah ben Nissim al-Malkah, Moroccan, Jewish writer and philosopher
- Kobbi Nissim (born 1965), American computer scientist at Georgetown University
- Mary Rosselli Nissim (1864-1937), Italian artist and composer
- Moshe Nissim (born 1935), Israeli politician and Deputy Prime Minister
- Offer Nissim, Israeli musician
- Oren Nissim (born 1976), Israeli footballer
- Yitzhak Nissim (1896–1981), Sephardic chief rabbi of Israel
- Solomon Nissim Algazi (1610–1683), rabbi in the 17th century

== Museums ==
- Musée Nissim de Camondo, museum

== Synagogues ==
- Bet Nissim Synagogue, synagogue built in the 1840s in Istanbul, Turkey
