= Jarod =

Jarod is an alternative form of Jared and other variants like Jarred, Jarrad, Jarad, Jarid, Jarrid, Jareth, Jay, Jered, Jerad, Jerrad, Jarrod, Jerid, Jerrid, Jerrod, Jerred, and Jerod.

Jarod may refer to:

== Places ==
- Jarod, Gujarat, a village in Vaghodia Taluka of Vadodara district in Gujarat state of India

== Persons ==
- Jarod Fox, American politician
- Jarod Green (born 1981), Australian film director, screenwriter
- Jarod Miller, host for television series Animal Exploration with Jarod Miller
- Jarod Palmer (born 1986), American ice hockey player
- Jarod Schilke (born 2000), German politician

== Fictional characters ==
- Jarod The Pretender or just Jarod on TV series The Pretender

== See also ==
- Jarad
- Jared
- Jarrod
