= Jared (disambiguation) =

Jared is a first name of biblical derivation.

Jared may also refer to:

== Religion ==
- Jared (Biblical figure), a biblical fifth-generation descendant of Adam and Eve
- Jared (founder of Jaredites), a primary ancestor of the Jaredites in the Book of Mormon

== Others ==
- Jared, Washington, a community in the United States
- Jared, a brand operated by Sterling Jewelers
- "Jared", a song by Kanye West from his unreleased album Cuck

== See also ==
- Jarod (disambiguation)
- Jarrett (disambiguation)
