= Jared Curtis =

Jared Curtis may refer to:

- Jared Curtis (professor) (born 1936), professor
- Jared Curtis (footballer) (born 1979), Samoan footballer
- Jared Curtis (American football), American football player
