= Frank Sibley =

Frank Sibley may refer to:

- Francis Sibley (1930–2019), American musician and scholar of literary criticism
- Frank Sibley (footballer) (1947–2024), English football player and manager for Queen's Park Rangers
- Frank Sibley (philosopher) (1923–1996), British professor of philosophy at Lancaster University
