= Schilke =

German surname

Schilke is a surname. It may refer to:

- Alan Schilke (born 1965), American engineer and roller coaster designer
- Clara Schilke (born 1998), American former professional soccer player
- Jarod Schilke (born 2000), German politician
- Renold Schilke (1910-1982), American professional orchestral trumpet player, instrument designer and manufacturer
