= Jared Mitchell =

Jared Mitchell may refer to:

- Jared Mitchell (baseball) (born 1988), former LSU baseball player drafted by the Chicago White Sox
- Jared Mitchell (writer) (born 1955), Canadian author and newspaper writer
