= Speculative instrument =

A Speculative instrument is an instrument which has been designed to aid those undertaking a speculative or investigative task. The English philosopher and literary critic, I. A. Richards, is the principal person responsible for developing the concept. He published a collection of essays entitled Speculative Instruments in 1955.

== Origins of the term ==
The term appears in William Shakespeare's play Othello. However, the first two printed versions of the play exhibit differences in the relevant passage. Thus textual criticism can lead to a variety of interpretations:

Variorum	Quarto (1622)	Folio (1623)
Act 1, Scene 3	". . . . no, when light-winged toyes, And feather'd Cupid foyles with wanton dulnesse, My speculatiue and actiue instruments, That my disports, corrupt and taint my businesse, Let huswiues make a skellett of my Helme, And all indigne and base aduersities, Make head against my reputation."	"...No, when light wing'd Toyes Of feather'd Cupid, seele with wanton dulnesse My speculatiue, and offic'd Instrument: That my Disports corrupt, and taint my businesse: Let House-wiues make a Skillet of my Helme, And all indigne, and base aduersities, Make head against my Estimation."
Interpretation	Edmond Malone:Speculative instruments are the eyes, and active instruments are the hands and feet, "seel" means to "close the eyelids of a hawk by running a thread through them"	Jared Curtis:Speculative instruments refers to Othello's rational powers, or speculative wit, by which the will is in turn offic'd

However, as the term "theory" in itself derives from a metaphorical use of a Greek word more generally used as regards viewing and spectating, these differences can both be seen as lying within that metaphoric range. As Francis Sibley remarks: "the concept of speculative instruments is itself a speculative instrument and hence fluid, not static."
