= Jarrod =

Jarrod is a variant of the name Jared. Jarrod may refer to:

- Jarrod Alexander, American drummer
- Jarrod Alonge (born 1993), American comedian, musician and YouTuber
- Jarrod Atkinson, Australian rules footballer
- Jarrod Bannister (1984-2018), Australian javelin thrower
- Jarrod Baxter (born 1979), former fullback in the NFL
- Jarrod Bleijie (born 1982), Australian politician and member of the Queensland Parliament
- Jarrod Bowen (born 1996), English professional footballer
- Jarrod Brooks, American politician
- Jarrod Bunch (born 1968), former American football running back
- Jarrod Carland, Australian actor and singer
- Jarrod Cooper (born 1978), American football safety
- Jarrod Croker (born 1990), Australian rugby league player
- Jarrod Cunningham (1968–2007), New Zealand rugby union fullback
- Jarrod Dyson (born 1984), major league baseball outfielder
- Jarrod Emick (born 1969), American musical theatre actor
- Jarrod Englefield (born 1979), New Zealand cricketer
- Jarrod Evans (born 1996), Welsh international rugby player
- Jarrod Fletcher (born 1983), Australian amateur boxer
- Jarrod Harbrow (born 1988), professional Australian rules footballer
- Jarrod Jablonski, pioneering technical diver and record setting cave diver
- Jarrod Jones (born 1990), American-Hungarian basketball player in the Israeli Basketball Premier League
- Jarrod Kayler-Thomson (born 1985), Australian rules footballer
- Jarrod Kenny (born 1985), New Zealand professional basketball player
- Jarrod King, male badminton competitor for New Zealand
- Jarrod Lyle (1981-2018), Australian professional golfer
- Jarrod Marrs (born 1975), retired US male breaststroke swimmer
- Jarrod Martin, Republican member of the Ohio House of Representatives
- Jarrod McCracken (born 1970), New Zealand former rugby league footballer
- Jarrod Molloy (born 1976), Australian rules footballer
- Jarrod Moseley (born 1972), Australian professional golfer
- Jarrod Mullen (born 1987), Australian professional rugby league player
- Jarrod O'Doherty, rugby league footballer of the 1990s and 2000s
- Jarrod Patterson (born 1973), retired Major League Baseball third baseman
- Jarrod Pughsley (born 1990), American football player
- Jarrod Saffy (born 1984), Australian professional rugby union player
- Jarrod Saltalamacchia (born 1985), Major League Baseball catcher
- Jarrod Sammis, (born 1989 or 1990), American politician
- Jarrod Sammut (born 1987), Australian rugby league player
- Jarrod Shoemaker (born 1982), professional triathlete based in Maynard, Massachusetts
- Jarrod Silvester, Australian Rules Football player for AFL club Richmond
- Jarrod Skalde (born 1971), Canadian ice hockey centre
- Jarrod Smith (born 1984), New Zealand professional footballer
- Jarrod Wallace (born 1991), Australian Rugby League player
- Jarrod Washburn (born 1974), former Major League Baseball pitcher

== See also ==
- Jared
- Jarod (disambiguation)
