= Boston Online Film Critics Association =

Organization of film critics

- Abbreviation: BOFCA
- Formation: May 2012; 14 years ago
- Type: Film criticism
- Headquarters: Boston, Massachusetts
- Location: United States
- Website: bofca.com

The Boston Online Film Critics Association (BOFCA) is an organization of film critics who primarily publish their work online. Based in Boston, Massachusetts, it was founded in May 2012 to foster a community of web-based film critics, provide professional support, and actively participate in the local Boston film scene through sponsorships, festival support, and educational outreach.

== History ==
BOFCA was established in May 2012 with the goal of creating a supportive network for online film critics and amplifying their voices within the broader film community. The association distinguishes itself from traditional print-based critics groups, such as the older Boston Society of Film Critics (founded in 1981), by focusing exclusively on web-based criticism.

The group engages with the Boston film community by sponsoring screenings, supporting local festivals, and promoting cinephilia in the area.

== Awards ==
Since its founding, BOFCA has annually presented the Boston Online Film Critics Association Awards, honoring the best films and performances of the year. The awards typically include categories such as Best Picture, Best Director, Best Actor, Best Actress, and others. Members vote individually, and the association also releases a ranked Top Ten Films list.

=== Selected past winners ===
Year	Best Picture	Best Director	Ref.
2025	One Battle After Another	Paul Thomas Anderson (One Battle After Another)	
2024	The Brutalist	Brady Corbet (The Brutalist)	
2023	Killers of the Flower Moon	Christopher Nolan (Oppenheimer)	
2022	The Banshees of Inisherin	Daniel Kwan and Daniel Scheinert (Everything Everywhere All at Once)	
2021	The Power of the Dog	Jane Campion (The Power of the Dog)	
2020	Nomadland	Chloé Zhao (Nomadland)	
2019	Parasite	Bong Joon Ho (Parasite)	
2018	You Were Never Really Here	Lynne Ramsay (You Were Never Really Here)	
2017	Get Out	Paul Thomas Anderson (Phantom Thread)	
2016	Moonlight	Damien Chazelle (La La Land)	
2015	Mad Max: Fury Road	George Miller (Mad Max: Fury Road)	
2014	Snowpiercer	Alejandro González Iñárritu (Birdman)	
2013	12 Years a Slave	Steve McQueen (12 Years a Slave)	
2012	Zero Dark Thirty	Kathryn Bigelow (Zero Dark Thirty)	

Full lists of winners and individual member ballots for past years are available on the official website.

== Membership ==
BOFCA consists of professional online film critics based in or connected to the Boston area. Notable members include:

- Joyce Kulhawik (arts critic for WBZ-TV, former president of the Boston Theater Critics Association)
- Daniel M. Kimmel (film lecturer and author)
- Kilian Melloy (EDGE Media Network)
- Evan Crean (founding member, co-chair, and treasurer)
- Oscar Goff (Boston Hassle)
- Jared Bowen (WGBH-TV)
- Tim Estiloz (film reviewer and interviewer)

A complete and current list of members is maintained on the association's website.

== See also ==
- Boston Society of Film Critics
- Online Film Critics Society
- List of film awards
