= Jarad =

Jarad is a given name. Notable people with the name include:

- Jarad Higgins or Juice Wrld (1998–2019), American rapper and singer
- Jarad Klein (born 1981), American politician
- Jarad van Schaik (born 1988), American soccer player

== See also ==
- Jared, given name
- Jarod (disambiguation)#Persons
