= Calais Campbell =

American football player (born 1986)

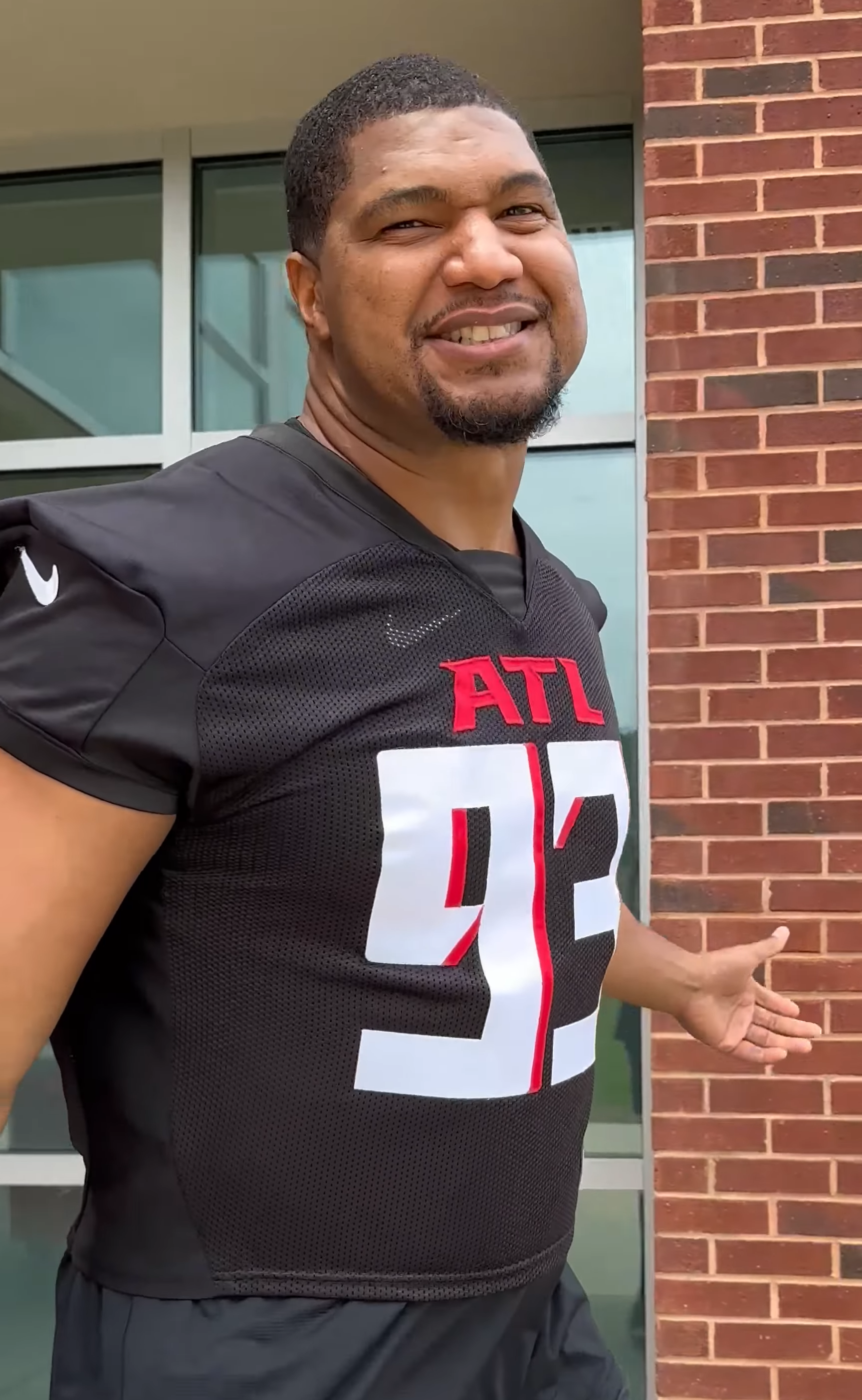
- Campbell with the Atlanta Falcons in 2023

No. 93 – Baltimore Ravens
- Position: Defensive end
- Roster status: Active

Personal information
- Born: September 1, 1986 (age 40); Denver, Colorado, U.S.
- Listed height: 6 ft 8 in (2.03 m)
- Listed weight: 307 lb (139 kg)

Career information
- High school: South (Denver)
- College: Miami (FL) (2004–2007)
- NFL draft: 2008: 2nd round, 50th overall pick

Career history
- Arizona Cardinals (2008–2016); Jacksonville Jaguars (2017–2019); Baltimore Ravens (2020–2022); Atlanta Falcons (2023); Miami Dolphins (2024); Arizona Cardinals (2025); Baltimore Ravens (2026–present)

Awards and highlights
- First-team All-Pro (2017); 3× Second-team All-Pro (2014, 2016, 2017); 6× Pro Bowl (2014, 2015, 2017–2020); NFL 2010s All-Decade Team; Walter Payton NFL Man of the Year (2019); First-team All-ACC (2006); NFL records: Most games played at defensive end: 288

Career NFL statistics as of Week 11, 2026
- Tackles: 977
- Sacks: 118.0
- Pass deflections: 66
- Forced fumbles: 18
- Fumble recoveries: 13
- Interceptions: 3
- Defensive touchdowns: 3
- Stats at Pro Football Reference

Calais Malik Campbell (/kɑːˈleɪɪs/ kah-LAY-iss; born September 1, 1986) is an American professional football defensive end for the Baltimore Ravens of the National Football League (NFL). He played college football for the Miami Hurricanes and was selected by the Cardinals in the second round of the 2008 NFL draft.

== Early life ==
Campbell played his high school football at South High School in Denver, Colorado. Widely regarded as one of the nation's top defensive end prospects, he was ranked as the tenth-best strongside defensive end by Rivals.com and the seventh-best defensive end by Scout.com. He amassed a state-record total of 57 sacks in his career at South High School.

In addition to football, Campbell also starred on the school's basketball team; averaging 22.7 points (fourth best in Colorado), 16.0 rebounds per game (led the state) and 3.3 blocks per game, he was an All-State basketball selection as a junior. Campbell also competed in track and field at South, qualifying for the state meet in the discus and shot put in 2003. His track and field personal bests: 21 feet (6.4 m) in the long jump, 48 feet (15 m) in the shot put, 135 feet (41 m) in the discus and 44 feet 2 inches (13.46 m) in the triple jump.

Campbell chose Miami over Colorado State, Nebraska, Louisiana State, Michigan, Oklahoma, and San Diego State.

== College career ==
After redshirting his first season in 2004, Campbell became a starter at Miami in the 2005 season. In 11 games, he recorded 24 total tackles, 2.5 sacks, and three passes defensed. In the 2006 season, he had 55 total tackles, 10.5 sacks, four passes defensed, and three forced fumbles. He recorded at least three sacks in a single game on three occasions in the 2006 season. In his final season with the Hurricanes in 2007, he had 50 total tackles, 6.5 sacks, three passes defensed, and one interception, which came against Marshall in the season opener.

== Professional career ==
External videos
- Calais Campbell's NFL Combine Workout

Pre-draft measurables
Height	Weight	Arm length	Hand span	40-yard dash	10-yard split	20-yard split	20-yard shuttle	Three-cone drill	Vertical jump	Broad jump	Bench press
6 ft 7 3/4 in (2.03 m)	290 lb (132 kg)	35 3/4 in (0.91 m)	9 1/2 in (0.24 m)	5.00 s	1.72 s	2.88 s	4.63 s	7.19 s	34.5 in (0.88 m)	9 ft 3 in (2.82 m)	16 reps
All values from NFL Combine and Pro Day

=== Arizona Cardinals (first stint) ===
==== 2008 ====
The Arizona Cardinals selected Campbell in the second round (50th overall) of the 2008 NFL draft. Campbell was the sixth defensive end drafted in 2008. The Cardinals had no immediate need for a starting-caliber defensive end, but chose to make a value pick and draft Campbell after he unexpectedly fell out of the first round and was considered the top player available at the time of their selection.

On July 24, 2008, the Cardinals signed Campbell to a four-year, $3.40 million contract with $1.68 million guaranteed and a signing bonus of $484,500.

Campbell entered training camp slated as a backup defensive end and competed against Bryan Robinson and fellow rookie Kenny Iwebema for a spot in the rotation. Head coach Ken Whisenhunt officially named Campbell a backup defensive end to start the regular season, behind veterans Darnell Dockett and Antonio Smith.

Campbell made his professional regular season debut in the Cardinals' season-opener at the San Francisco 49ers and assisted on a tackle in their 23–13 victory. The following week, Campbell collected a season-high four solo tackles in the Cardinals' 31–10 victory against the Miami Dolphins in Week 2. During Week 16, Campbell tied his season-high of four solo tackles during a 47–7 loss at the New England Patriots.

Campbell completed his rookie season with 28 combined tackles (23 solo), a pass defended, a forced fumble, and a fumble recovery in 16 games and zero starts.

The Cardinals finished atop the NFC West with a 9–7 record and qualified for a playoff berth in 2008. On January 3, 2009, Campbell appeared in his first NFL playoff game and made two combined tackles during a 30–24 victory against the Atlanta Falcons in the National Football Conference (NFC) Wild Card Round. The Cardinals reached Super Bowl XLIII after defeating the Carolina Panthers 33–13 in the NFC Divisional Round and defeating the Philadelphia Eagles 32–25 in the NFC Championship. On February 1, 2009, Campbell appeared in Super Bowl XLIII and recorded two combined tackles as the Cardinals lost 27–23 in a closely contested match that was decided by with 0:35 remaining in the game. Campbell finished the playoffs with eight combined tackles (seven solo) and a pass deflection.

==== 2009 ====
On February 9, 2009, head coach Ken Whisenhunt fired defensive coordinator Clancy Pendergast due to the defense's inability to hold onto a 23–20 lead in the fourth quarter of Super Bowl XLIII. Campbell entered training camp slated as a starting defensive end after Antonio Smith departed for the Houston Texans during free agency. Defensive coordinator Billy Davis opted to switch from a base 4–3 defense to a base 3–4 defense. Head coach Ken Whisenhunt named Campbell the starting left defensive end, opposite Darnell Dockett and alongside nose tackle Bryan Robinson, to begin the regular season.

Campbell made his first career start in the Cardinals' season-opener against the 49ers and recorded a season-high six solo tackles and deflected a pass in their 20–16 loss. The following week, Campbell made a tackle, broke up a pass, and was credited with half a sack during a 31–17 victory at the Jacksonville Jaguars in Week 2. His first career sack was with teammate Adrian Wilson, as the two brought down quarterback David Garrard in the fourth quarter. On October 18, 2009, Campbell recorded three combined tackles and a season-high 1.5 sacks during a 27–3 win at the Seattle Seahawks in Week 6. He sacked quarterback Matt Hasselbeck for a seven-yard loss in the third quarter to mark the first solo sack of his career. In Week 8, he collected a season-high seven combined tackles (six solo) in the Cardinals' 34–21 loss to the Panthers. Campbell finished the 2009 season with a total of 45 combined tackles (37 solo), seven sacks, five passes defensed, and a forced fumble in 16 games and 15 starts.

The Cardinals finished atop the NFC West with a 10–6 record and defeated the Green Bay Packers in overtime 51–45 during the NFC Wild Card Round. On January 16, 2010, Campbell started his first career playoff game and made three solo tackles in a 45–14 loss at the New Orleans Saints in the NFC Divisional Round.

==== 2010 ====
Head coach Ken Whisenhunt chose to retain Campbell and Darnell Dockett as the starting defensive ends to begin the regular season, along with nose tackle Bryan Robinson.

Campbell was sidelined during the Cardinals' Week 12 loss to the 49ers after injuring his ankle the previous week. On November 29, 2010, Campbell recorded a season-high 11 combined tackles (nine solo) and sacked quarterback Jimmy Clausen during a 19–12 loss at the Panthers in Week 15. The following week, he made two solo tackles and a sack in the Cardinals' 27–26 win against the Dallas Cowboys in Week 16. It marked his second consecutive game with a sack and his sixth sack of the season. Campbell finished the season with 60 combined tackles (46 solo), six sacks, and two pass deflections, and a fumble recovery in 15 games and 15 starts.

==== 2011 ====
On January 6, 2011, head coach Ken Whisenhunt announced the firing of defensive coordinator Billy Davis after the Cardinals finished with a 5–11 record and allowed the third most points in the league in 2010. Head coach Ken Whisenhunt hired Pittsburgh Steelers' secondary coach, Ray Horton, as the Cardinals new defensive coordinator. Horton employed a base 3-4 defense that utilized multiple fronts. Horton retained Campbell and Darnell Dockett as the starting defensive ends to start the season, along with nose tackle Dan Williams.

On September 25, 2011, Campbell made a season-high ten combined tackles (five solo) and was credited with a season-high 2.5 sacks on quarterback Tarvaris Jackson during a 13–10 loss at the Seahawks in Week 3. In Week 9, he collected six solo tackles and made two sacks on quarterback Sam Bradford in the Cardinals' 19–13 win against the St. Louis Rams. The following week, he made two solo tackles, two pass deflections, and made his first career interception off a pass by quarterback Michael Vick in the third quarter of a 21–17 victory at the Eagles in Week 10. He finished the season with a career-high 72 combined tackles (53 solo), ten pass deflections, eight sacks, two forced fumbles, and an interception in 16 games and 16 starts.

He also appeared on special teams and blocked three field goals during the season. Campbell predominantly lined up in the five-technique in his first season under Ray Horton.

==== 2012 ====
On March 2, 2012, the Cardinals placed their non-exclusive franchise tag to Campbell for the 2012 season. On May 10, 2012, the Cardinals signed Campbell to a five-year, $55 million contract with $31 million guaranteed and a signing bonus of $15 million.

Head coach Ken Whisenhunt retained Campbell, Darnell Dockett, and nose tackle Dan Williams as the starting defensive linemen to begin the regular season. On September 16, 2012, Campbell collected a season-high ten combined tackles (seven solo) and recorded two sacks on quarterback Tom Brady in a 20–18 win at the Patriots in Week 2. Campbell was inactive for three games (Weeks 11–13) due to an injury to his right calf. In Week 16, he collected eight combined tackles, deflected a pass, and recorded a sack during a 28–13 loss to the Chicago Bears. The following week, Campbell made two solo tackles and a sack in the Cardinals' 27–13 loss at the 49ers in Week 17. Campbell completed the 2012 season with 65 combined tackles (50 solo), 6.5 sacks, and six pass deflections in 13 games and 12 starts.

==== 2013 ====
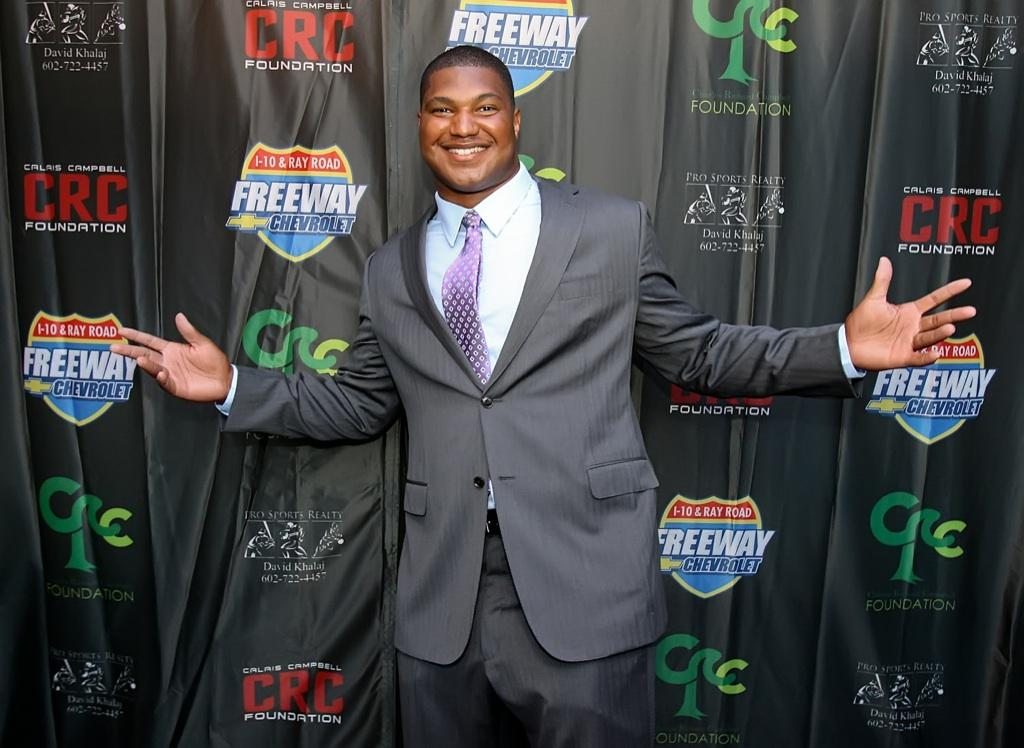
Campbell in 2013

On January 8, 2013, the Cardinals fired general manager Rod Graves and head coach Ken Whisenhunt after the team finished last in their division with a 5–11 record in 2012. On January 18, 2013, it was reported that defensive coordinator Ray Horton demanded his release after Bruce Arians was hired as the new head coach instead of Horton. Head coach Bruce Arians officially named Campbell and Darnell Dockett the starting defensive ends to begin the 2013 season.

On October 6, 2013, Campbell recorded four solo tackles, two sacks, and earned his first career safety during a 22–6 victory against the Panthers in Week 4. He sacked quarterback Cam Newton for a five-yard loss in the end zone to record a safety in the third quarter. In Week 7, he collected a season-high eight combined tackles in a 34–22 loss to the Seahawks. On December 22, 2013, Campbell recorded four combined tackles and sacked quarterback Russell Wilson twice to tie his season-high during a 17–10 win at the Seattle Seahawks in Week 16. Campbell started all 16 games in 2013 and recorded 58 combined tackles (45 solo), nine sacks, six passes defended, two fumble recoveries, a forced fumble, and a safety. The Cardinals' new defensive coordinator, Todd Bowles, retained the base 3-4 defense, but also used multiple fronts with an emphasis on blitzing. Campbell was continually used as a defensive end and also lined up at defensive tackle in the three-technique for 8.4% of his defensive snaps.

==== 2014 ====
Defensive coordinator Todd Bowles retained Campbell as the starting left defensive end to start the regular season, alongside nose tackle Dan Williams and right defensive end Frostee Rucker.

On September 16, 2014, Campbell collected a season-high ten solo tackles and a sack during a 25–14 win at the New York Giants. In Week 5, Campbell recorded two solo tackles, deflected a pass, and made the second interception of his career in the Cardinals' 41–20 loss at the Denver Broncos. His interception came off a pass attempt by quarterback Peyton Manning and was a screen pass intended for running back Montee Ball in the second quarter. Campbell exited in the third quarter due to a leg injury he sustained on a chop block by tight end Julius Thomas. Head coach Bruce Arians was asked about the chop block and stated, "the dirtiest play I have seen in 37 years of coaching football!" Campbell was diagnosed with a sprained MCL and was sidelined for the next two games (Weeks 6–7). On November 23, 2014, Campbell made six combined tackles and had a career-high three sacks on quarterback Russell Wilson during the Cardinals' 19–3 loss at the Seahawks in Week 12. On December 24, 2014, it was announced that Campbell was voted to the Pro Bowl to mark the first Pro Bowl selection of his career.

Campbell finished the season with 58 combined tackles (48 solo), seven sacks, three passes defended, an interception, and a forced fumble in 14 games and 14 starts.

The Cardinals finished second in the NFC West with an 11–5 record and earned a Wild Card berth to mark their first postseason appearance since 2009. On January 3, 2015, Campbell made four combined tackles in the Cardinals 27–16 loss in the Wild Card Round at the Panthers. He was ranked 99th by his fellow players on the NFL Top 100 Players of 2015.

==== 2015 ====
Head coach Bruce Arians promoted Cardinals' linebackers coach James Bettcher to defensive coordinator after Todd Bowles accepted a job as the head coach for the New York Jets. Bettcher chose to retain Campbell and Frostee Rucker as the starting defensive ends with Josh Mauro and Rodney Gunter sharing the role at nose tackle.

In Week 4, Campbell collected a career-high 11 combined tackles (ten solo) and was credited with half a sack during a 24–22 loss to the Rams. On October 21, 2015, it was reported that Campbell had his position reclassified as defensive tackle after lining up on the interior defensive line for 70.8% of his plays during the first six games. Campbell gave his approval when the Cardinals asked him to primarily play inside and had his position changed to reflect the move to defensive tackle on the team's depth chart. Although Campbell was listed as a defensive tackle he stated his duties would remain the same and he would still line up at defensive end when required. On December 22, 2015, Campbell was selected to the 2016 Pro Bowl. It became his second consecutive Pro Bowl selection and his first as a defensive tackle. On December 27, 2015, he recorded six combined tackles and had a season-high 2.5 sacks on Aaron Rodgers as the Cardinals routed the Packers by a score of 38–8 in Week 16.

Campbell finished the 2015 season with 61 combined tackles (46 solo), five sacks, three passes defensed, and a forced fumble in 16 games and 16 starts. Campbell was lined up in multiple positions and also remained on the field during dime packages. The Cardinals had moderate success in their first season under Bettcher and finished fifth in yards allowed. He was ranked 71st by his fellow players on the NFL Top 100 Players of 2016.

==== 2016 ====
Head coach Bruce Arians named Campbell the starting defensive tackle to begin the season, along with Rodney Gunter. On October 6, 2016, Campbell recorded four combined tackles, two sacks, deflected a pass, made an interception, and a safety during a 33–21 win at the 49ers in Week 5. He intercepted a pass attempt by quarterback Blaine Gabbert in the second quarter, that was intended for tight end Garrett Celek, and registered a safety after sacking Gabbert for a one-yard loss in the end zone during the fourth quarter. In Week 8, Campbell collected a season-high nine combined tackles during a 30–20 loss at the Panthers. In Week 14, Campbell recorded four solo tackles, two sacks, recovered a fumble, and scored his first career touchdown in a 48–41 loss to the Saints. Quarterback Drew Brees had the ball stripped by Markus Golden and it was recovered by Campbell and returned for a 53-yard touchdown in the second quarter. He recorded 53 combined tackles (46 solo), eight sacks, six passes defensed, three fumble recoveries, two forced fumbles, a safety, an interception, one cheap on Ryan Tannehill and a touchdown in 16 games and 16 starts. He was ranked 83rd by his fellow players on the NFL Top 100 Players of 2017.

==== 2017 ====
Campbell became an unrestricted free agent following the 2016 season and received interest from multiple teams, including the Cardinals, Broncos, and Jaguars. The Cardinals offered Campbell a contract that amounted to $9 million per year. His second best offer was from the Denver Broncos, his hometown team, and amounted to an average of $13 million per year.

=== Jacksonville Jaguars ===
==== 2017 ====
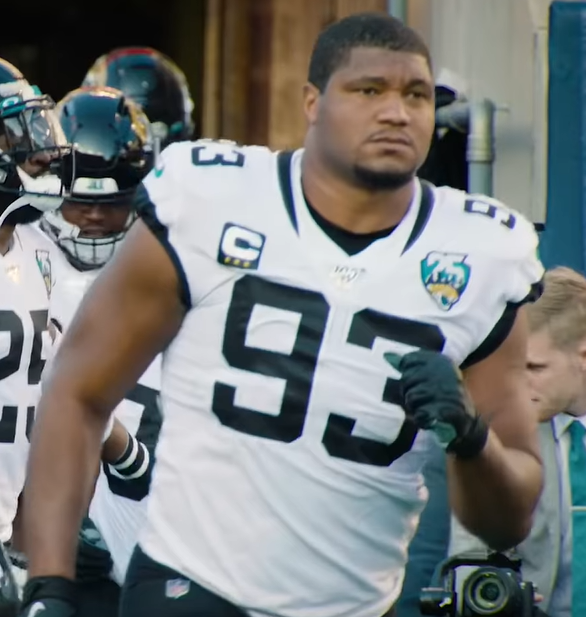
Campbell with the Jacksonville Jaguars in 2019

On March 9, 2017, the Jaguars signed Campbell to a four-year, $60 million contract that includes $30 million guaranteed and a signing bonus of $6 million.

Head coach Doug Marrone chose to move Campbell back to defensive end and named him the starter to begin the regular season, opposite Yannick Ngakoue. Campbell and Ngakoue joined defensive tackles Malik Jackson and Abry Jones.

Campbell started in the Jaguars' season-opener, against the Texans, and recorded six combined tackles and made a career-high four sacks on quarterback Tom Savage in a 29–7 road victory. Campbell's four sacks set a franchise record and the defense also set a franchise record with a combined ten sacks. His performance earned him American Football Conference (AFC) Defensive Player of the Week honors. During the course of the season, the Jaguars' defense earned the moniker "Sacksonville". In Week 13, Campbell brought his sack total to 12.5 sacks, which set a Jaguars franchise record for most sacks in a season. During Week 12, Campbell returned to Arizona to face his former team and recorded three solo tackles and recovered a fumble for a touchdown as the Jaguars were defeated by the Cardinals 27–24 in Week 12. During the fourth quarter, Cardinals' quarterback Blaine Gabbert was stripped by Yannick Ngakoue and Campbell was able to recover the ball and returned it 10 yards for a touchdown. On December 17, 2017, Campbell made five solo tackles, a pass deflection, and two sacks during a 45–7 victory against the Houston Texans. The game marked his fourth multi-sack performance of the 2017 season. The following week, he collected a season-high eight combined tackles and deflected a pass during a 44–33 loss at the 49ers in Week 16. On December 19, 2017, Campbell was voted to the 2018 Pro Bowl, which became his third Pro Bowl selection.

Campbell finished the season with 67 combined tackles (47 solo), a career-high 14.5 sacks, three pass deflections, three forced fumbles, a fumble recovery, and a touchdown in 16 games and 16 starts. He was named The Sporting News Defensive Player of the Year.

The Jaguars finished atop the AFC South with a 10–6 record and earned a playoff berth. On January 7, 2018, Campbell recorded six combined tackles during a 10–3 victory against the Buffalo Bills in the AFC Wild Card Game. The Jaguars went on to defeat the Pittsburgh Steelers 45–42 in the AFC Divisional Round before being eliminated from the playoffs after losing 24–20 at the Patriots during the AFC Championship Game. He was ranked 14th by his fellow players on the NFL Top 100 Players of 2018.

==== 2018 ====
In the 2018 season, Campbell finished with 10.5 sacks, 72 total tackles, 22 quarterback hits, two passes defensed, and one forced fumble. The Jaguars did not retain their overall success from the previous season, this time finishing with a 5–11 record. Despite the Jaguars' disappointing season, Campbell was named to his fourth career Pro Bowl. He was ranked 54th by his fellow players on the NFL Top 100 Players of 2019.

==== 2019 ====
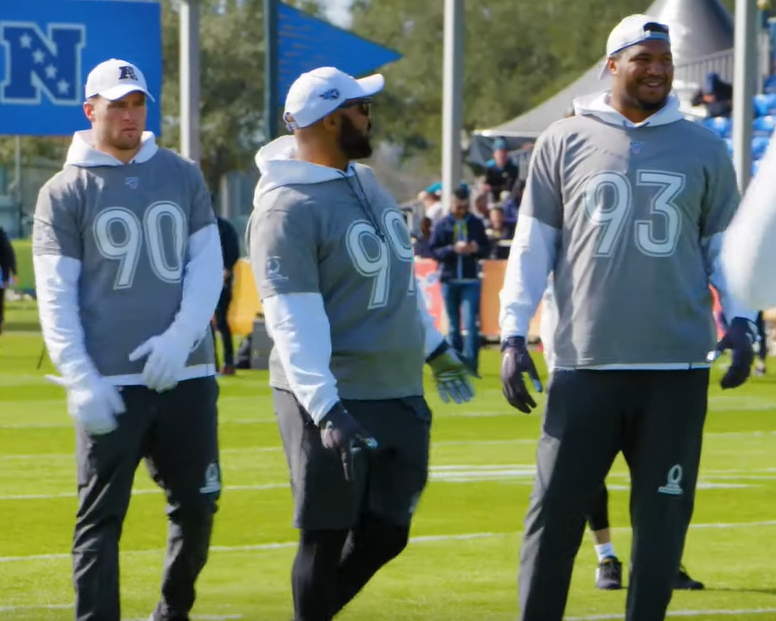
Campbell alongside Jurrell Casey and T. J. Watt at the 2020 Pro Bowl

During Week 3 against the Tennessee Titans, Campbell sacked Marcus Mariota three times as the Jaguars won 20–7, earning him AFC Defensive Player of the Week. In the regular season finale against the Indianapolis Colts, Campbell recovered a fumble lost by Jacoby Brissett and returned it for an 8-yard touchdown during the 38–20 victory. He was named to the Pro Bowl for the 2019 season. He was ranked 79th by his fellow players on the NFL Top 100 Players of 2020. Campbell was named to the Pro Football Hall of Fame All-Decade Team for the 2010s.

=== Baltimore Ravens (first stint) ===
==== 2020 ====
On March 19, 2020, the Jaguars traded Campbell to the Baltimore Ravens for a 2020 fifth-round pick originally acquired from the Falcons. Shortly after the trade, Campbell signed a one-year contract extension.

In Week 2 against the Texans, Campbell recorded his first sack as a Raven on Deshaun Watson during the win. In the Ravens' Week 6 win over the Eagles, Campbell was credited with four tackles for loss, four quarterback hits and sacked Carson Wentz three times. As a result, he was named the AFC Defensive Player of the Week. He was placed on the reserve/COVID-19 list by the Ravens on November 25, 2020, and activated on December 5, 2020. He was named to the Pro Bowl.

==== 2021 ====
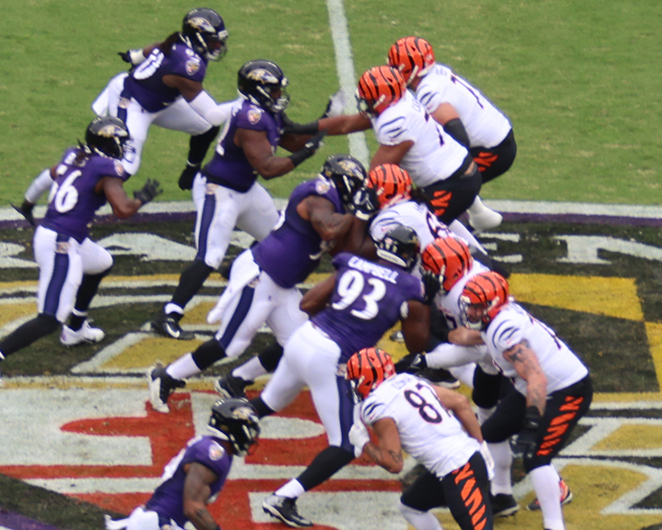
Campbell (#93) playing against the Cincinnati Bengals in 2021

In Week 5 against the Colts, Campbell blocked Rodrigo Blankenship's field goal and recovered late in the fourth quarter, helping the Ravens continue their rally as they were down by eight points at the time. The Ravens would win the game 31–25 in overtime. In the 2021 season, Campbell appeared in and started 15 games. He finished with 49 total tackles, 1.5 sacks, one pass defensed, and 12 quarterback hits

==== 2022 ====
On April 9, Campbell re-signed with the Ravens on a two-year deal worth $12.5 million. In Week 14, Campbell blocked a field goal in a 16–14 win over the Steelers, earning AFC Special Teams Player of the Week. In the 2022 season, Campbell appeared in and started 14 games and finished with 5.5 sacks, 36 total tackles (18 solo), two passes defended, and two forced fumbles.

On March 13, 2023, Campbell was released by the Ravens.

=== Atlanta Falcons ===
On March 29, 2023, Campbell signed a one-year, $7 million contract with the Atlanta Falcons. In Week 6 against the Washington Commanders, Campbell recorded his 100th career sack. In Week 9, Campbell sacked Joshua Dobbs in the end zone to record a safety in the 31–28 loss to the Vikings. In the 2023 season, Campbell finished with 6.5 sacks, 56 total tackles (32 solo), one pass defended, and one forced fumble.

=== Miami Dolphins ===
On June 18, 2024, Campbell signed with the Miami Dolphins. In the 2024 season, Campbell finished with five sacks, 52 total tackles (35 solo), and five passes defended.

=== Arizona Cardinals (second stint) ===
On April 1, 2025, Campbell signed a one-year, $5.5 million contract with the team that originally drafted him, the Arizona Cardinals. In the 2025 season, Campbell finished with 6.5 sacks, 43 total tackles (23 solo), and two passes defended.

=== Baltimore Ravens (second stint) ===
On May 6, 2026, Campbell officially signed a one-year contract worth $5.5 million with $4.75 million guaranteed and a $2 million signing bonus with the Baltimore Ravens.

== Career statistics ==
Legend
	Led the league
**Bold**	Career high

=== NFL ===
==== Regular season ====
Year	Team	Games		Tackles					Interceptions						Fumbles			
Year	Team	GP	GS	Cmb	Solo	Ast	Sck	Sfty	PD	Int	Yds	Avg	Lng	TD	FF	FR	Yds	TD
2008	ARI	16	0	29	24	5	0.0	–	1	–	–	–	–	–	1	–	–	–
2009	ARI	16	15	47	36	11	7.0	–	5	–	–	–	–	–	1	–	–	–
2010	ARI	15	15	60	46	14	6.0	–	2	–	–	–	–	–	–	1	–	–
2011	ARI	16	16	**72**	**53**	19	8.0	–	**10**	**1**	0	0.0	0	–	2	1	–	–
2012	ARI	13	12	63	50	13	6.5	–	6	–	–	–	–	–	–	–	–	–
2013	ARI	16	16	58	45	13	9.0	**1**	6	–	–	–	–	–	1	2	2	–
2014	ARI	14	14	58	48	10	7.0	–	3	**1**	**23**	**23.0**	**23**	–	1	–	–	–
2015	ARI	16	16	61	46	15	5.0	–	3	–	–	–	–	–	–	1	–	–
2016	ARI	16	16	53	34	19	8.0	**1**	6	**1**	1	1.0	1	–	2	**3**	**53**	**1**
2017	JAX	16	16	67	47	20	**14.5**	–	3	–	–	–	–	–	**3**	1	10	**1**
2018	JAX	16	16	**72**	**53**	19	10.5	–	2	–	–	–	–	–	1	1	–	–
2019	JAX	16	16	56	37	19	6.5	–	1	–	–	–	–	–	2	1	8	**1**
2020	BAL	12	12	28	18	10	4.0	–	6	–	–	–	–	–	–	–	–	–
2021	BAL	15	14	49	29	20	1.5	–	1	–	–	–	–	–	–	1	–	–
2022	BAL	14	14	36	18	18	5.5	–	2	–	–	–	–	–	2	–	–	–
2023	ATL	17	17	56	32	**24**	6.5	**1**	1	–	–	–	–	–	1	1	–	–
2024	MIA	17	17	52	35	17	5.0	–	5	–	–	–	–	–	1	–	–	–
2025	ARI	17	17	43	23	20	6.5	–	2	–	–	–	–	–	–	–	–	–
2026	BAL	11	2	17	6	11	1.0	–	1	–	–	–	–	–	–	–	–	–
Career		289	261	977	680	297	118.0	3	66	3	24	8.0	23	0	18	13	73	3

==== Postseason ====
Year	Team	Games		Tackles					Interceptions						Fumbles			
Year	Team	GP	GS	Cmb	Solo	Ast	Sck	Sfty	PD	Int	Yds	Avg	Lng	TD	FF	FR	Yds	TD
2008	ARI	4	0	8	**7**	1	–	–	**1**	–	–	–	–	–	–	–	–	–
2009	ARI	2	1	4	4	0	–	–	0	–	–	–	–	–	–	–	–	–
2014	ARI	1	1	4	0	**4**	–	–	0	–	–	–	–	–	–	–	–	–
2015	ARI	2	2	5	1	**4**	–	–	**1**	–	–	–	–	–	–	–	–	–
2017	JAX	3	3	**11**	**7**	**4**	–	–	0	–	–	–	–	–	–	–	–	–
2020	BAL	2	2	4	1	3	–	–	**1**	–	–	–	–	–	–	–	–	–
2022	BAL	1	1	2	1	1	–	–	0	–	–	–	–	–	–	–	–	–
Total		15	10	38	21	17	0.0	0	3	0	0	0.0	0	0	0	0	0	0

=== College ===
Season	Team	GP	Tackles					Interceptions					Fumbles			
Season	Team	GP	Solo	Ast	Cmb	TfL	Sck	Int	Yds	Avg	TD	PD	FR	Yds	TD	FF
2005	Miami	11	15	9	24	6.0	2.5	0	0	0	0	3	0	0	0	0
2006	Miami	13	**38**	17	**55**	**20.5**	**10.5**	0	0	0	0	**4**	**1**	**1**	0	**3**
2007	Miami	12	30	**20**	50	12.5	6.5	**1**	**1**	**1.0**	0	0	0	0	0	0
Total		36	83	46	129	39	19.5	1	1	1.0	0	7	1	1	0	3

== Career highlights ==
=== Awards and honors ===
NFL

- Walter Payton NFL Man of the Year (2019)
- PFWA NFL Defensive Player of the Year (2017)
- First-team All-Pro (2017)
- 2× Second-team All-Pro (2014, 2016)
- 6× Pro Bowl (2014, 2015, 2017–2020)
- Pro Bowl Defensive MVP (2019)
- NFL 2010s All-Decade Team
- NFLPA Alan Page Community Award (2024)
- Art Rooney Award (2022)
- Bart Starr Award (2019)
- 100 sacks club
- 6× NFL Top 100 — 99th (2015), 71st (2016), 83rd (2017), 14th (2018), 54th (2019), 79th (2020)
- 3× AFC Defensive Player of the Week: (2017, Week 1), (2019, Week 3), (2020, Week 6)
- AFC Special Teams Player of the Week (Week 14, 2022)
- NFC Defensive Player of the Week (Week 2, 2012)
- NFC Special Teams Player of the Week (Week 2, 2009)

College

- First-team All-ACC (2006)

=== Jaguars franchise records ===
- Most sacks in a game (4)

== Personal life ==
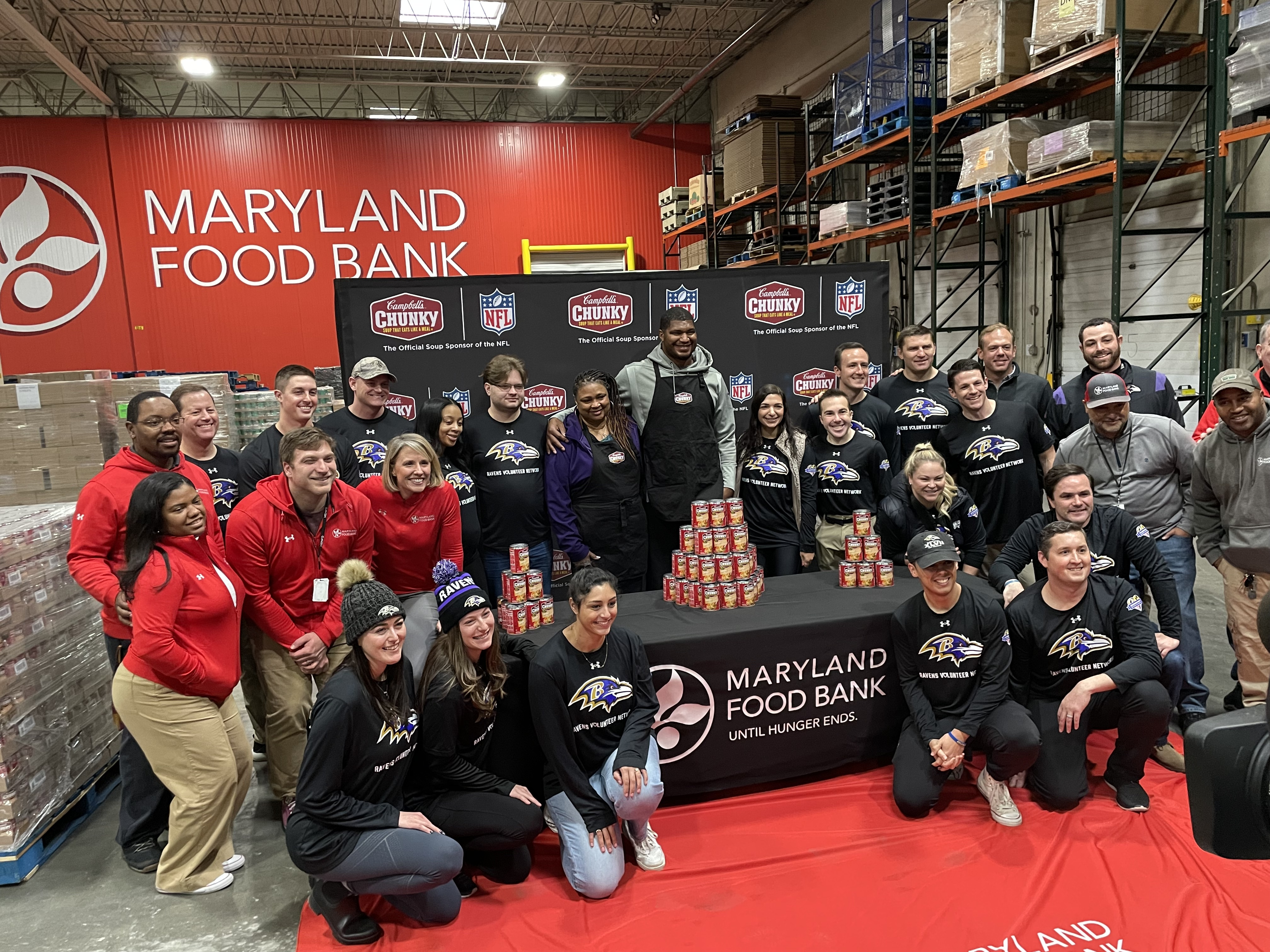
Campbell (center left) poses with his mother, Nateal Campbell, along with Ravens community relations staff and representatives from the Maryland Food Bank as part of the Chunky Sacks Hunger campaign

Campbell was born in Denver, Colorado, to Charles and Nateal Campbell. He was raised with seven siblings. He has two sisters, Kimba Blaylock and Keyonne Campbell, and five brothers: Jamar, Raj, Ciarre, Severin, and Jared. His father, Charles Campbell, died in late 2003. Jared Campbell, a touring stand-up comedian, also played football with Calais at both University of Miami and Arizona Cardinals as a defensive back. His brothers Ciarre and Raj played college football at Colorado State and Butte Junior College, respectively. His brother Severin played at the University of Montana. In December 2007, Campbell graduated from the University of Miami with a degree in sociology. On January 21, 2015, it was announced that Campbell had given $1.6 million to the Hurricanes to establish an endowed scholarship for defensive linemen in perpetuity at the University of Miami. He appeared on the first episode of seventh season of The League, appearing with former teammate Tyrann Mathieu. On June 30, 2026, Campbell's mother, Nateal was reported dead. Police identified the suspect as her son and Calais's brother, Ciarre, who dealt with schizophrenia.

=== Charitable work ===
On November 28, 2022, Campbell partnered with Campbell's Chunky to donate 5,000 Campbell's products to the Maryland Food Bank as part of the "Chunky Sacks Hunger" campaign.

=== 2024 traffic stop ===
On September 8, 2024, hours before the Miami Dolphins were set to begin their season opener against the Jacksonville Jaguars, Tyreek Hill was pulled over by officers outside of the Dolphins stadium while he was on his way to the game. Video, which was filmed by fans, was instantly released to social media where it quickly made national news. The video showed Hill being detained in handcuffs and forced to the ground by three officers who were on top of him holding him down. It was alleged that the situation escalated after Hill refused to obey the orders from the officers. Campbell, Hill's teammate who was also driving to the game, stopped and got involved in an attempt to de-escalate the situation. Campbell got out of his car with his hands up above his head and approached the scene, informing officers that he was a friend of Hill's. He remained at the scene to “support” Hill after he said officers asked him to leave. Police later placed him in handcuffs for “disobeying a direct order" by being too close. “They were trying to yank him down to the ground. I saw them kick him and pull him down ... I feel like one officer was pushing on his head” Campbell said to ESPN. One of the officers was placed on administrative leave pending an investigation. Hill was cited with two traffic citations and was free to leave while Campbell wasn't cited. Both played in that afternoon's game, a 20–17 win over the Jacksonville Jaguars.
