= Drumeo =

Canadian music education company

- Genre: Music
- Founded: 2011
- Founder: Jared Falk; Rick Kettner
- Headquarters: Abbotsford, British Columbia, Canada
- Area served: Worldwide
- Key people: Brandon Toews, content director
- Services: Drum lessons and videos
- Members: 50,000 (2024)
- Parent: Musora Media, Inc.
- Website: drumeo.com

Drumeo is a Canadian international online music education platform co-founded in 2011 by drummer and entrepreneur Jared Falk. Headquartered in Abbotsford, British Columbia, Drumeo has a subscription-based service offering drumming courses, lessons, and video performances from renowned drummers and professional instructors. Drumeo is part of Musora Media Inc., a collective of music education brands.

== History ==
Falk had toured in 2002 with a Christian rock band, but after four months he decided to leave the group and stay in Abbotsford, saying he disliked life on the road. He then decided to upload videos instructing drum students, drawing customers with Google pay-per-click ads. In 2005, one of his students told Falk that a video that had been uploaded to an online drumming forum was "getting thousands of downloads". "We borrowed a handicam, and we filmed it at my family's farm. It smelled like manure in there, and there were flies flying around," he would later recall. He would later sell lesson packs online via digital content, which to many customers' chagrin was available via a link that was only active for 24 hours; many were still using dial-up modems. He also sold DVD packages of these initial lessons.

Sales grew fast in 2005, and by 2006 Drumeo was in a positive situation until Google removed Falk and Kettner's pay-per-click ads, causing a massive reduction in sales. This caused Falk and Kettner to resort to search-engine optimization to increase their visibility, buying as many relevant domain names as they could think of. "Any popular phrase in the drumming world, we most likely own it," Falk remarked. This financial strategy nearly bankrupted the duo, and Falk mentioned in an interview that stores would buy at discount when conducting business operations with him. Their luck turned around in 2008 when they finally studied their audience and fine-tuned their advertising techniques. They had previously thought their main audience was teenagers, but their customers actually turned out to be male adults.

Another issue that Falk needed to address was the issue of location. Abbotsford, described by Falk as "berries and churches" was not known for its musical talent, so there weren't a lot of local prominent musicians. Thus, Falk decided to tie in name talent by using his connections to manufacturers such as the Yamaha Corporation. He sold his pitch to Yamaha and expressed that it could have a positive impact on Yamaha's sales. This drew attention from the drumming community, and Toronto drummer Larnell Lewis of Snarky Puppy recorded a session at Drumeo's studio, followed by others such as Kenny Aronoff.

Falk estimates that he sold about 100,000 packages before deciding he wanted to go back to a digital platform. The Drumeo brand was officially launched in 2011, with Falk describing it as "Netflix for drum lessons." The company originally planned to name the site "Drum IO" ("Drum Instructions Online"), but the domain name was taken; instead, they settled on "Drumeo" ("Drum Education Online").

== Lessons and content ==
Drumeo provides structured lesson plans guiding students through their drumming journey, ensuring steady progress and covering essential fundamentals. The platform offers a wide range of lessons and courses, from basic drumming techniques to advanced concepts and styles. Interactive features include drum play-alongs, live lessons, and community forums for drummers to connect and share their progress. Drumeo's video lessons feature well-known drummers such as Jonathan Moffett, Chad Smith, Tommy Aldridge, Dennis Chambers, Stewart Copeland, Simon Phillips, Mike Portnoy and his son, and the Blue Man Group. Drumeo is particularly known for their For the First Time series, in which they play drumless versions of a song a featured guest has never heard before and ask them to make their own drum part for that song before hearing and reacting to the original drum part, as well as having featured guests learn songs by other musicians on the spot. Some drummers also appear on the channel and walk viewers through their songs.

The channel features a variety of content, including lessons, performances, and interviews with prominent drummers. Each year starting in 2023, Drumeo hosts the Drumeo Awards, where they honor the most notable drummers in music as voted by its members. Notable award winners include Eloy Casagrande, Tré Cool and Alex Van Halen.

== Reception ==
Drumeo has received positive reviews for its comprehensive content and high-quality instruction. MusicRadar praised the platform for its extensive library of lessons and courses from renowned drummers, as well as its high-quality production and broad range of subjects. Drumeo was the runner-up for the Drum Magazine Drummie award for Education Site in 2013 before winning in 2014 and 2015. Jon Hadusek of Consequence called the For the First Time video series "highly entertaining", mentioning in particular a video in which Dream Theater drummer Mike Portnoy challenged host Brandon Toews to play the band's then-unreleased single "Midnight Messiah". Hadusek wrote of the video, that though Toews was skilled, it seemed tough for him to mimick Portnoy's parts precisely. Emily Carter of Kerrang! called the series "awesome." These sessions can be particularly difficult and time-consuming for drummers; Portnoy had, in an earlier session, been asked to play "Pneuma" by Tool, to which he reacted, "This makes Dream Theater sound like fuckin' Weezer. With all due respect to Weezer. I love Weezer. But this is crazy!" Spencer Kaufman, also of Consequence, praised Portnoy's attempt and also wrote that the series was getting to be so popular online that it attracted musical acts from all over the world.

Drumeo's YouTube channel, launched on July 11, 2007, has become a significant resource for drummers worldwide. In 2018, the company had about 10,000 active Drumeo membership subscribers, close to 390,000 Facebook followers and more than 700,000 YouTube subscribers. As of March 2024, Drumeo supported over 50,000 active drum students and had over six million followers on social media, and as of July 2025, the channel boasted over 4.88 million YouTube subscribers and more than 1.1 billion video views shared across over 2,000 videos.. As of November 2026, the channel now has 5.69 million YouTube subscribers. Jenny Lee of the Vancouver Sun wrote that Drumeo's website received around 40,000 visitors per day in 2013. The Globe and Mail writer Jeffrey Jones estimates that Drumeo generates tens of millions of dollars per year, adding that Drumeo employs "the latest digital tech" for students who view their instructional content through subscriptions. According to him, Falk estimates that the secret to his success is "embracing the culture of music". Drummers, he says, tend to understand each other better; while performing, they tend to lay down a rhythmic foundation while vocalists and other musicians tend to take up most of the attention onstage.
