= Jarod, Gujarat =

Jarod
- village
- Location in Gujarat, India Jarod (India)
- Coordinates: 22.433°N 73.333°E
- Country: India
- State: Gujarat
- District: Vadodara
- Talukas: Waghodia

Government
  - Body: Jarod Gram Panchayat
- Elevation: 113 m (371 ft)

Population (2001)
  - Total: 6,438

Languages
  - Official: Gujarati, Hindi
- Time zone: UTC+5:30 (IST)
- PIN: 391510
- Telephone code: 02668
- Vehicle registration: GJ-06
- Lok Sabha constituency: Vadodara
- Vidhan Sabha constituency: Waghodia
- Civic agency: Jarod Gram Panchayat
- Website: gujaratindia.com

Jarod is a village in Vaghodia Taluka of Vadodara district in Gujarat state of India.

== Geography ==
Jarod is at 22.433°N 73.33°E. It has an average elevation of 113 metres (370.64 feet).

== Demographics ==
As of 2001 India census, Jarod had a population of 6,438. Males constitute 3,361 and females are 3,077.
