= Jared Bell Waterbury =

American writer (1799–1876)

- Born: August 11, 1799; New York, New York, U.S.
- Died: December 31, 1876 (age 77); Brooklyn, New York, U.S.
- Occupations: Minister, writer

Jared Bell Waterbury (August 11, 1799 – December 31, 1876) was an American minister and author of several tracts and hymns.

== Early life and education ==
Waterbury was born in New York City on August 11, 1799. He graduated from Yale College in 1822. He spent upwards of two years in the Princeton Theological Seminary, and was ordained to the ministry by the Presbytery of New York, in October 1825. He received the degree of Doctor of Divinity from Union College in 1841.

== Career ==
He passed the winter of 1825–1826 in the South as an agent for the American Bible Society, and the following summer in Massachusetts and on Long Island in a similar way. From January 10, 1827, to February 24, 1829, he was the settled pastor of the Congregational Church in Hatfield, Massachusetts, and on March 18, 1829, took charge of the Pleasant Street Congregational Church in Portsmouth, New Hampshire.

was obliged by his health to resign this charge in 1831, but a year later was able to resume work, and was settled over the Presbyterian Church in Hudson, New York, where he continued with great acceptance until he became, Sept 3, 1846, pastor of the Bowdoin Street Congregational Church in Boston, Massachusetts. In 1857 he retired from parish work, and after two years spent in Stamford, Connecticut, removed to Brooklyn. While his health permitted, he was there engaged in city missions, and was Secretary of the Brooklyn and L. I. Christian Commission during the American Civil War.

Waterbury was the author of more than thirty larger religious works, and of several published tracts, sermons, and hymns.

== Personal life ==
Waterbury was stricken with paralysis about six years before his death, which occurred in Brooklyn, December 31, 1876, at the age of 77. He was married in 1827 to Eliza S. Lewis, eldest daughter of Zechariah Lewis of Brooklyn, who survived him along with four daughters and a son.
