= Francis Sibley =

American musician and academic (1930–2019)

Francis Martin Sibley (February 20, 1930 – June 14, 2019) was an American musician and academic.

== Life and career ==
Sibley was born in Baton Rouge on February 20, 1930. From 1967, he was employed at the University of Puget Sound in Tacoma, Washington. Sibley arranged for the English critic, I. A. Richards, to speak at the university. Sibley and Richards became friends, and Sibley went on to complete his PhD on the topic "I. A. Richards on Speculative Instruments", in 1970 at Louisiana State University. This established Sibley's reputation as a scholar. Sibley died in Columbus, Ohio on June 14, 2019, at the age of 89.

== Writing ==
- Dictionary of Quotations in Geography (1986) with James O. Wheeler
