= Jared Campbell =

American football safety and stand-up comedian (born 1989)

Jared Quay Campbell
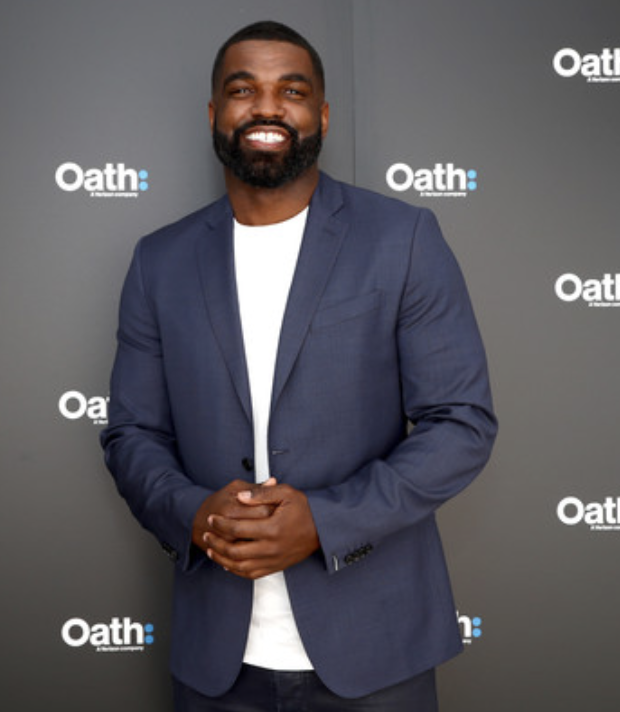
- Campbell in 2018
- Born: Jared Quay Campbell; August 30, 1989 (age 37); Denver, Colorado, U.S.
- Occupations: Comedian; Host; Actor; American football player
- Years active: 2011–2013 (football); 2015–present (comedian)
- Football career

No. 32
- Position: Defensive back

Personal information
- Listed height: 6 ft 0 in (1.83 m)
- Listed weight: 210 lb (95 kg)

Career information
- High school: Aurora (CO) Overland
- College: Miami
- NFL draft: 2011: undrafted

Career history
- Arizona Cardinals (2011)*
- * Offseason or practice squad member only
- Stats at Pro Football Reference
- Website: Official website

Jared Quay Campbell (born August 30, 1989) is an American stand-up comedian, host, actor, and former football safety. He was born in Denver, Colorado. He played college football at the University of Miami and was a member of the Arizona Cardinals.

== Early life ==
Campbell was born in Denver, Colorado, to an African-American father and mother, Campbell played his high school football at Overland High School in Aurora, Colorado. Widely regarded as one of the nation's top defensive back prospects, Campbell chose Miami over Colorado, Washington, and Nebraska. While at the University of Miami, Campbell started doing stand-up comedy, but quit after just three months due to how late night comedy shows didn’t match well with the early morning football practices.

Campbell holds degrees in communication studies and geography from University of Miami.

== Career ==
After retiring from the NFL, Campbell moved to Los Angeles and returned to the comedy stage in 2013. He regularly performs at major comedy clubs around Los Angeles.

Campbell started his own production company along with his older brother Miami Dolphins defensive end Calais Campbell in 2017 and produced an episode of "The Process" for LeBron James Uninterrupted company. He then went on to produce segments for the TV show, That Other Pregame Show on CBS Sports. In 2018, Yahoo Sports hired him to host The Rush with Jared Quay. He also developed, produced, and hosted the show "Family Huddle" alongside his brother Calais, at Yahoo Sports.
