= Jared Falk =

Canadian drummer

Jared Falk (born 1981 in Abbotsford, British Columbia, Canada) is a Canadian professional drummer, teacher and businessman. He is the founder and CEO of Drumeo.

== Biography ==
Falk started playing drums at age 15 and teaching his first student at age 16. He has played with artists such as Riley Armstrong and Cory Alstad.

In 2011, he founded Drumeo, an online drumming tutorial site offering video lessons with a number of instructors. Jared Falk endorses Paiste cymbals and Evans Drumheads.
