= Jared Hauser =

American oboist, recording artist, and educator

Jared Hauser (born 1971) is an American oboist, recording artist, and educator. He is an associate professor of oboe at Vanderbilt University Blair School of Music in Nashville, Tennessee, and also teaches at the National Music Festival in Chestertown, Maryland. Hauser plays with the Blair Woodwind Quintet, the contemporary music group Intersection, and as principal oboe with the Nashville Opera Orchestra. He also performs on period oboes with Early Music City, and Music City Baroque.

Recent features include performing for the RioWinds Festival, the Naxos of America Classical Music Day, the Festival della Piana del Cavaliere Configni, and concerts at the Berlin Phiharmonie, the National Theater of Costa Rica, the Palacio de Congresos de Grandad Spain, the Chateau de la Rouche-Guyon France, as well as venues across North America.

== History ==
Born in Detroit, Michigan, and raised in nearby Southfield, Hauser is from a musical family, and began playing music at a young age, learning to read music before he read words. After experimenting with several instruments, he began playing oboe in the 7th grade, and studied privately with Robert Sorton, and later, Mark Dubois. After attending the Interlochen Arts Camp and the National High-School Music Institute at Northwestern University, Hauser became set on a career in music, and soon enrolled at the Interlochen Arts Academy where he studied with Daniel Stolper.

Hauser earned a Bachelor of Music degree from the University of Michigan School of Music, Theatre & Dance, an Artist's Diploma from the Oberlin Conservatory of Music, his Master of Music degree from the Rice University Shepherd School of Music, and finally a Doctor of Musical Arts from the Michigan State University College of Music, where his instructors were Harry Sargous, James Caldwell, Robert Atherholt, and Daniel Stolper respectively. He also studied with Neil Black, and Alex Klein.

From 2002 to 2009 Hauser was principal oboist of the Orlando Philharmonic Orchestra and faculty at the Lynn Conservatory of Music. Other previous positions include teaching at the Interlochen Center for the Arts (Arts Camp 2005-2017, Arts Academy 2016/17), the Hot Springs Music Festival (2004-2010), and the Crane School of Music SUNY Potsdam (2001/02).

Hauser released his first solo recording, Temporal Fantasies of Britten and Hindemith, with Blue Griffin Recording in 2007. He remains a BGR Artist to this day, and has also recorded for Naxos, AMR, Warner Brothers Music, Koch International, Eroica, and AUR. His performances has been featured on CBC/Radio Canada, BBC Radio 3, and NPR’s Performance Today.

Hauser frequently appears as clinician, both nationally and internationally, on a variety of music-related subjects. In recent seasons he has presented dozens of masterclasses and clinics (both in-person and virtual) to students of all ages on topics such as oboe performance, reed making, chamber music, non-traditional repertoire and performance techniques, period performance practice, pedagogy, career development, and entrepreneurship.

== Contemporary Music ==
Hauser has actively engaged with composers in the creation of new works. Notable commissions and premiers include Stardust (2021), Song Without Words for Oboe and Piano (2020), and Avian Escapades (2016) all by Augusta Read Thomas; Pastorale by Lowell Liebermann; Monk's Oboe for oboe and string quartet (2014) by Libby Larsen, the consortium premier of Crossroads (2014) by John Harbison; Agrestic Landscapes, Birds at Dawn (2021) by Nailah Nombeko; and A Year In The Catskills (2009) by Peter Schickele. Hauser has also premiered works by James Stevenson, Leo Brouwer, Alexis Bacon, Gary Powell Nash, Wu Fei, Daniel Baldwin, John Steinmetz, Robert Patterson, Stan Link, Michael Rose, Michael Slayton, Dabney Morris, Stephen Lamb, David Sartor, David Lipten, Robert Brownlow, Joshua Burel, Elizabeth Hoffman, and Bill Douglas, among others.

== Improvisation ==
Hauser has spent the past several seasons developing skills as a multi-genre improvisor in an attempt to push the boundaries of the oboe’s traditional catalog, and expand his own repertoire beyond the classical realm. Recent performances have included works involving interactive electronic media with improvised oboe, art-music involving improvisation, and performance in genres outside of the classical realm such as jazz, and music of the world. He has studied improvisation with multi-genre saxophonist, Jeff Coffin, and with jazz bassoonist Paul Hanson.

In 2019 Hauser premiered Bogha Baisti, for Improvised Oboe and Soundtrack, by Elizabeth Hoffman, and in 2023 performed electro-acoustic oboe on the premier of Postcards From a Vanishing Point with music by Stan Link.

== Discography ==
=== As soloist ===
- 20th Century Mosaic (2023) BGR 663
- Fresca Barocca (2021) BGR 573
- Past Perfect: Concertos by Pla, Telemann, Albinoni and Bach (2019) BGR 525
- With All String Attached (2018) BGR 445
- Bach (2106) BGR 389
- Into A Cloud (2014) BGR 313
- Operatic Oboe (2010) BGR167
- Temporal Fantasies of Britten and Hindemith (2007) BGR141

=== As Chamber Music ===
- Montrose Duo (2024) BGR 702
- Secret Harbors (2022) BGR 624, with the Mirabelle Trio
- Vanderbilt Virtuosi (2021) BGR 577
- Reinecke, Rose and Damase: Trios for Oboe, Horn and Piano, (2012) BGR 249, with the Mirabelle Trio
- American Classics: Peter Schickele, A Year in the Catskills (2011) Naxos 8.559687, with the Blair Woodwind Quintet
- Heitor Villa-Lobos, Sexteto Mistico and Other Chamber Music (2011) Naxos 9.70127

=== As Ensemble Performer ===
- Three Way, A Trio of One Act Operas (2017) AMR1048, Nashville Opera
- Jazz Nocturne - American Concertos of the Jazz Age (2011) Naxos 8.559647, Hot Springs Music Festival
- Gottschalk (2007) Naxos 8.559320, Hot Springs Music Festival
- Expressions of Music: Expressions of Music Curriculum, Warner Brothers Music
- Gemini and the Phoenix Ensemble (2000) Gemini
- Signs of Intelligent Life (2006) Eroica Classics JDT3301
- America’s Millennium Tribute to Adolphe Sax, Volume VII (2004) Arizona University Recordings AUR CD3128
