= Jared Morgenstern =

American designer and entrepreneur

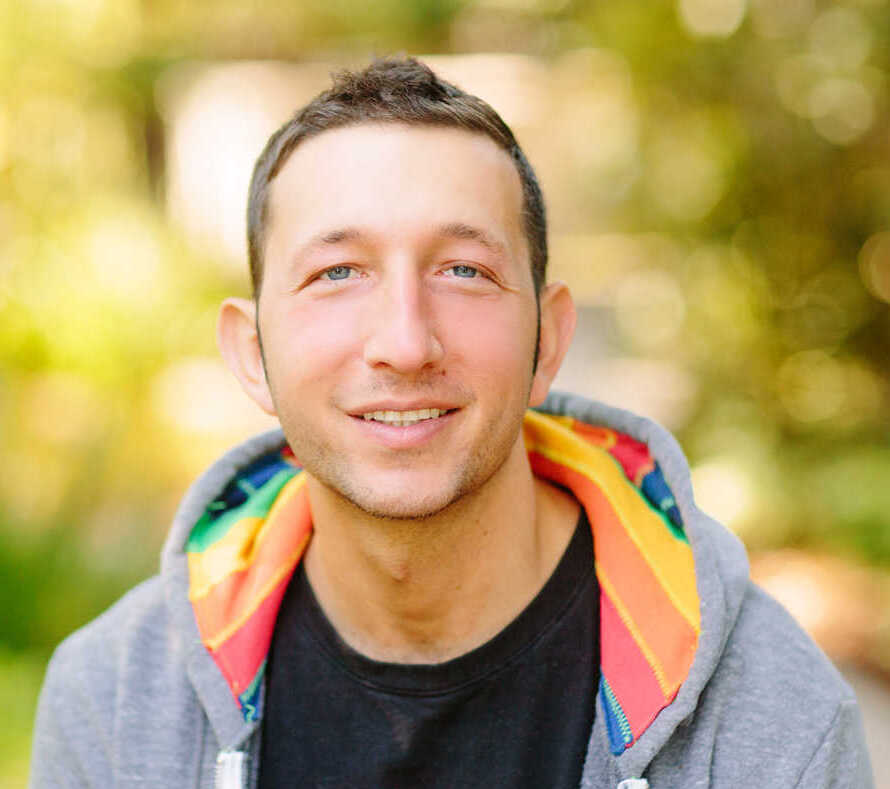
- Morgenstern in 2014
- Born: Jared Seth Morgenstern; March 8, 1981 (age 45); Roslyn Heights, New York, United States
- Education: Harvard University
- Occupations: Designer, CEO
- Employer: String Theory Inc.
- Known for: The third designer hired by Facebook
- Website: www.jaredmorgenstern.com

Jared Seth Morgenstern (born March 8, 1981) is an American designer and entrepreneur. He was the third designer that joined Facebook in its early days and would go on to lead one of facebook's product teams.

== Early life and education ==
Morgenstern was born in New York on the March 8, 1981 and graduated from Harvard University with a Master's and Undergraduate Degree magna cum laude in Computer Science.

== Career ==
Shortly after graduating from Harvard, Morgenstern began working on a social networking website called Metails.com with former classmate, Eddie Lim. Lim and Morgenstern plus a team of two more employees sold Metails.com to Buy.com in 2004.

In January 2006, Morgenstern was recruited to join Facebook as its third designer. At Facebook Jared would eventually lead the product teams working on Virtual Gifts, Usernames, Games, Social Ads, and the Like button among other projects.

In 2014 Jared joined Kleiner Perkins as an entrepreneur partner.
