= Jared Norman =

English cricketer

Personal information
- Full name: Jared Simon Gregory Norman
- Born: 28 November 1974 (age 51); Barnet, London, England
- Batting: Right-handed
- Bowling: Right-arm medium

Domestic team information
- Years: Team
- 1997–2001: Cambridgeshire

Career statistics
Competition	LA
Matches	3
Runs scored	19
Batting average	6.33
100s/50s	–/–
Top score	7
Balls bowled	–
Wickets	–
Bowling average	–
5 wickets in innings	–
10 wickets in match	–
Best bowling	–
Catches/stumpings	–/–
- Source: Cricinfo, 23 July 2010

Jared Simon Gregory Norman (born 28 November 1974) is a former English cricketer. Norman was a right-handed batsman who bowled right-arm medium pace. He was born at Barnet, London.

Norman made his debut for Cambridgeshire in the 1997 Minor Counties Championship against Norfolk. From 1997 to 2001, he represented the county in 22 Minor Counties Championship matches, with his final appearance in that competition coming against Norfolk. He also represented the county in 11 MCCA Knockout Trophy matches from 1998 to 2002, with his final appearance for the county coming against the Essex Cricket Board.

Norman also represented Cambridgeshire in List-A cricket, where he made his debut in that format of the game against Kent in the 1998 NatWest Trophy. He played 2 further List-A matches for the county against the Netherlands in the 1999 NatWest Trophy and Hertfordshire in the 2000 NatWest Trophy. In his 3 List-A matches, he scored just 19 runs at a batting average of 6.33, with a high score of 7.

Norman continues to play club cricket for Potters Bar Cricket Club in the Home Counties Premier Cricket League.
