= Jared Lehr =

American jewelry fashion designer

Jared Lehr is an American jewelry fashion designer based in Los Angeles. He served as Creative Director of Sam Lehr before launching his own line of fine jewelry in 2016.

== Career ==
In 2016 he launched his fine jewelry business and sells exclusively at Saks Fifth Avenue/ Bergdorf Goodman/ and Neiman Marcus.

He was part of the host committee for The Art of Elysium Heaven 2018 art installation curated by singer John Legend. Among the celebrities who have dressed in Lehr's designs are Zoe Saldaña, Allison Janney, Carrie Underwood, Taylor Swift, Miley Cyrus, Katy Perry and Tiffany Haddish.

His designs have been featured in Vogue Arabia, The Hollywood Reporter, Robb Report, W Magazine, InStyle Magazine, Harper's Bazaar Arabia, and L’Officiel Paris.
