= Nissim Nassim Adis =

Singaporean businessman

Nissim Nassim Adis (17 May 1857 — 5 September 1927), also known as Nissim Nissim Adis, was a prominent Jewish businessman and stockbroker in Singapore.

== Early life and education ==
Adis was born on 17 May 1857 in Howrah. He attended the St. Thomas' Church School.

== Career ==
In 1894, Adis began his legal apprenticeship with attorneys-at-law Messrs. Templeton & Carapiet in Kolkata, before leaving to establish an exchange and stockbroking business two years later. His business was initially successful, but eventually failed after a financial crisis in Kolkata. He then left for Hong Kong in 1888 to establish a separate exchange and stockbroking business which was also initially successful. However, the business soon failed and he left for Singapore in June 1893, where he found great success in both trading stocks and selling real estate.

Adis signed an agreement with the contractor rebuilding the Grand Hotel de l’Europe in November 1905, and became responsible for the construction costs of the redevelopment. The redevelopment was completed on 7 August 1907, after which he became the hotel's proprietor.

== Personal life and death ==
Adis married Leah Judah, the daughter of merchant A. N. E. Judah and the granddaughter of banker Emanuel Raphael Belilios, on 22 December 1895. Together, they had one daughter, Gracia Adis.

Adis was a Freemason, and was made the Master of the Lodge of the St Andrew’s in the Far East lodge, becoming the first Jew to be the lodge's Master of the Lodge. He built the Adis Lodge mansion on Mount Sophia in 1907, with the private road leading up to the mansion being named Adis Road. The mansion became known as "one of the most magnificent mansions east of the Suez". In 1912, the mansion was sold to Eu Tong Sen. He was also a car enthusiast.

He died in Mussoorie, India on 5 September 1927.
