= Jared Curtis (footballer) =

Samoan footballer (born 1979)

Personal information
- Date of birth: 29 April 1979 (age 47)
- Place of birth: Apia, Samoa
- Height: 1.76 m (5 ft 9 in)
- Position: Midfielder

Senior career*
Years	Team	Apps	(Gls)
–2011	Wellington Olympic AFC		
2011–2012	Manawatu United	3	(0)

International career
2011	Samoa	3	(0)
- * Club domestic league appearances and goals

Jared Curtis (born 29 April 1979 in Apia, Samoa) is a Samoan former footballer. He was a Samoa international.

== Manawatu United ==
Ascertained to trial for Manawatu United after representing his national team, Curtis was only part of the club for short time, making three appearances.
