= Jarod Schilke =

German politician (born 2000)

Member of the Landtag of Mecklenburg-Vorpommern
- Incumbent
- Assumed office 20 October 2026

Personal details
- Born: 2000 (age 25–26)
- Party: Alternative for Germany (since 2019)

Jarod Schilke (born 2000) is a German politician who was elected member of the Landtag of Mecklenburg-Vorpommern in 2026. He has been a city councillor of Stralsund and a district councillor of Vorpommern-Rügen since 2024.
