= Jared Bowen =

American journalist

Jared Bowen is an American reporter and TV personality in the Boston area.

== Career ==
Jared Bowen joined the staff of Greater Boston in 1998 as a researcher and moved up through the ranks to associate producer and then field producer. Bowen began appearing as an occasional contributor on Greater Boston in 2002 and was named a permanent on-air reporter in 2005. As such, he covers everything from breaking news to politics to arts and culture in his “Center Stage” reports. In his tenure with Greater Boston, Bowen has produced four news documentaries for the program, including "Veil of Secrecy", an examination of the Catholic Church's sexual abuse scandal, a special on the James “Whitey” Bulger saga, a half-hour program on the aftermath of September 11, and The Opinion Makers, a behind-the-scenes look at the Supreme Judicial Court. He was also Greater Boston's primary producer for the "Eye on Education" series, for the first three seasons.

Bowen is a member of the Elliot Norton Awards Selection Committee recognizing achievement in Boston theater. He is also on the Board of Governors for the Boston/New England Chapter of the National Academy of Television Arts and Sciences.

== Awards ==
Bowen is the recipient of two New England Emmy Awards. Prior to joining the show, he was awarded a fellowship with the International Radio & Television Society, which placed him at Dateline NBC in New York City.

== Education ==
Bowen graduated from Emerson College with a degree in Broadcast Journalism, where he also won several Associated Press awards for his reporting.
