= Jared Mitchell (writer) =

Canadian journalist and fiction author (born 1955)

Jared James Mitchell (born 1955) is a Canadian journalist and fiction author, currently based in Toronto, Ontario. Besides his books, he has written for numerous newspapers and magazines such as Maclean's and The Globe and Mail. He also established the fotonovella.com website for his media fiction works which are termed "photonovellas".

== Bibliography ==
- The Invincible. Toronto: Lester, 1995. ISBN 1-895555-71-X
- Becky Chan. Toronto: Dundurn, 2001. ISBN 0-88924-300-X
- The Bad Guys. Kindle, 2011. ASIN B005FCYB0I
- Mayhem. Wattpad, 2015. ASIN B019ZPEW9U
