= Jared Nissim =

American technology businessman

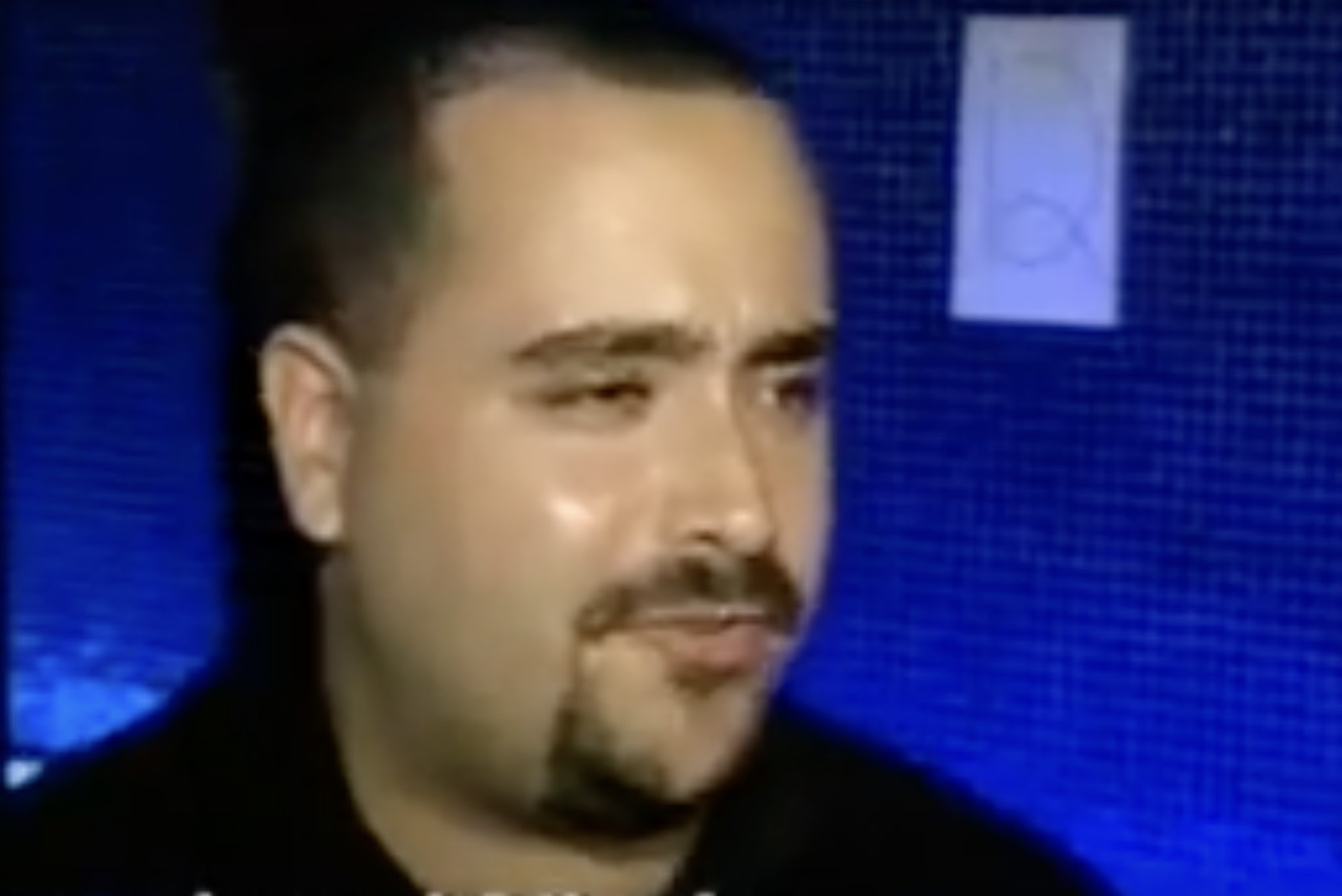
- Education: Stony Brook University; University of Maryland, College Park
- Occupations: Entrepreneur; Startup Founder; Community organizer; Social Media entrepreneur
- Years active: 2001–present
- Known for: The Lunch Club; Meet The Neighbors; Speed Friending; Secret City Scavenger Hunts.

Jared Nissim is an American entrepreneur and community organizer best known for early social networking and community-engagement projects in New York City, including The Lunch Club, Meet The Neighbors, Speed Friending, and Secret City Scavenger Hunts.

== Early life and education ==
Nissim attended Stony Brook University from 1991 to 1993 and later earned a Bachelor of Arts degree from the University of Maryland, College Park, in 1995.

== Career ==
=== The Lunch Club ===
In late 2001, Nissim began organizing informal lunch gatherings in Manhattan by posting invitations on Craigslist. These meetups evolved into The Lunch Club, a grassroots network designed to help New Yorkers form friendships outside of dating contexts. A New York Times report described Nissim (then age 30) as a Lower Manhattan resident who started the group to alleviate the isolation of working from home, calling it an early example of “offline social networking”. The Wall Street Journal and The Boston Globe also noted how the initiative encouraged daytime socializing and later expanded to other cities such as Boston. By 2006, The Guardian reported The Lunch Club had grown to over 8,000 members in New York and was preparing to launch in London. The story of The Lunch Club was syndicated internationally for example, The Times of India echoed The New York Times' coverage of Nissim’s efforts to help urban residents make friends beyond romance.

=== Meet The Neighbors ===
Building on his interest in localized connection, Nissim launched Meet The Neighbors in 2004. It was a website enabling residents of the same apartment building or neighborhood to connect online and coordinate in-person events. A New York Times real estate feature described the platform as essentially letting “the internet knock on the door,” helping apartment dwellers exchange information and organize building gatherings.

=== Speed Friending ===
In 2005, Nissim adapted the speed-dating concept into a purely platonic social event called Speed Friending, where participants rotated through brief five-minute conversations to make new friends.

=== The Giving Effect ===
In 2010, Nissim co-founded The Giving Effect, a social-media-driven platform connecting donors with charities seeking in-kind contributions. He discussed the project on NPR’s The Diane Rehm Show, explaining how it used online tools to match people with organizations in need. Computerworld cited The Giving Effect as an example of emerging “social philanthropy” that integrates digital networks with charitable giving.

=== Secret City Scavenger Hunts ===
Around 2008, Nissim founded Secret City Scavenger Hunts, a company producing team-building scavenger hunts and interactive game events around New York City. These events serve corporate, school, and private groups. Secret City’s hunts have been featured on national television, including a segment on NBC’s Saturday TODAY show that in 2025 showcased one of its scavenger hunts at Rockefeller Center.

== Music ==
In addition to his entrepreneurial projects, Nissim has pursued interests in music. A drummer by hobby, he recorded songs with Fountains of Wayne guitarist Jody Porter for Porter’s debut solo album Close to the Sun (2010). Nissim has also performed with local New York City bands, although these musical activities have not been widely covered in mainstream media.

== Media ==
Nissim’s community initiatives have been featured in outlets such as The New York Times, The Guardian, Time, Newsweek, BBC News, Computerworld, Curbed NY, Adweek, The Times of India, and NPR. Collectively, these independent sources have noted his role as an innovator in organizing offline social interaction during the early rise of internet culture. Commentators have cited his work particularly Speed Friending and The Lunch Club – in discussions of urban isolation, online community-building, and the evolution of social networking beyond purely digital platforms.
