= Jared Curtis (professor) =

Professor Emeritus of English

Jared Ralph Curtis (born 1936) is Professor Emeritus of English at Simon Fraser University.

== Biography ==
Curtis received his BA from Yale University in 1957, his MA from the University of Michigan in 1961, and his PhD from Cornell University in 1966. After working at Susquehanna University, Indiana University, and the University of Arizona, he joined Simon Fraser University as an associate professor in 1971. From 1979 to 1995 he was professor of English at Simon Fraser.

He is internationally known for his work in editing the work and manuscript materials of William Wordsworth and W. B. Yeats: he has supervised the Cornell University Press editions of Wordsworth and Yeats. He is the 2013 recipient of the M. L. Rosenthal Award for distinguished contributions to Yeats studies.

== Retirement ==
After moving to a senior living community in Seattle, he helped found and served first as Designer and then as Publisher and Editor-in-Chief of the community newsletter, The Mirabella Monthly. In each of the years 2017-2023, the newsletter received an APEX Award "For Excellence in Publishing" from Communications Concepts: Best Practices in Print, Web & ePublishing. Curtis independently published a book of walks in Seattle in 2014. His poems have appeared in the medical journal Pharos, a publication of the Alpha Omega Honor Medical Society.

== Works ==
- Wordsworth's experiments with tradition; the lyric poems of 1802, with texts of the poems based on early manuscripts, Cornell University Press, 1971. ISBN 978-0-8014-0662-1
- (ed.) Poems in two volumes, and other poems, 1800–1807, by William Wordsworth, Cornell University Press, 1983. ISBN 0-8014-1445-8
- (ed.) The Fenwick Notes of William Wordsworth, Bristol Classical Press, 1993; rev. ed., Humanities Ebooks, 2007. ISBN 978-1-84760-004-2
- (co-ed.) Early Poems and Fragments, 1785–1797, by William Wordsworth, Cornell University Press, 1997. ISBN 0-8014-3318-5
- (ed.) Last Poems, 1821–1850, by William Wordsworth, Cornell University Press, 1999. ISBN 0-8014-3625-7
- (ed.) The Land of Heart's Desire: manuscript materials, by W. B. Yeats, Cornell University Press, 2002. ISBN 0-8014-4048-3
- (ed.) "Sophocles’ Oedipus at Colonus: manuscript materials, by W. B. Yeats, Cornell University Press, 2008. ISBN 978-0-8014-4703-7
- "The Cornell Wordsworth: a supplement", Humanities–Ebooks, 2008. ISBN 978-1-84760-092-9
- (co-ed.) "The Resurrection: manuscript materials", by W. B. Yeats, Cornell University Press, 2011. ISBN 978-0-8014-5013-6
- (co-ed.) On Baile's Strand: manuscript materials, by W. B. Yeats, Cornell University Press, ISBN 978-0-8014-5261-1
- Out from the Center: Seattle Neighborhood Walks, Lulu, 2014 ISBN 978-1-3120-4440-1
- “Writing Inside the Envelope,” Simon Says, Summer 2020 Vol XVII No. 2, p. 18
- “Aging Well,” Simon Says, Summer 2021 Vol. XVIII No. 2
- “Work Order,” Simon Says, Spring 2022 Vol. XIX No. 1
- “Make Room for Love,” Simon Says, Summer 2022 Vol. XIX No. 2
- “Haiku Challenge: A Morning at the Ophthalmology Clinic,” Simon Says, Fall 2022 Vol. XIX No. 3
- “Time Is,” Simon Says, Fall 2022 Vol. XIX No. 3
- “Giving Mode,” Simon Says, Spring 2023, p. 7
- “Flight Paths,” Simon Says, Summer 2023, p. 5
- “Dynamic Perturbations,” Simon Says, Summer 2023, p. 6
- “Colloquies of crows,” Simon Says, Fall 2023, p. 19
- “A Tea Tale,” Simon Says, Spring 2024, p. 13
